= St. Mary of the Angels (Chicago) =

Coordinates: 41.9157°N 87.67125°W

St. Mary of the Angels Church
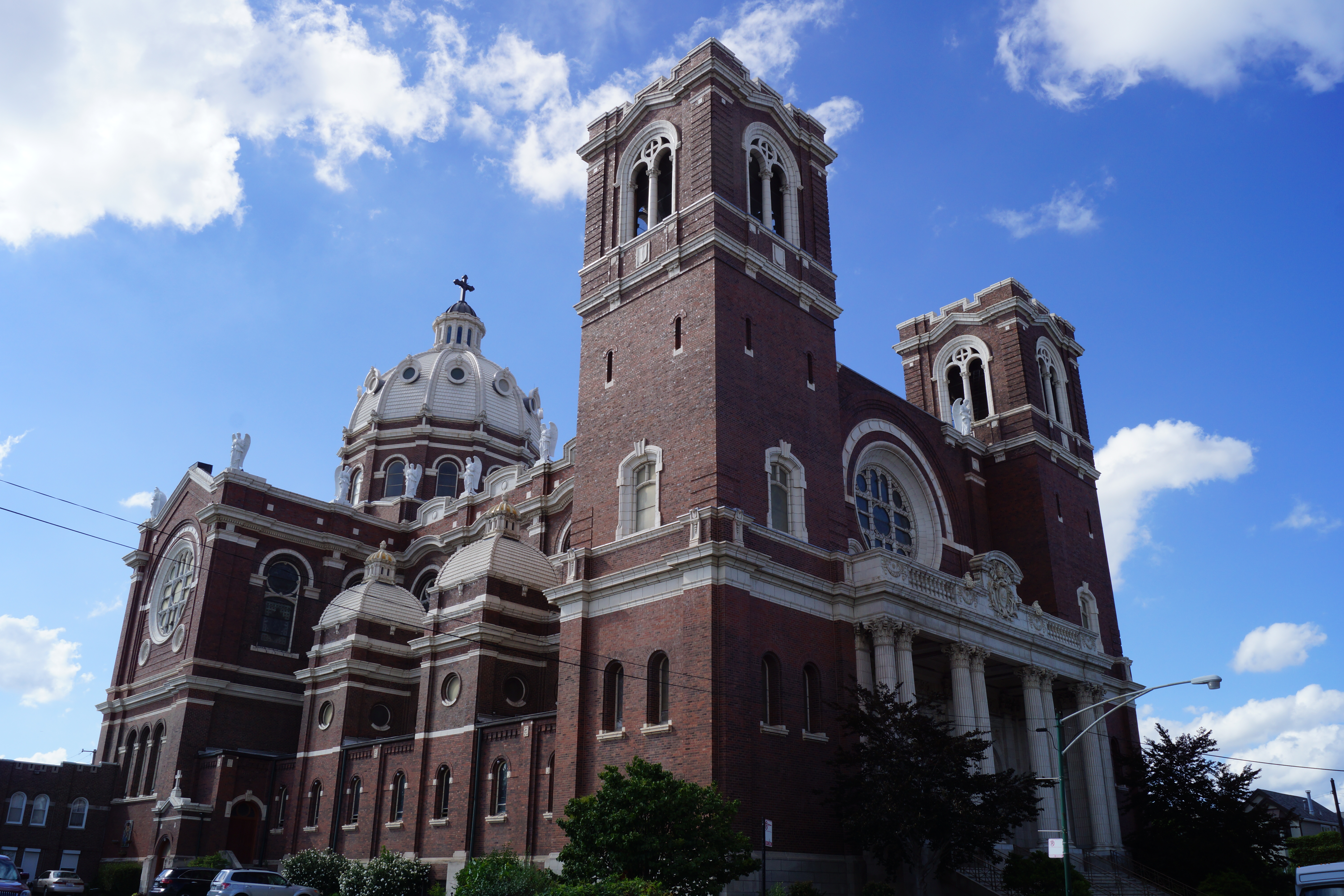
- St. Mary of the Angels from the southeast

- Location within the United States
- Location: 1850 N. Hermitage Ave. Chicago, Illinois
- Country: United States
- Denomination: Roman Catholic
- Website: St. Mary of the Angels Parish

History
- Founded: 1899
- Founder: Polish immigrants
- Dedication: St. Mary of the Angels
- Dedicated: May 30, 1920
- Consecrated: December 10, 1899

Architecture
- Functional status: Active
- Heritage designation: For Polish immigrants
- Architect: Worthmann and Steinbach
- Architectural type: Church
- Style: Roman Renaissance
- Groundbreaking: August 2, 1914
- Completed: 1920
- Construction cost: $400,000 (1920)

Specifications
- Capacity: 2,000
- Length: 230 ft.
- Width: 125 ft.
- Materials: Brick, Terracotta

Saint Mary of the Angels (Polish: Kościół Matki Boskiej Anielskiej) is a historic church of Roman Catholic Archdiocese of Chicago in Chicago, Illinois.

Located at 1850 North Hermitage Avenue in Chicago's Bucktown neighborhood, it is an example of the Polish Cathedral style of churches. Along with St. John Cantius Church (Chicago), St. Stanislaus Kostka, St. Hyacinth Basilica, St. Hedwig, St. Wenceslaus, and Holy Trinity it is one of the monumental Polish churches visible from the Kennedy Expressway.

From 1899 until 1990, the parish was administered by priests of the Congregation of the Resurrection. Since January 1991, it has been administered by the Priestly Society of the Holy Cross.

== Architecture ==
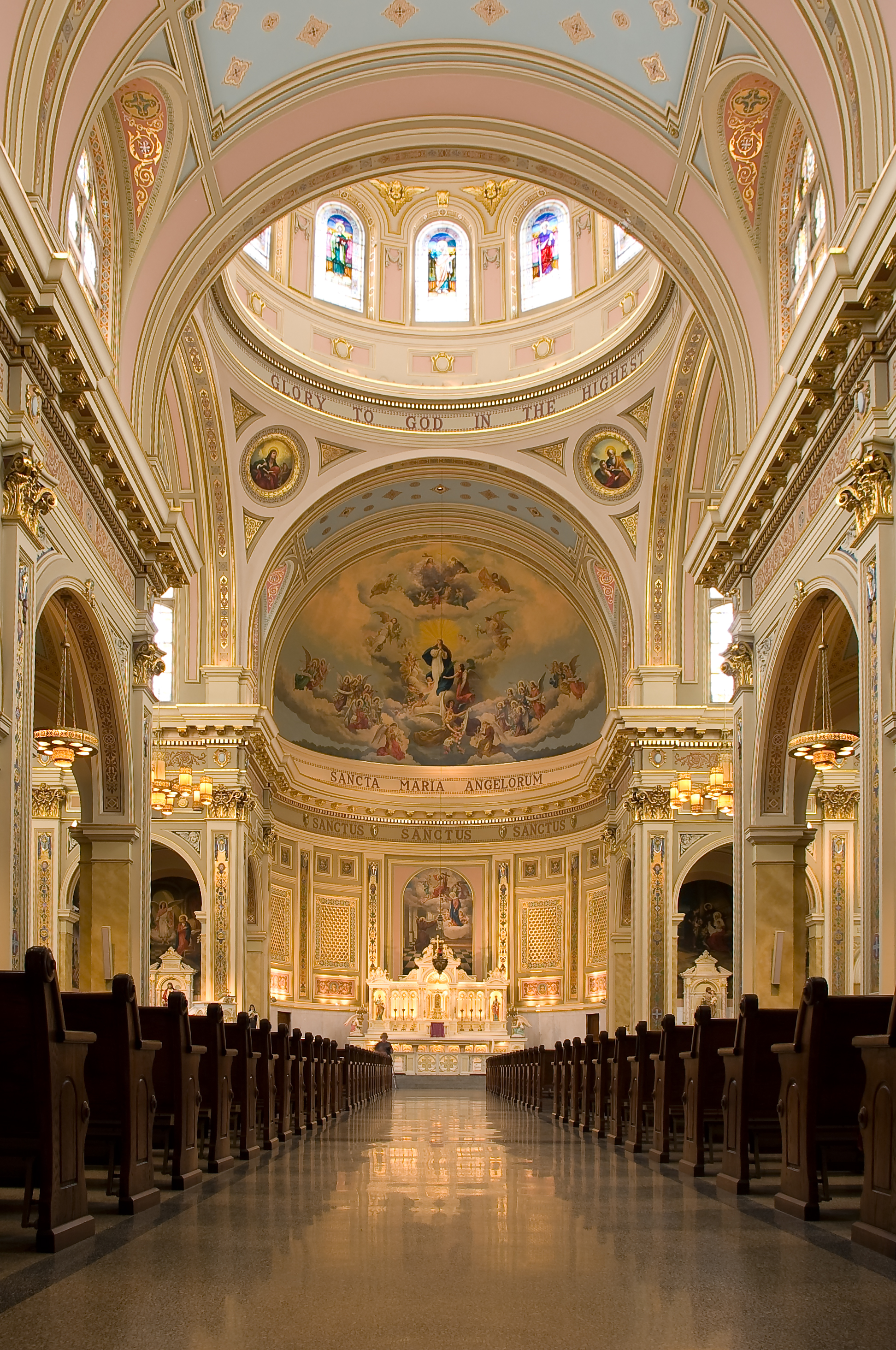
Nave

Like a number of other Polish churches in the so-called Polish Cathedral style such as St. Josaphat's Basilica in Milwaukee or Immaculate Heart of Mary in Pittsburgh, the architectural firm of Worthmann and Steinbach modeled the church's design on St. Peter's Basilica in Rome. It has been acclaimed as one of the finest specimens of Roman Renaissance architecture in the United States. The imposing brick edifice with its twin bell towers and magnificent dome was constructed at a cost of $400,000—a testament to the zeal of Father Gordon and to the generosity of parishioners.

In 1948, in preparation for the parish's Golden Jubilee, John A. Mallin decorated the interior of the church with ornate designs and paintings. The W. W. Kimball pipe organ was installed in 1923 at a cost of $23,750. It contains four manuals and 57 ranks that include theater stops which make it a rarity in the Archdiocese of Chicago. The cost of overhauling the organ in 1962 amounted to $15,000.

In 1973, extensive repairs were made on the exterior of the dome of St. Mary of the Angels Church and the Holy Name Society donated the blue "Guiding Light", which was visible in the cupola for a significant distance—especially from the nearby Kennedy Expressway.

== History ==
=== Beginnings and the building of the parish plant ===
St. Mary of the Angels parish was organized in 1899 by Rev. Vincent Barzynski, CR, pastor of St. Stanislaus Kostka, Chicago's oldest Polish parish.

The parish was founded to serve the large number of Poles who had settled in Bucktown, which was a part of Chicago's Polish Downtown. The archdiocese purchased two city blocks totaling 96 lots at the corner of Hermitage and Cortland (formerly Clybourn Place) for $60,000. One block was subdivided for residences while the other became the site of the parish. The first pastor, Rev. Francis Gordon CR, laid the cornerstone of the first building at 1810 North Hermitage Avenue, now used as the school, on July 2, 1899. The three-story brick building was designed in the Renaissance style by Henry J. Schlacks and completed at the cost of $65,000. The basement housed meeting rooms, a gymnasium, and an auditorium. The main floor contained twelve classrooms and convent quarters, while the second floor held the sanctuary with living quarters for the priests in the attic. The archbishop led the dedication ceremony, and Mayor Carter Harrison IV was among the crowd of 20,000 witnesses.

Rev. Francis Gordon C.R. (1860-1931) - Founder of St. Mary of the Angels Parish

On February 15, 1900, four Sisters of the Congregation of the Resurrection opened St. Mary of the Angels School with an enrollment of 425 students. In 1905, the new building at 1849 North Hermitage became the home of the novitiate for the sisters order. In 1909, Fr. Gordon began planning a new church building at the corner of Hermitage and Cortland. Although work commenced on September 28, 1911, the cornerstone of the church was not laid until August 2, 1914. Due to the numerous delays caused by strikes, World War I, and the critical shortage of building materials, construction continued over a period of eight years and eight months. In the meantime, the present rectory at 1825 North Wood Street was completed in July 1912. Finally, Archbishop George Mundelein dedicated the new St. Mary of the Angels sanctuary May 30, 1920.

In 1899, only one parish committee and three societies existed, by the 1920s, the parish had grown to encompass a parish committee, two building and loan associations, 28 confraternities, sodalities, fraternal societies, and clubs.

According to the September 21, 1912 edition of The New World, the parish had "grown so rapidly that it is now one of the largest parishes in the Archdiocese" with a membership of approximately 1,200 families. In nearby Annunciation parish membership continued to decline as Irish families moved away from the neighborhood. Once a flourishing Irish parish, by 1916 Annunciation parish numbered only 150 families.

In 1915, the novitiate of the Sisters of the Resurrection was transferred to Norwood Park and plans were made to open a Day Nursery for children in the building at 1849 North Hermitage Avenue. Beginning February 21, 1917, children of working mothers were cared for by the Sisters of the Resurrection. By 1925, the school had an enrollment of 1,099 students who were under the direction of 22 Sisters of the Resurrection.

From 1918 to 1924, Father Gordon served as regional superior of the Resurrectionists in the United States. In recognition of his many accomplishments on behalf of Polish Catholics in Chicago, he was awarded a papal medal in 1924.

Father Gordon continued to serve the people of St. Mary of the Angels until his death on February 13, 1931. When the Archdiocese of Chicago organized a branch of Archbishop Weber High School in September 1952 in quarters at Division Street and Haddon Avenue it named the new facility Gordon Technical High School in honor of the first pastor of the parish. (In the summer of 2014, the school was renamed DePaul College Prep and its campus was named the Father Gordon Campus.)

Rev. Leonard Long, CR served as pastor March to October 1931 and was succeeded by Rev. Thaddeus Ligman, CR, who remained as pastor for one year. In 1932, Rev. Edward Brzezinski, CR began a long pastorate of 19-years at St. Mary of the Angels. Not only had he grown up in the parish, but he had served as an assistant for three years. Under Father Brzezinski's leadership, the $250,000 parish debt was liquidated.

Over the years, additions, alterations, and improvements have been made to the parish campus. In the 1930s, the auditorium became known as the Polish Aragon, a reference to the popular Aragon Ballroom that still exists in the city's Uptown neighborhood. The auditorium became a popular meeting place for the young people of the neighborhood and they turned out by the hundreds to attend the weekly dances sponsored by the parish.

Rev. John Grabowski, CR, succeeded Father Brzezinski as pastor in 1951. He directed the construction of the present convent building at 1800 North Hermitage Avenue. Completed at a cost of $450,000, Cardinal Samuel Stritch dedicated it August 16, 1953.

In 1954, Rev. Chester Brzegowy, CR, became pastor and was succeeded in 1957 by Rev. Anthony Rybarczyk, CR.

=== Decline and renewal ===
At its founding, St. Mary of the Angels parish numbered about 300 families. During the peak years of the 1920s, more than 1,600 families belonged to the parish with nearly 1,200 children enrolled in the parish school. Construction of the Kennedy Expressway significantly impacted the parish. Many homes in the neighborhood were razed to make way for the highway, which cut through the heart of Chicago Polonia. When the segment of the expressway which extends from Lake Street to Foster Avenue opened to traffic November 5, 1960, the parish had lost a sizable number of families and school enrollment had declined by one-third.

Rev. Joseph Polinski, CR, served as pastor from 1964 until 1967, followed by Rev. Stanley Majkut, CR. Rev. Edward Karlowicz, CR, became pastor March 13, 1974. He grew up in nearby St. Stanislaus Kostka parish, was ordained in 1948 and from 1954 to 1960, served as principal of Weber High School.

The church was renovated in preparation for the diamond jubilee of the founding of St. Mary of the Angels parish. Auxiliary Bishop Alfred Leo Abramowicz presided at the special jubilee Mass October 13, 1974. The year of festivities concluded with a parish dinner on December 8, 1974 at the House of the White Eagle. Since formation of the parish, 20 young men have been ordained, nine of them as Resurrectionists. Of the 36 young women from the parish who entered religious orders, 27 joined the Sisters of the Congregation of the Resurrection.

In 1975, a Parish Council was organized. With the approval and cooperation of Father Karlowicz, a Concerned Citizens Group-composed mainly of parishioners sponsored meetings and talks for the benefit and welfare of all in the neighborhood.

In 1978, the Archdiocese announced that the territorial parish of Annunciation would be consolidated. Spanish speaking families who had belonged to the parish were invited to join St. Mary of the Angels Church, St. Stanislaus Kostka Church, St. Hedwig Church, or St. Aloysius Church-all of which had Spanish speaking parishioners. Following the last Mass in Annunciation Church on June 25, 1978, the parish records were transferred to St. Mary of the Angels and later to the Archdiocese of Chicago Offices.

Father Karlowicz was transferred out of St. Mary's in the spring of 1984. He served as associate pastor at St Hyacinth's & St. John Cantius before dying on September 5, 2002 at the age of 80.

The church was closed and slated for demolition in 1988 due to unsafe conditions. Citizens and historians rallied to save the historic structure but feared the cause was already lost.

Three years later in 1991, Cardinal Joseph Bernardin, then Archbishop of Chicago, entrusted the administration of the parish and school to the priests of Opus Dei. The Rev. John Twist, the first Pastor under this new administration, and his successor the Rev. Hilary Mahaney helped the parish grow once again. They launched several restoration campaigns leading to various private donations which helped bring the church structure to life once again with major repairs of the dome, the roofs and the stained-glass windows. Repairs continued in 1997 with the church interior. By the 100th anniversary of the parish in 1999, the church's interior decoration had been fully restored, new lighting, doors and a new sound system were installed. The 26 roof angels, fully rebuilt, were restored and continue to gleam cheerfully from Saint Mary's roof tops. In 2002, the parish constructed a chapel dedicated to St. Josemaría Escrivá de Balaguer, the Founder of Opus Dei, in the newly remodeled lower level.

In April 2014, Francis Cardinal George appointed Rev. John R. Waiss as Pastor effective May 1, 2014 with the retirement of Rev. Hilary Mahaney. Mahaney remains as Pastor Emeritus.

== St. Mary of the Angels today ==
Located in the heart of Bucktown and open from dawn to dusk, seven days a week, Sunday Masses are celebrated in English, Polish and Spanish. Every week, hundreds of area residents come to worship, attend classes and events. The priests of Opus Dei continue to oversee the parish.

The area around the church is often referred to as 'Marianowo' by Poles. In recent years, the ethnic character of St. Mary of the Angels parish has undergone a gradual change from an exclusively Polish parish to one that is multicultural and multiracial, as the neighborhood first witnessed an influx of Hispanic immigrants in the early 1970s and then urban professionals in the 1990s as the area began to gentrify.

=== Mass Schedule ===
Sundays - English: 8:00 a.m.; 10:00 a.m.; 7:15 p.m. Spanish: 12:00 p.m.

Saturdays - English: 8:00 a.m.*; 5:00 p.m. (Mass of Anticipation); Polish: 6:30 p.m. (Mass of Anticipation)

Weekdays - English: 7:00 a.m.*; 5:30 p.m.*

(*in St. Josemaría Chapel located in lower level)

== Chronology of Pastors Who Served at St. Mary of the Angels ==
- Rev. Francis Gordon C.R. (1899–1906)(founder)
- Rev. Joseph Ziemba C.R. (1906)
- Rev. Felix Ladon C.R. (1906–1907)
- Rev. Francis Saborosz C.R. (1907–1908)
- Rev. Francis Gordon C.R. (1909–1931)(founder)
- Rev. Leonard Long C.R. (1931)
- Rev. Thaddeus Ligman C.R. (1931)
- Rev. Edward Brzezinski C.R. (1932–1950)
- Rev. John Grabowski C.R. (1950–1953)
- Rev. Chester Brzegowy C.R. (1953–1957)
- Rev. Anthony Rybarczyk C.R. (1957–1964)
- Rev. Joseph Polinski C.R. (1964–1967)
- Rev. Stanley Majkut C.R. (1967–1974)
- Rev. Edwin Karlowicz C.R. (1974–1984)
- Rev. Richard Grek C.R. (1984–1987)
- Rev. Edwin Lapinski C.R. (1987–1990)
- Rev. John Twist (1991–1993)
- Rev. Hilary Mahaney (1993–2014)
- Rev. John Waiss (2014–2026)
- Rev. Mark Mannion (2026–present)

== Church in books ==
- Howe, Jeffery (2003). Houses of Worship: An Identification Guide to the History and Styles of American religious Architecture. Thunder Bay Press.
- McNamara, Denis R. (2005). Heavenly City: The Architectural Tradition of Catholic Chicago. Liturgy Training Publications.
- Johnson, Elizabeth (1999). Chicago Churches: A Photographic Essay. Uppercase Books Inc.
- Lane, George A. (1982). Chicago Churches and Synagogues: An Architectural Pilgrimage. Loyola Press.
- Kantowicz, Edward R. (2007). The Archdiocese of Chicago: A Journey of Faith. Booklink.
- Kociolek, Jacek (2002). Kościoły Polskie w Chicago {Polish Churches of Chicago} (in Polish). Ex Libris.
- St. Mary of the Angels also appears in The Dresden Files urban fantasy series.

== See also ==
- Polish Cathedral style churches of Chicago
- Polish Hill
- St. Josaphat Basilica
- Immaculate Heart of Mary in Pittsburgh
- Jozef Mazur
- Polish Americans
- Poles in Chicago
- Polish Roman Catholic Union of America
- Roman Catholicism in Poland
- Tadeusz Żukotyński
- Sr. Maria Stanisia
