= Vincent Barzyński =

Polish-American Roman Catholic priest

Ks. Wincenty Barzyński, C.R.

Vincent Barzyński, C.R. (1838–1899) was a Polish-American Roman Catholic priest and organizer of the Polish-American community.

== Life ==
He was born Wincenty Barzyński at Sulisławice, Congress Poland, the son of Józef, an organist, and Maryja (Sroczynska) Barzyński. In baptism he received the name Michał (Michael), but during an illness he was placed under the protection of Vincent Ferrer and henceforth called Wincenty (Vincent). Because of frail health, he was educated privately. In 1856 he entered the diocesan seminary at Lublin and was ordained priest, 28 October 1861. After six months illness spent at the home of his father, he was appointed vicar at Horodło, member of the chapter of the collegiate church of the Zamojscy, and later transferred to Tomaszew, which was the scene of great military activity during the Polish uprising of 1863. As organizer, appointed by the secret Polish national Government, he provided the insurrectionists with military supplies.

Compelled soon after to flee to Kraków, he found refuge with the Franciscan fathers in that city. After fifteen months of wandering he received his passport enabling him to leave for Paris in 1865. Here he fell under the influence of Peter Semenenko, Hieronim Kajsewicz, Aleksander Jełowicki, and Adam Mickiewicz, who dreamed of Poland's resurrection through the spiritual regeneration of the Poles. Going to Rome, he joined the newly founded Congregation of the Resurrection and soon after receiving the special blessing of Pope Pius IX set out for America (1866). After several years' labour in the Diocese of San Antonio, Texas, he was appointed pastor of St. Stanislaus Kostka Parish, Chicago, in 1874, then comprising about 450 families.

Barzyński became a dominant influence during the period of Polish immigration. He gave the American Poles a class consciousness, and took a combative line against the Polish National Alliance. He assisted in the organization of nearly every Polish parish in Chicago established before his death. He built St. Stanislaus Kostka Church and its school (since destroyed by fire and rebuilt), and gave the Poles an orphanage; founded St. Stanislaus Kostka College (which later became Archbishop Weber High School); introduced the Sisters of the Holy Family of Nazareth into the United States; formed a corps of Polish teachers in his own school; and interested the School Sisters of Notre Dame in Polish immigration. He founded the first American Polish Catholic paper, the Gazeta Katolicka, his personal medium for many years, and established the first Polish daily Catholic paper in America, the Dziennik Chicagoski, against the in liberal press, particularly Zgoda, the publication of the Polish National Alliance. He founded the Polish Roman Catholic Union.

He died in Chicago on May 2, 1899. By this time, St. Stanislaus Kostka Parish had grown to 40,000 members, and nearby Holy Trinity Parish had 25,000 members. His funeral was one of the largest Chicago had ever seen: 10,000 marchers, 500 funeral carriages, and 150 clergymen, not counting spectators.
