= Holy Trinity Church (Chicago) =

Parish in Illinois, US

Coordinates: 41°54′8.4″N 87°39′46″W

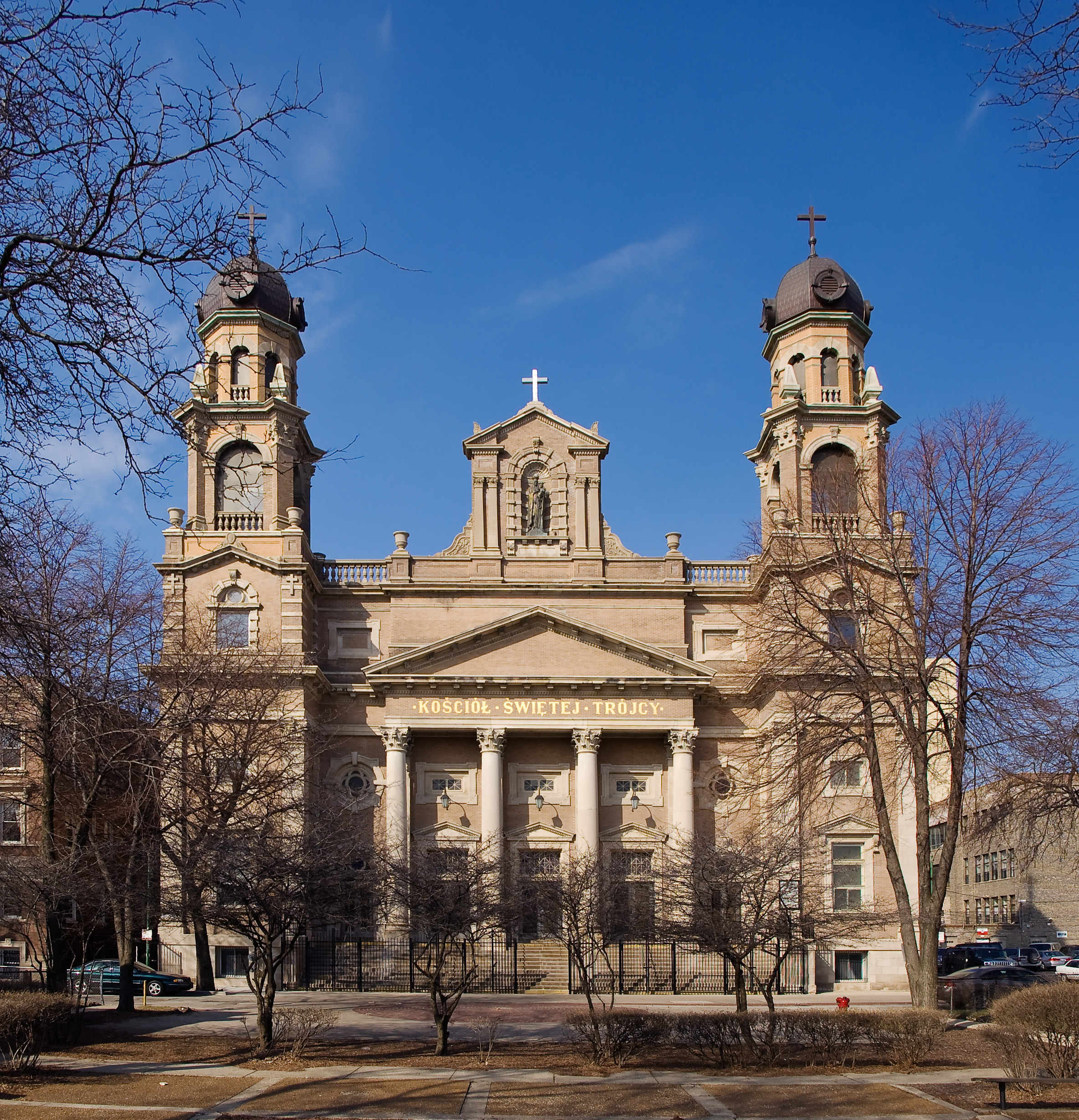

- Location within Chicago metropolitan area
- Location: 1118 North Noble Street; Chicago
- Country: United States
- Denomination: Catholic Church
- Website: Holy Trinity Polish Mission

History
- Status: Mission church
- Founded: 1872
- Founder: Polish immigrants
- Dedication: Holy Trinity
- Dedicated: 1873
- Consecrated: 1909

Architecture
- Functional status: Active
- Heritage designation: For Polish immigrants
- Architect: William Krieg
- Architectural type: Church
- Style: Polish Cathedral style
- Groundbreaking: 1905
- Completed: October 1906
- Construction cost: $200,000

Specifications
- Materials: Brick

Holy Trinity Church (Polish: Kościół Trójcy Świętej) is a historic Catholic church of the Archdiocese of Chicago located at 1118 North Noble Street. It is a prime example of the so-called Polish cathedral style of churches, in both its opulence and grand scale. Along with such monumental religious edifices as St. Mary of the Angels, St. Hedwig's or St. John Cantius, it is one of the many Polish churches that dominate over the Kennedy Expressway in the Pulaski Park neighborhood of Chicago.

Holy Trinity Church is the home of the Holy Trinity Polish Mission since 1987.

== History ==
Holy Trinity was founded in 1872 to relieve overcrowding at St. Stanislaus Kostka, the city's first Polish parish. A bell from the original church building can be found behind the current building. A twenty-year feud between the two parishes ensued, and the parish was not recognized canonically until the Vatican sent an Apostolic Delegate to resolve the issue. The Congregation of Holy Cross was selected to serve the parish under the leadership of Casimir Sztuczko. The parish was long identified with the Polish National Alliance since many its parishioners were the Alliance's most active members. Construction of the Kennedy Expressway which cut through the heart of Chicago's Polonia began a period of decline for the parish as many long-time residents were forced to relocate. Attorney General Robert F. Kennedy attended Mass here as part of the festivities surrounding the annual Polish Constitution Day Parade in 1961. The parish came under the jurisdiction of The Resurrectionists in 1975 and in 1988 of the Society of Christ Fathers who continue to administer it. As a cultural node for Chicago's Polish Community, the church has hosted elected officials from Poland and the United States, such as Robert F. Kennedy and Malgorzata Gosiewska. On September 14, 2006, the parish hosted Polish Prime Minister Jarosław Kaczyński during a Mass celebrating his visit to Chicago.

Shots of Holy Trinity Polish Mission can be seen throughout Call Northside 777 (1948) starring James Stewart, the first Hollywood feature film to be shot on location in Chicago.

== Architecture ==
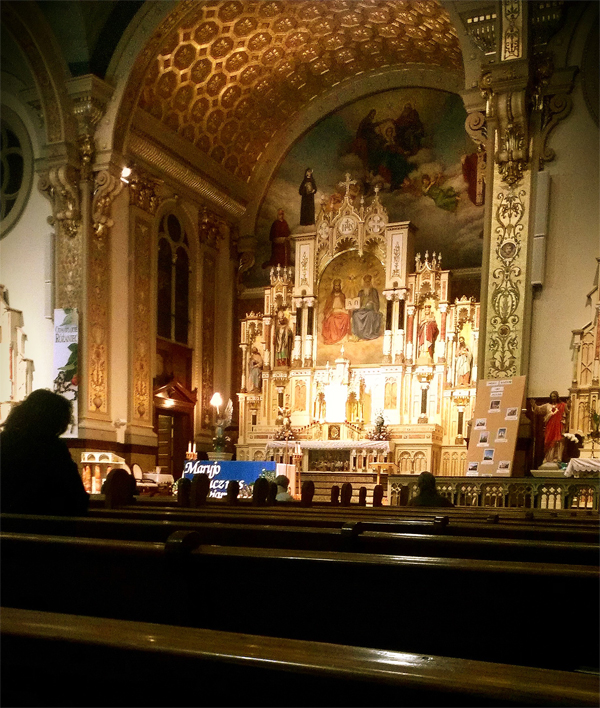
View of the altar during evening mass

The original plans were drawn by A.O. Von Herbulis, but were scaled-down to fit the resources of the parish. Local architect William Krieg drew the final version of the plans and construction began in 1905 with completion by October 1906.

The building combines a variety of styles. Two towers flank the entrance, which features a monumental portico supported by four Corinthian columns. Corinthian pilasters and pediments adorn the openings in the lower portions of the towers; higher up, toward the cupolas, the decoration becomes exuberantly baroque. A baroque superstructure, constructed primarily of brick and stone, rises above the portico, but the interior segmental arches and the skeletons of the towers are of iron. Inside the church the north and south windows are Gothic-Romanesque in style.

This blend of styles is reminiscent of the many churches of Poland built during the Middle Ages and, after being damaged by war or fire, were rebuilt and remodeled to suit later tastes. Often the money was exhausted before the remodeling could be completed so that the exterior was executed in one style and the interior in another. The architect of Holy Trinity evidently followed the pattern of things remembered, hoping to give the congregation a feeling of the old country.

The turn-of-the-century church interior retains its original form. It is spacious at 125 by 200 feet (38 m × 61 m)) and richly decorated. The segmental vaults are tripartite but, being of iron construction, have no supporting columns. Murals of religious scenes cover the walls, including a grouping depicting the patron saints of Poland. All the windows are stained glass and represent sacred symbols familiar to the Polish immigrants who founded the parish, such as the Black Madonna over the altar of St. Francis of Assisi; Our Lady of the Gate of Dawn glows richly above the altar of the Sacred Heart. Other windows feature small windows of Polish Saints and martyrs as well as Polish eagles and folkloric motifs.

K. Markiewicz executed the interior decorations of Holy Trinity in 1914 by and the mural paintings on the vaults were completed in 1926. The fine stained glass windows were selected in 1940 and installed in 1955. Most were installed by a well-known Polish artist, Irena Lorentowicz. A figure of Our Lady Queen of Emigrants by Professor Wiktor Zin was brought to the church and blessed by Cardinal Joseph Bernardin in 1990. In 1992, an urn filled with soil from Kharkiv, Katyn and Mednoye in the former Soviet Union. Each of these sites contained mass graves of Poles murdered during World War II. The congregation installed memorial plaques in the narthex in 1993 and 1994 to honor Casimir Sztuczko, CSC, the longtime pastor of Holy Trinity who oversaw the building of the current church, and to commemorate the 50th anniversary of the Battle of Monte Cassino, respectively. The Millennium Doors, by artist Jerzy Kenar, began welcoming visitors into the sanctuary in 2000. In honor of the 100th anniversary of the construction of the current church, the congregation began a renovation campaign in 2005. Work included installing new copper cupolas the two church towers, new granite tile in the presbytery, and the painting and refurbishing the interior. The area above the choir received a new mural depicting St. Cecilia in the company of an angelic choir. Other new depictions include St. Faustina, Cardinala Stefan Wyszynski and August Hlond and Pope John Paul II were added to reflect Saintly cults popular among today's Polish community. The parish obtained relics of St. Gianna Beretta Molla, Karolina Kózka and Padre Pio for adoration by parishioners.

== Catacombs ==
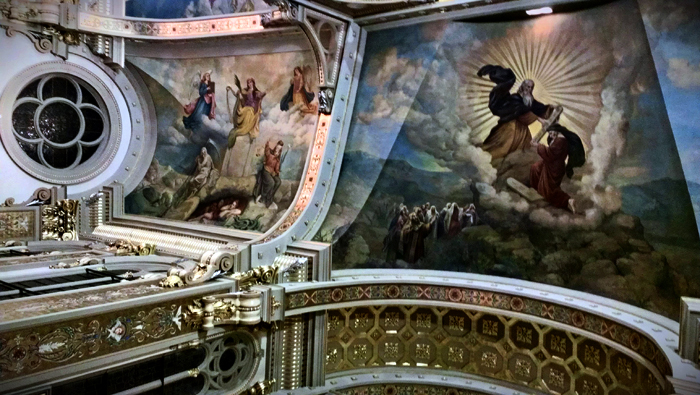
Portion of the ceiling mural, depicting various scenes (sideways)

Casimir Sztuczko CSC, the long-time pastor of Holy Trinity who oversaw the building of the present church, wished to have an area set aside to venerate the holy relics of saints and the beatified. The result is one of the most distinctive and interesting aspects of Holy Trinity, the so-called catacombs, inspired by the underground cemetery meeting places where early Christians met while the religion was still illegal in the Roman Empire. The catacombs are found beneath the area formerly occupied by the lower church, and consist of a winding path lined with niches containing saintly relics leading up to the chamber containing the grave of Christ. This was the first area of the church restored during the centennial renovation campaign, as it had become dilapidated over the years, particularly during the period when the parish was marked for liquidation. The parish obtained relics of new saints and a collection of stones from Biblical sites in the Holy Land. The 'catacombs' are open on Sundays after Masses and during the liturgical season of Lent. Relics of the following saints are found in the catacombs, a number of which are represented by more than one reliquary:

- Saint Adalbert
- Saint Andrew Bobola
- Saint Anthony of Padua
- Saint Brigid of Kildare
- Saint Clare of Assisi
- Saint Casimir
- Saint Catherine of Alexandria
- Saint Cyril of Alexandria
- Saint Elizabeth of Hungary
- Saint Florian
- Saint Hedwig of Silesia
- Saint Hyacinth of Poland
- Saint Jean Eudes, C. J. M.
- Saint John Cantius
- Saint John Vianney
- Saint Josaphat Kuntsevych
- Blessed Karolina Kózka
- Saint Kinga
- Saint Louis of France
- Saint Mary Faustina Kowalska
- St. Matthew the Evangelist
- Saint Mauritius
- Saint Peter Canisius
- Padre Pio
- Blessed Salomea of Poland
- Saint Stanislaus of Szczepanów
- Saint Thérèse de Lisieux

== Church in architecture books ==
- Howe, Jeffery (2003). Houses of Worship: An Identification Guide to the History and Styles of American religious Architecture. Thunder Bay Press.
- McNamara, Denis R. (2005). Heavenly City: The Architectural Tradition of Catholic Chicago. Liturgy Training Publications.
- Johnson, Elizabeth (1999). Chicago Churches: A Photographic Essay. Uppercase Books Inc.
- Lane, George A. (1982). Chicago Churches and Synagogues: An Architectural Pilgrimage. Loyola Press.
- Kantowicz, Edward R. (2007). The Archdiocese of Chicago: A Journey of Faith. Booklink.
- Kociolek, Jacek (2002). Kościoły Polskie w Chicago {Polish Churches of Chicago} (in Polish). Ex Libris.

== See also ==
- Polish cathedral style churches of Chicago
- Polish Americans
- Poles in Chicago
- Sister Mary Stanisia
- Tadeusz Żukotyński
- Roman Catholicism in Poland
