= St. Stanislaus Kostka Church (Pittsburgh) =

Historic church in Pennsylvania, United States

- St. Stanislaus Kostka Roman Catholic Church
- U.S. National Register of Historic Places
- Pittsburgh Landmark – PHLF
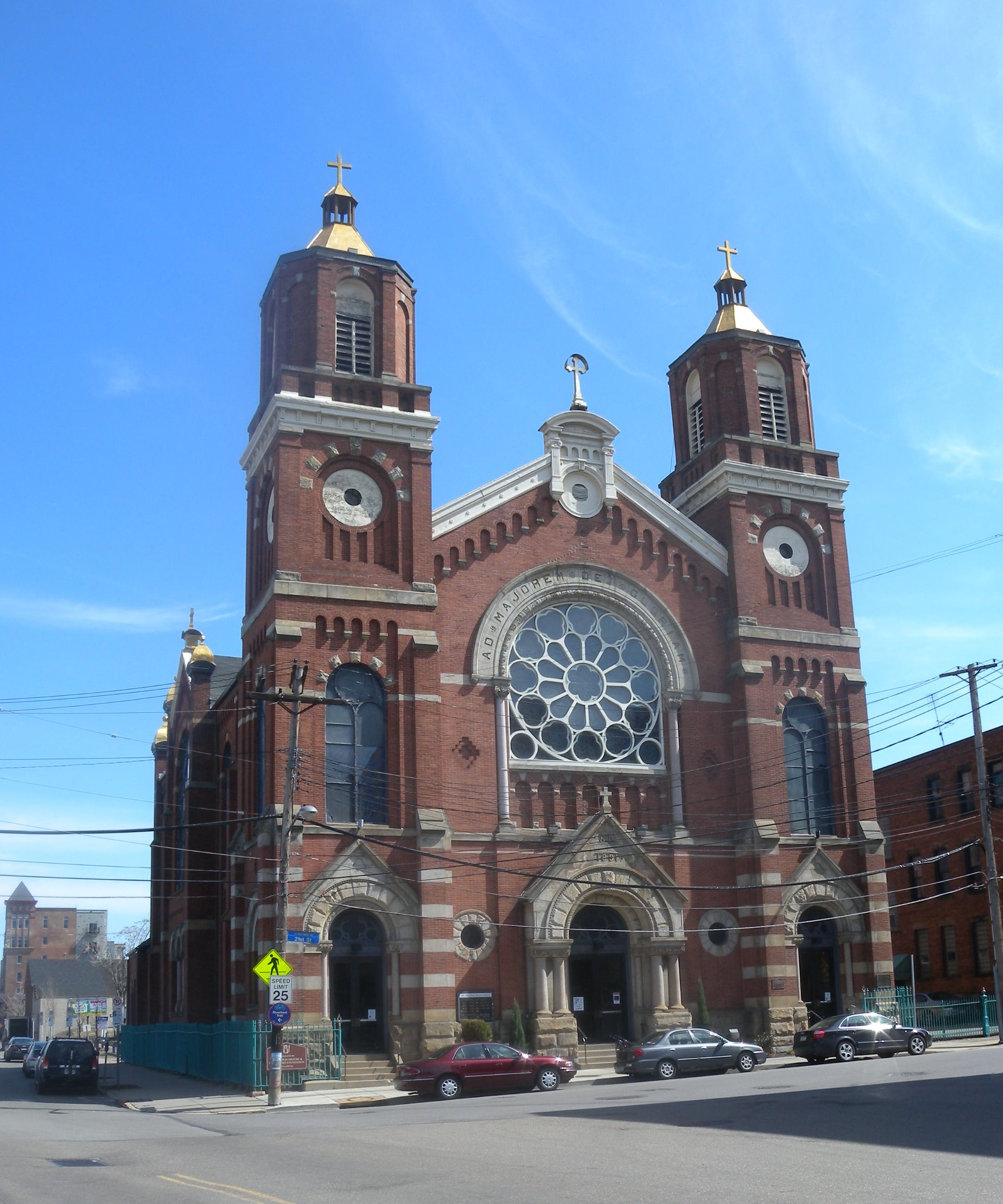

- Location within Pittsburgh Location within Pennsylvania Location within the United States
- Location: 21st and Smallman Sts., Pittsburgh, Pennsylvania
- Coordinates: 40°27′8.36″N 79°59′1″W
- Built: 1891–1892
- Architect: Frederick C. Sauer (1860–1942)
- Architectural style: Romanesque
- NRHP reference No.: 72001089

Significant dates
- Added to NRHP: September 14, 1972
- Designated PHLF: 1970

St. Stanislaus Kostka Church in Pittsburgh, Pennsylvania, referred to in Polish as Kościół Świętego Stanisława Kostki, is a historic church of the Roman Catholic Diocese of Pittsburgh. Located in the Strip District in Pittsburgh, Pennsylvania, United States, it is a prime example of the so-called 'Polish Cathedral' style of churches. It is known also as 21st and Smallman Street Church. It is listed on the U.S. National Register of Historic Places.

== History ==
The congregation was formed in 1873 when 200 Polish families banded together to form the St. Stanislaus Kostka Beneficial Society. The first pastor was Antoni Klawiter, who arrived in October 1875 and left in 1877. The availability of unskilled mill jobs in Pittsburgh in the late 19th century attracted a flood of immigrants from Eastern Europe. By 1915, more than 80% of Strip District residents were foreign-born, and 30% were Polish. St. Stanislaus Kostka Church was constructed in 1891, designed by Pittsburgh architect Frederick C. Sauer (1860–1942).

In March 1936 there was a disastrous flood on Saint Patrick's Day. Water flooded the church as high as the top of the wainscoting on the walls. The pews were afloat and the Pastor was trapped in the rectory on the second floor. In December 1936, an explosion at the Pittsburgh Banana Company weakened the towers and the original baroque style bonnets were removed. Examples of the bonnet style are still found on the top of the sidewall pilasters and the ventilation cupola on the center of the roof. Three of the medallion windows over the altars were also covered over.

On September 20, 1969, Cardinal Karol Wojtyła, the future Pope John Paul II, visited and offered prayers at St. Stanislaus Kostka. After cordial greetings, the Cardinal is quoted as commenting on how beautiful the church was and how it reminded him of the churches in Poland. He knelt in prayer before the Blessed Sacrament and then to the Side Altar of the Blessed Virgin Mary, now the location of a humble memorial to the Pope.

== Architecture ==
Saint Stanislaus Kostka's architectural style is a blend of Romanesque and Baroque, with Byzantine influences. Construction of the present Saint Stanislaus Kostka church was started in April 1891, and the church was consecrated on July 31, 1892. The church is a one-story brick edifice covering an area of 8,337 square feet (774.5 m^{2}). The church is built on the ground surface, and there is no basement. The walls are from 17 to 21 inches (430 to 530 mm) thick. The church measures 67 feet (20 m) wide and 105 feet (32 m) deep and stands 63 feet (19 m) high. In 1936, the church endured flood and explosion damage.

The twin towers support a total of seven bells. The right tower holds the St. Michel bell 2,500 lb (1,100 kg), the St. Barbara bell 1,200 lb (540 kg) and the St. Anthony bell 750 lb (340 kg). The left tower holds the St. Casimer bell 1,800 lb (820 kg), the St. Joseph bell 1,000 lb (450 kg), the St. Rosa bell 750 lb (340 kg) and the St. Stanislaus bell 550 lb (250 kg). Five of these bells were electrified in 1956.

The stained glass figure windows were produced in Munich, Germany, at the Royal Bavarian Art Institute at a cost of $27,672—a major expenditure for that time. Compared with today's dollar value it would cost almost $538,000. According to experts, the windows in the Saint Stanislaus Kostka Church are some of the best period "Munich Style" stained glass in the United States.

There are three Latin inscriptions in the church interior.

On the front of old main altar: Se Nascens Deditsocium "By his birth He offers himself as a companion"

On the altar canopy: Se Moriens In Praetium "Dying, he offers himself as victim."

On the window over the altar canopy: Se Regnans Dat In Praemium "Reigning, He offers himself as a reward."

On the Christ the King center window above the crown, in Christ's hand is a banner which reads: Qui Vicerit Dabei Sedere, Mecum In Throno Meo "He who has conquered (God) will grant you to sit with me on my throne"

The original interior also did not have the murals we see today as the murals have changed over the years. The current paintings in the semi-dome over the altar were done by the Italian artist, Vincent Scatena and were completed for the Golden Jubilee of the parish in 1925.

== See also ==
- Polish Hill
- Immaculate Heart of Mary
- Jozef Mazur
- Polish Americans
- Polish Roman Catholic Union of America
- Roman Catholicism in Poland
- Tadeusz Żukotyński
- Sr. Maria Stanisia
