= Immaculate Heart of Mary Church (Pittsburgh) =

- Kościół Matki Boskiej
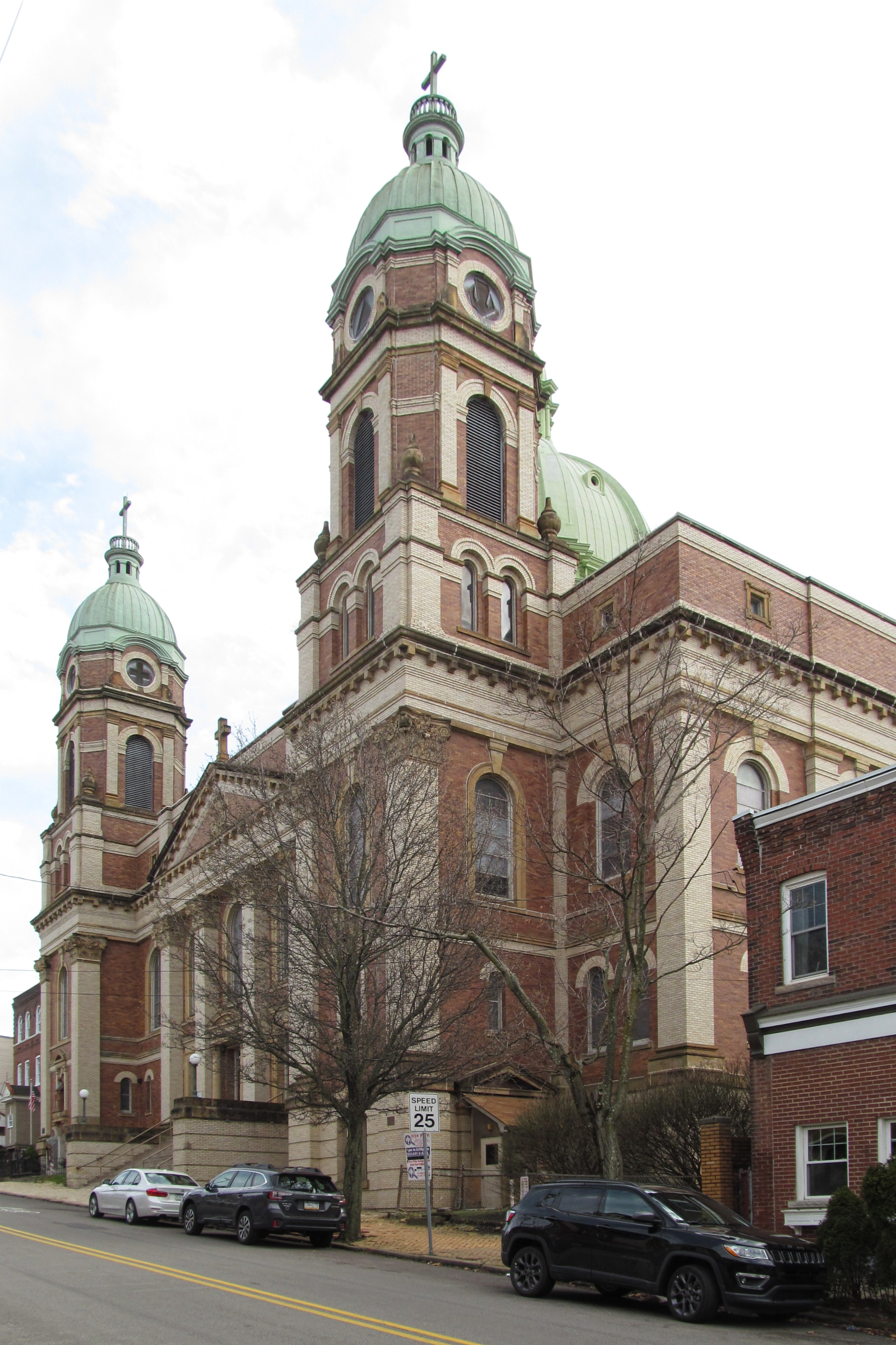
- The church in 2022

- Location within Pittsburgh

General information
- Type: Parish church
- Architectural style: Renaissance Revival, Polish Cathedral style
- Location: 3058 Brereton Street, Pittsburgh, Pennsylvania, United States
- Coordinates: 40°27′23″N 79°58′4″W
- Construction started: July 31, 1904
- Inaugurated: December 3, 1905

Design and construction
- Architect: William P. Ginther

Website
- immaculateheartpolishhill.weebly.com

Pittsburgh Landmark – PHLF
- Designated: 1970

Immaculate Heart of Mary Church in Pittsburgh, referred to in Polish as Kościół Matki Boskiej, is a historic church of the Catholic Diocese of Pittsburgh. Located on Polish Hill in Pittsburgh, Pennsylvania, it is a prime example of the so-called 'Polish Cathedral' style of churches in both its opulence and grand scale. The church was designated a historic landmark by the Pittsburgh History and Landmarks Foundation in 1970.

Immaculate Heart of Mary remains an active parish church in the Diocese of Pittsburgh as of 2023. In 2019 it was reorganized as a personal (non-territorial) parish within the Shrines of Pittsburgh, a grouping of six churches with unique histories which the diocese hoped to promote as pilgrimage and visitor destinations.

== History ==
Immaculate Heart of Mary was founded in 1897 as a Polish ethnic parish. Beginning in 1885, Polish immigrants began settling on Herron Hill in Pittsburgh. Eventually so many immigrants settled there that the area was renamed Polish Hill. At first, the residents attended St. Stanislaus parish in the Strip District, but by 1895, the population of Polish Hill grew to the point that a committee of local citizens petitioned the bishop for their own parish. Permission was granted and the cornerstone of a combined church, school, and convent was laid in October 1896. The completed building was dedicated in August 1897. The top floor of the four-story building served as the church, while the lower floors housed classrooms and living quarters for the teaching nuns.

In 1899, the parish purchased land for a larger church. William P. Ginther, a prolific Akron, Ohio, architect who specialized in ecclesiastical buildings, designed the new structure. The cornerstone was laid on July 31, 1904, and the completed church was dedicated by Diomede Falconio, Apostolic Delegate to the United States, on December 3, 1905. Like a number of other Polish churches in the so-called Polish Cathedral style such as St. Mary of the Angels in Chicago or St. Josaphat's Basilica in Milwaukee, the architectural plans for the church were intentionally modeled on St. Peter's Basilica in Rome. This church still serves the community of Polish Hill today.

This parish was the first in the United States of America to have the Divine Mercy Novena. They continue to have the novena and to have a very large celebration of Divine Mercy Sunday, the Sunday immediately after Easter Sunday.

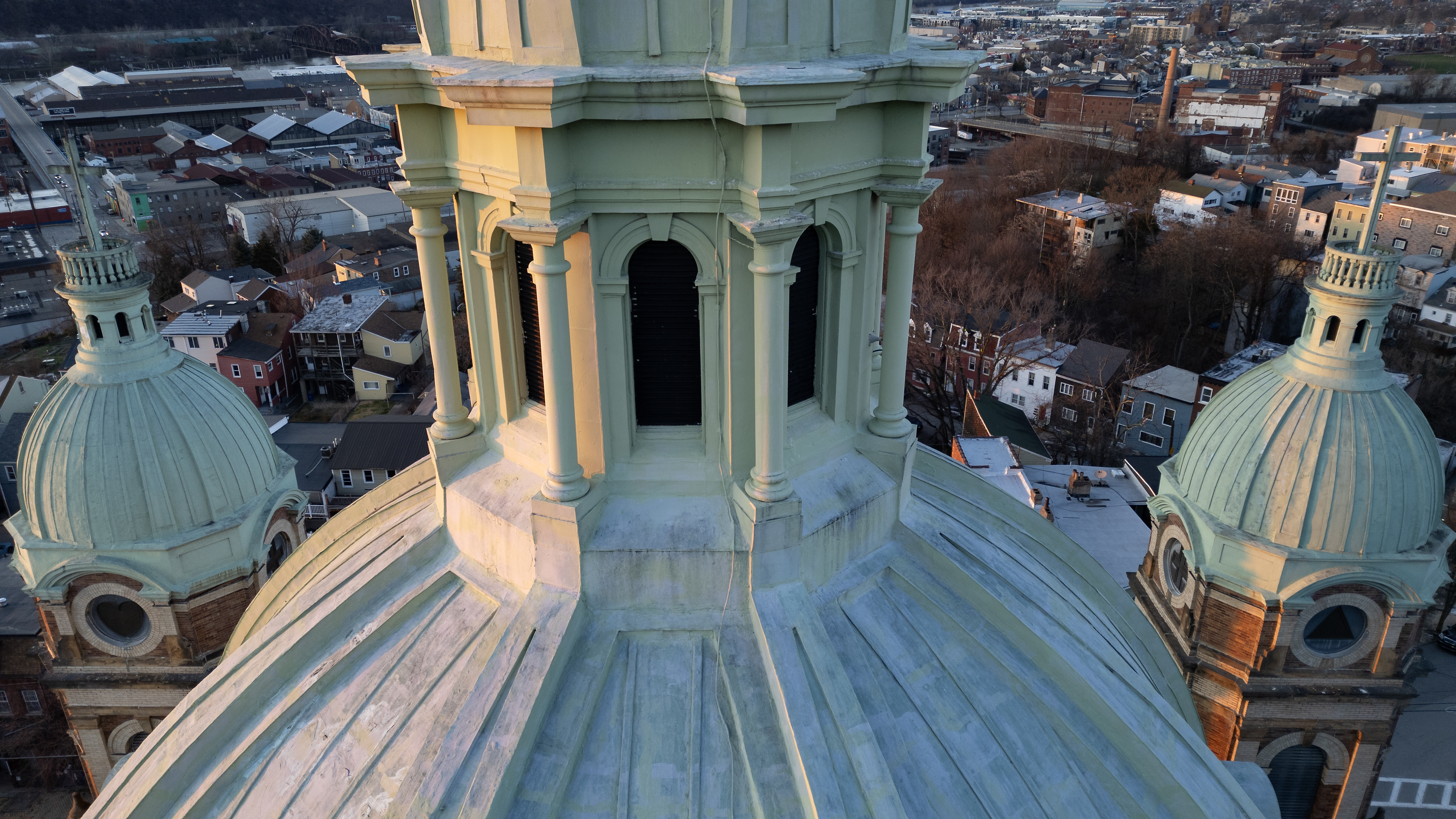
The copper dome and spires of Immaculate Heart of Mary Church. Photo by Steven Adams.

== Architecture ==
The church is an example of Renaissance Revival architecture, specifically the Baroque-influenced Polish Cathedral style. Architectural historian Walter C. Kidney described the building as the "most Baroque" of Pittsburgh's churches.

Loosely modeled after St. Peter's Basilica, the church is 200 feet (61 m) long and 110 feet (34 m) wide, and is positioned with the long axis parallel to the street. The building is organized around a central dome which is 50 feet (15 m) in diameter and has an internal height of 98 feet (30 m). The exterior of the dome measures 138 feet (42 m) to the highest balustrade, with a 12-foot (3.7 m) cross on top. The church is constructed from brick in two contrasting colors, gray and brown, with Indiana limestone trim. The front elevation is classically ordered with Composite pilasters, a central pediment, and two 116-foot (35 m) domed towers. The interior has a 43-foot (13 m) vaulted ceiling and a seating capacity of 1,800.

== Gallery ==
Immaculate Heart of Mary Church, Polish Hill

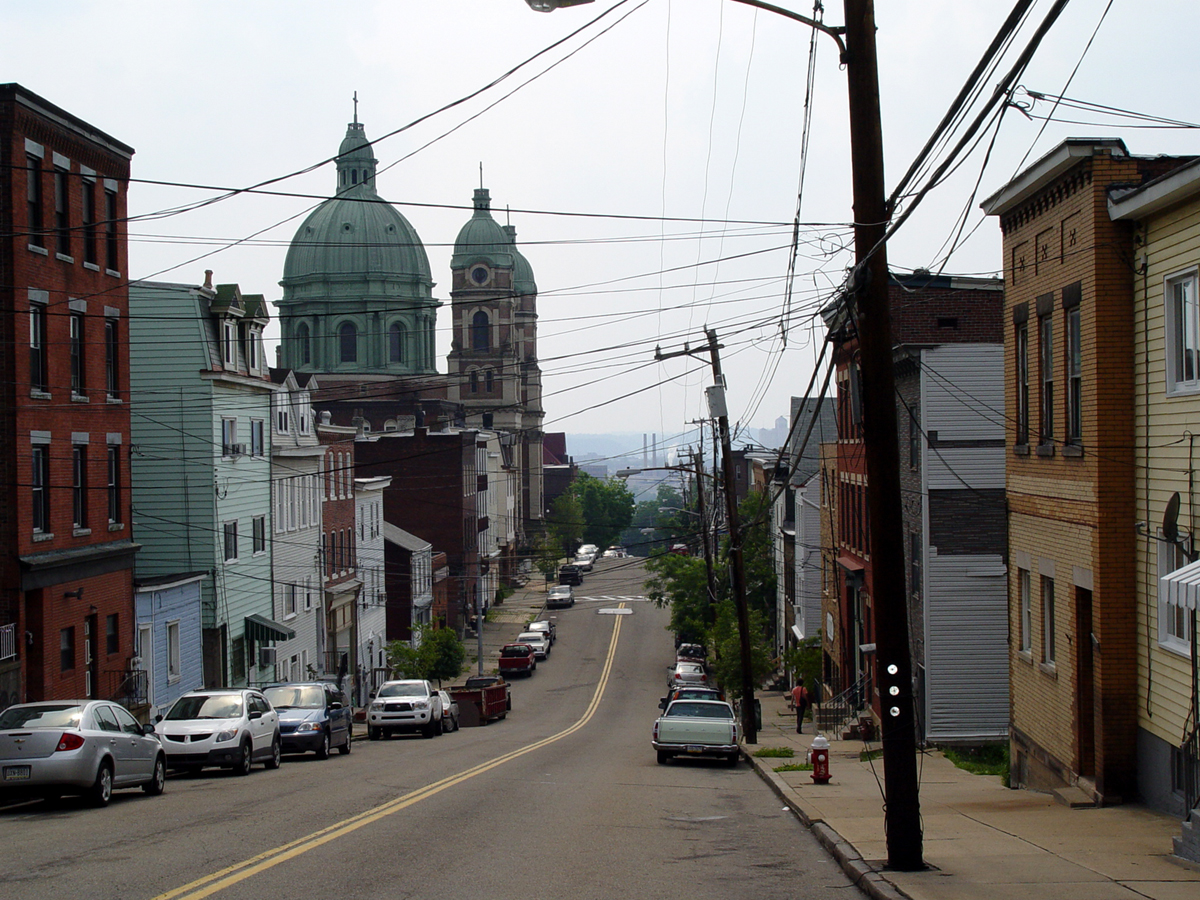
View looking west on Brereton Street.

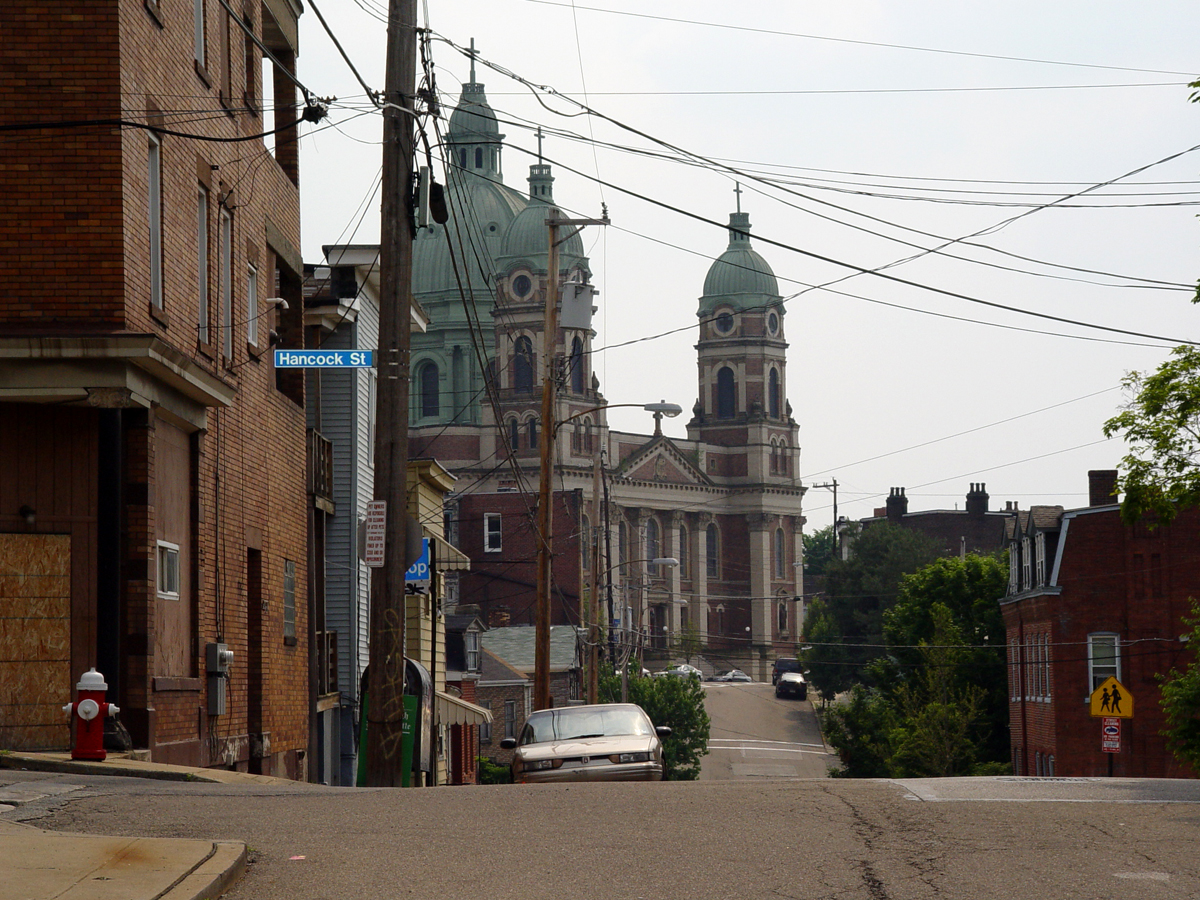
View looking west on Dobson Street.

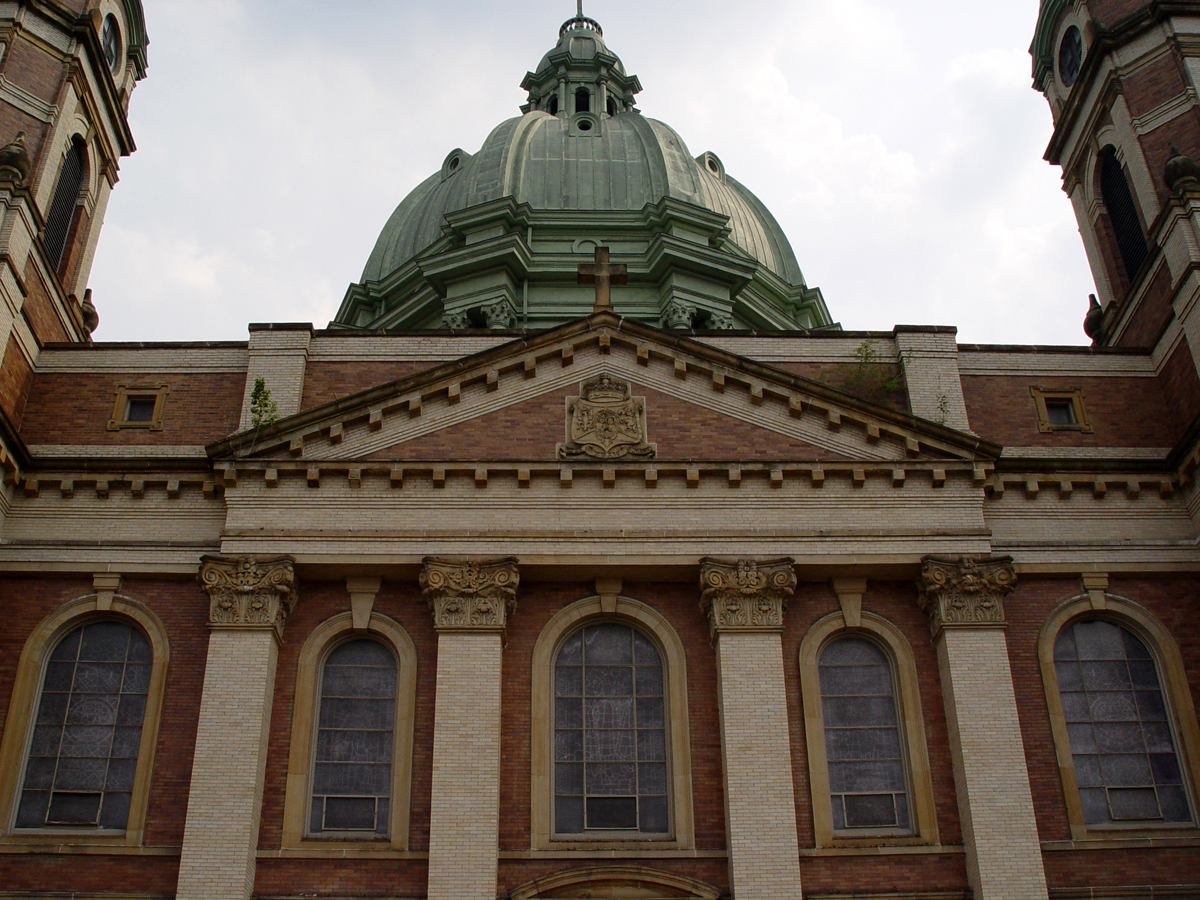
View from front of structure.
