= Jerzy Kenar =

Polish-American sculptor

Jerzy S. Kenar is a Polish-American sculptor in the United States. Kenar works in wood, bronze as well as in an Acrylic-based composite.

== Life ==
Born on January 19, 1948, in the town of Iwonicz-Zdrój, he left Poland permanently in 1973 for Sweden after quitting the State Higher School of Fine Arts. In 1979, he emigrated to the United States, where he opened the Wooden Gallery in Chicago in 1980.

== Opened Businesses ==
=== Wooden Gallery ===
This gallery is currently a cultural hub for Chicago's Polonia, hosting many exhibits, shows and meetings with many famous figures. His career soared in the mid-1990s with his commissions to decorate Chicago's O'Hare International Airport, which houses a number of his pieces, and the city's Harold Washington Library. He has done work for a number of churches in the Chicago area, such as the interior design for St. Constance in Jefferson Park, wooden artwork for St. Kevin in South Deering, as well as the Millennium Doors for one of Chicago's 'Polish Cathedrals', Holy Trinity Church. He is also a generous patron of Chicago's art scene.

=== Studio Kenar ===
Jerzy opened Studio Kenar in 1985, which contained many of his famous artworks.
