= St. Hedwig's Church (Chicago) =

Coordinates: 41°55′17.8″N 87°40′50.7″W

St. Hedwig Church
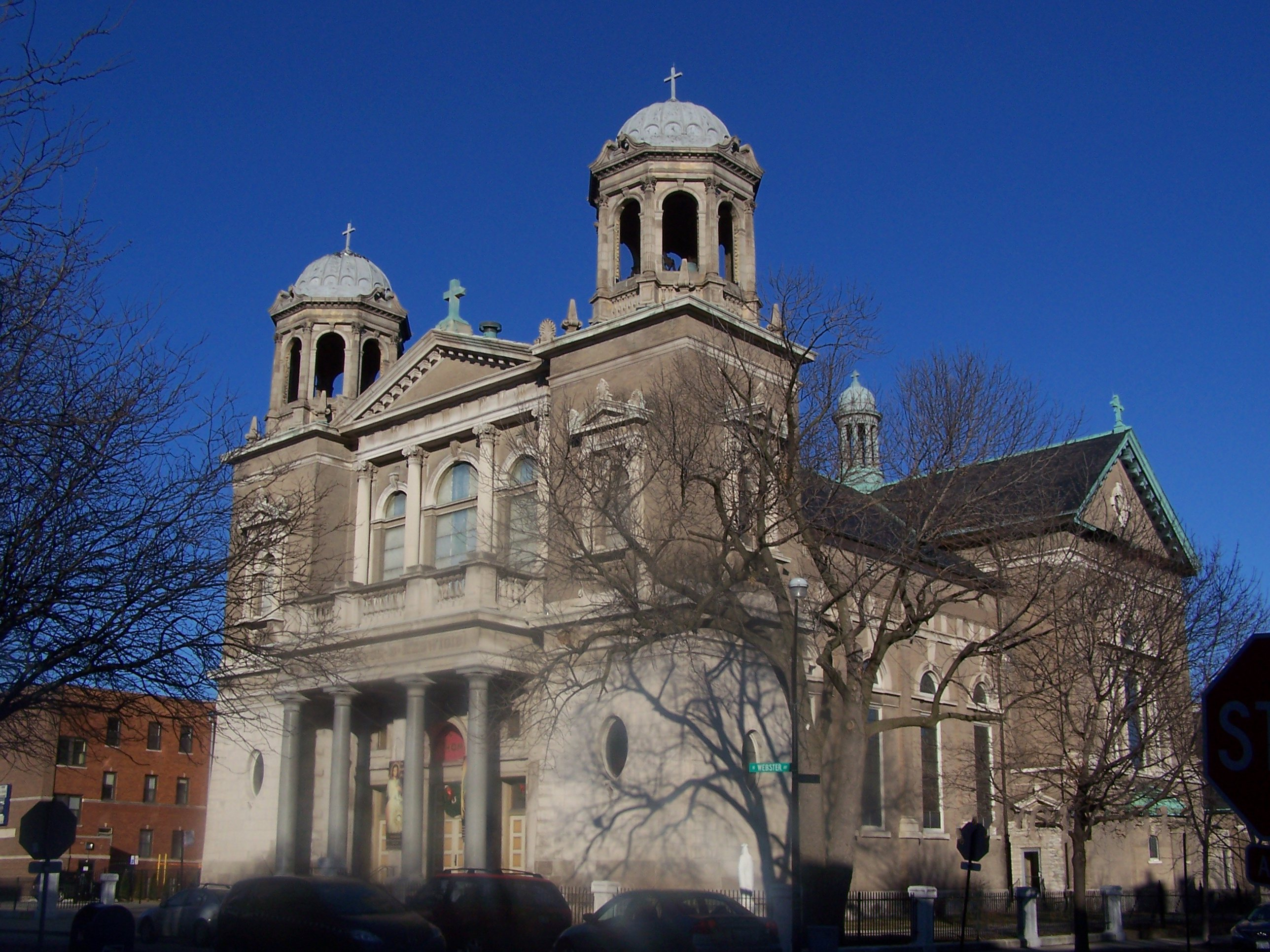

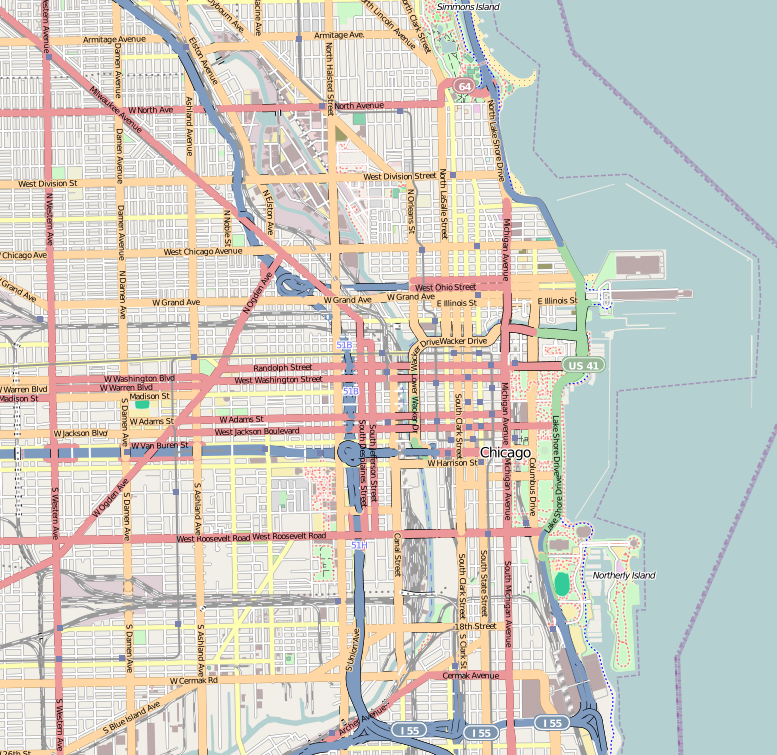
- Location: 2226 North Hoyne; Chicago, Illinois
- Country: United States
- Denomination: Roman Catholic
- Website: Blessed Carlo Acutis Parish

History
- Status: Parish church
- Founded: 1888
- Founder: Congregation of the Resurrection
- Dedication: St. Hedwig
- Dedicated: October 27, 1901

Architecture
- Functional status: Active
- Architect: Adolphus Druiding
- Architectural type: Church
- Style: Renaissance
- Groundbreaking: June 18, 1899
- Completed: 1901
- Construction cost: $160,000

Specifications
- Materials: Brick

Administration
- Province: Chicago
- Archdiocese: Chicago

Clergy
- Pastor(s): Rev. Edward J. Howe, CR

St. Hedwig's Church (Polish: Kościół Świętej Jadwigi) is a historic parish church of the Roman Catholic Archdiocese of Chicago located in Chicago, Illinois. Constructed in the grand Polish Cathedral style, it is one of the many monumental Polish churches visible from the Kennedy Expressway. The church is located at 2226 North Hoyne Avenue.

== History ==
Founded in 1888 by the Resurrectionist Order who administered St. Stanislaus Kostka, the first Polish parish in Chicago. In the 1890s a group of parishioners who resented the dominance of the Resurrectionists culminating in the so-called “Pepper Riots”, where a crowd of 3,000 protesters broke into the foyer and assaulted the resident priests inside. When the police intervened, the protesters threw red pepper into their eyes. The end result was that shots were fired and dozens were injured, including one policeman who was struck by a hammer. The disgruntled anti-Resurrectionists broke off from the parish to form an independent church, which became All Saints Cathedral of the Polish National Catholic Church. Pope John Paul II visited the parish as Bishop of Cracow in 1977, just one year before his election as pope. St. Hedwig's is still administered by the Resurrectionists, although it now has a large Latino and Filipino population. The surrounding neighborhood of Bucktown has in recent years become newly prosperous and gentrified. Mass is now celebrated in English, Polish and Spanish.

On May 2, 1965, three men broke into the church. They stole $400 from the donation boxes and started a fire destroying the sacristy and side altar cause great damage. According to an article published by the Chicago Tribune, the three culprits that were caught eventually pleaded guilty and later were sentenced to prison terms.

A basement fire broke out on April 9, 2008, burning a 15 foot by 3 feet hole underneath the altar, leaving no injuries, but destroying the original statue of Our Lady of Manaoag brought to Chicago 17 years earlier.

In July 2021, St. Hedwig Church and St. John Berchmans Church in Logan Square were united to form a new parish under the patronage of Blessed Carlo Acutis.

== Architecture ==
The church building was completed at a cost of $160,000 in 1901 and designed by Adolphus Druiding who also drew up architectural plans for St. John Cantius. Like many of Chicago's Polish Cathedrals, its Renaissance style recalls the glory days of the Polish Commonwealth in the 15th and 16th centuries. The interior of St. Hedwig's features a series of paintings by Thaddeus von Zukotynski as well as the work of John A. Mallin done for the Parish Jubilee in 1938. The aedicula above the entry is echoed by a pedimented reredos behind the altar. Made of brick and Bedford limestone it has a seating capacity of 1500. Other artistic treasures in the church include the stained glass windows imported from Bavaria.

== Church in architecture books ==
- Sinkevitch, Alice (2004). The AIA Guide to Chicago. Harvest Books.
- Schulze, Franz; Harrington, Kevin (2003). Chicago's Famous Buildings. University Of Chicago Press.
- McNamara, Denis R. (2005). Heavenly City: The Architectural Tradition of Catholic Chicago. Liturgy Training Publications. ISBN 9781568545035.
- Chiat, Marylin (2004). The Spiritual Traveler: Chicago and Illinois: A Guide to Sacred Sites and Peaceful Places. HiddenSpring.
- Lane, George A. (1982). Chicago Churches and Synagogues: An Architectural Pilgrimage. Loyola Press.
- Kantowicz, Edward R. (2007). The Archdiocese of Chicago: A Journey of Faith. Booklink.
- Kociolek, Jacek (2002). Kościoły Polskie w Chicago {Polish Churches of Chicago} (in Polish). Ex Libris.

== See also ==
- Tadeusz Żukotyński, Catholic fine art painter and mural artist
- Sr. Maria Stanisia, Polish-American fine art painter and restoration artist
- Jozef Mazur, Polish-American painter and stained glass artist
- Polish Cathedral style churches of Chicago
- Polish Americans
- Poles in Chicago
- Polish Roman Catholic Union of America
- Roman Catholicism in Poland
