= SS. Cyril and Methodius in Lemont =

Coordinates: 41.6702°N 87.9945°W

SS. Cyril and Methodius Church
- Location within the United States
- Location: Lemont
- Country: United States
- Denomination: Roman Catholic
- Website: SS Cyril and Methodius's Parish

History
- Founded: 1884
- Founder: Polish immigrants
- Dedication: SS. Cyril and Methodius

Architecture
- Functional status: Active
- Heritage designation: For Polish immigrants
- Architect: Erhard Brielmaier
- Architectural type: Church
- Style: Polish Cathedral style
- Completed: 1929

Specifications
- Materials: Brick

SS. Cyril and Methodius in Lemont (Polish: Kościół Świętego Cyryla i Metodego) - historic church of the Roman Catholic Archdiocese of Chicago, located in Lemont, Illinois.

It is a prime example of the so-called 'Polish Cathedral style' of churches in both its opulence and grand scale. Along with the Hindu Temple of Greater Chicago, it is one of the two monumental religious edifices that dominate the Lemont skyline.

== History ==
Poles are noted in the Lemont area as early as 1860 working in the local quarries. SS. Cyril and Methodius parish was founded in 1884 as a Polish parish. The surrounding area was called Jasna Góra, in reverence to the shrine of the Black Madonna in Poland. The parish offers mass in both Polish and English and is currently home to 1,965 families.

== Architecture ==
The church was designed by Erhard Brielmaier, and sons, who are most well known for their design of the magnificent St. Josaphat Basilica in Milwaukee as well as the now closed parish of St. Salomea in Roseland. The Romanesque style edifice was completed in 1929, replacing a former church that burned down in 1928. Some of the church's highlights are the beautiful original rose window, the new entryway, and the church's steeple which is the highest elevation in all of Cook County, Illinois.

== Patron saints ==
Cyril and Methodius were brothers born of Macedonian nobility, who became priests in Constantinople. They evangelized to the Slavic peoples, translated the liturgy into Slavonic and made numerous converts. They are also credited with devising and spreading the Glagolitic alphabet, which was used for Slavonic manuscripts before the development of the Cyrillic, the alphabet derived from Glagolitic, that, with small modifications, is still used in a number of Slavic languages. Both brothers were canonized in The Eastern Orthodox Church as "equal-to-apostles". In the Roman Catholic Church they are also jointly revered as Apostles to the Slavs and their cult was further glorified in 1980 when Pope John Paul II declared them the patron saints of Europe.

== Church in architecture books ==
- Sinkevitch, Alice (2004). The AIA Guide to Chicago. Harvest Books.
- Schulze, Franz; Harrington, Kevin (2003). Chicago's Famous Buildings. University Of Chicago Press.
- McNamara, Denis R. (2005). Heavenly City: The Architectural Tradition of Catholic Chicago. Liturgy Training Publications.
- Chiat, Marylin (2004). The Spiritual Traveler: Chicago and Illinois: A Guide to Sacred Sites and Peaceful Places. HiddenSpring.
- Lane, George A. (1982). Chicago Churches and Synagogues: An Architectural Pilgrimage. Loyola Press.
- Kantowicz, Edward R. (2007). The Archdiocese of Chicago: A Journey of Faith. Booklink.
- Kociolek, Jacek (2002). Kościoły Polskie w Chicago {Polish Churches of Chicago} (in Polish). Ex Libris.

== See also ==
- Polish Cathedral style churches of Chicago
- Polish Americans
- Roman Catholicism in Poland
