= Polish cathedral style =

Architectural design influenced by Polish Catholic immigrants

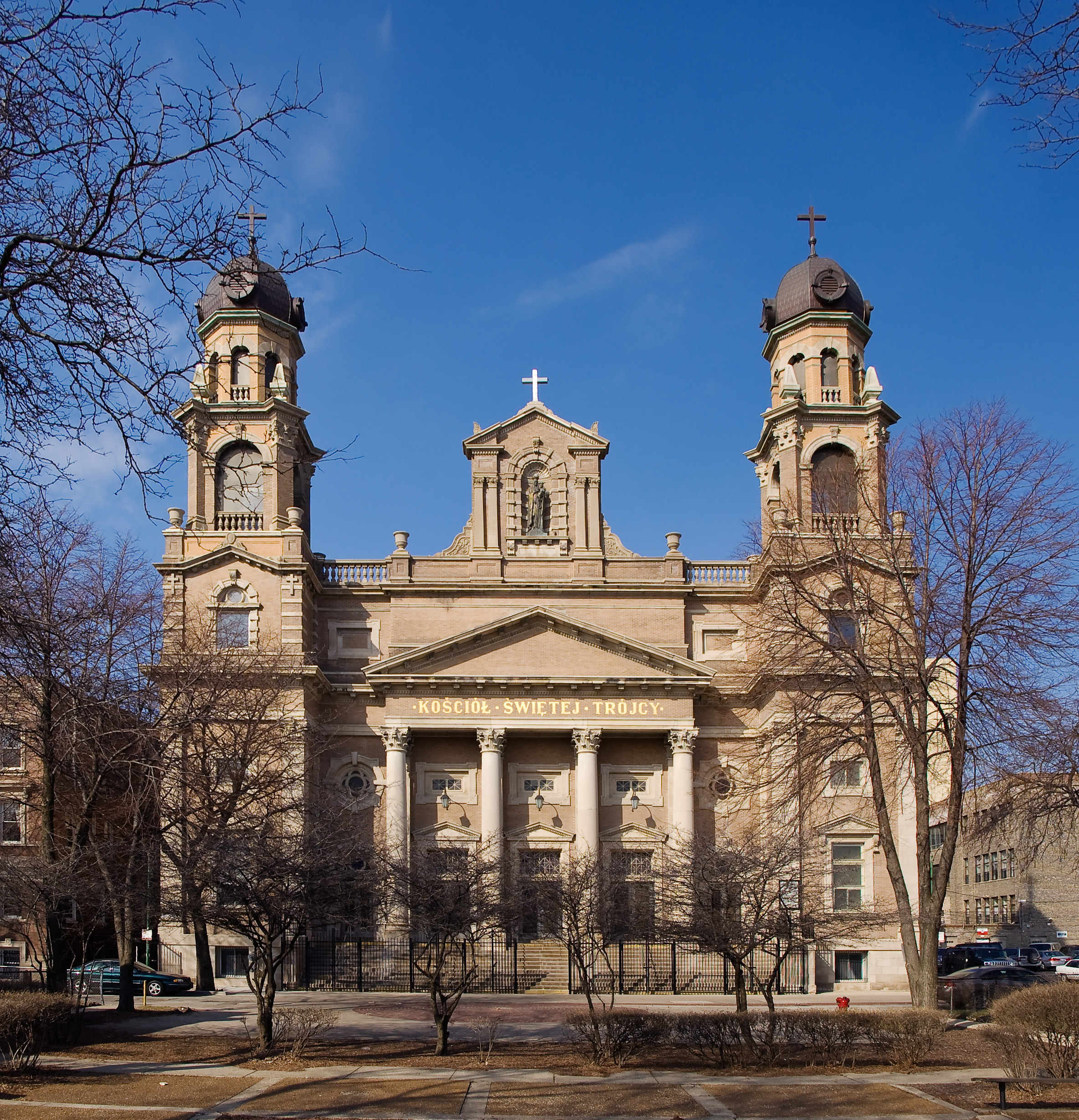
Holy Trinity Church, Chicago, Illinois

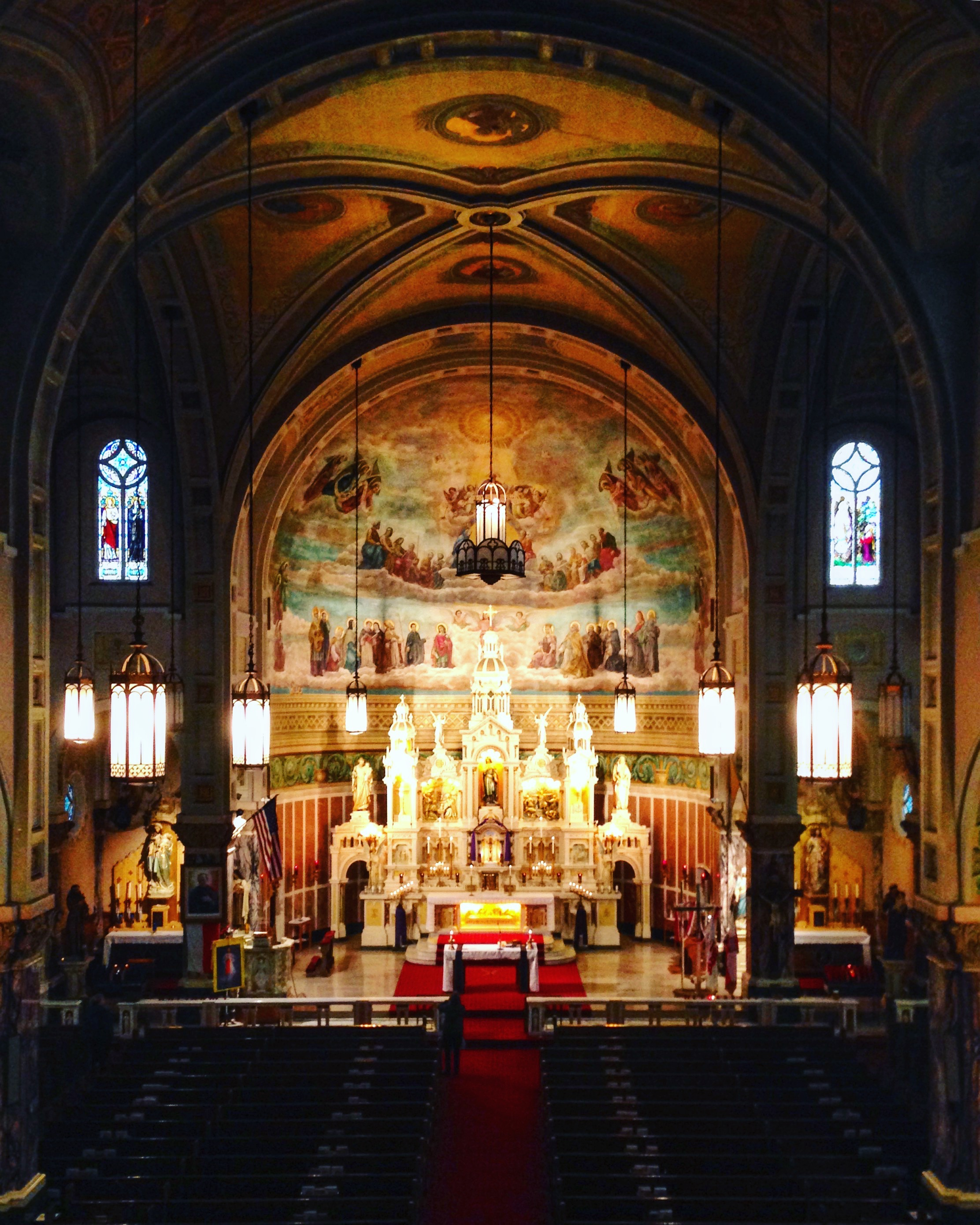
The altar, side altars, and nave of St. Casimir Church in Cleveland, Ohio, on March 13, 2016, following Cleveland Mass Mob XX

The Polish cathedral architectural style is a North American genre of Catholic church architecture found throughout the Great Lakes and Middle Atlantic regions as well as in parts of New England. These monumentally grand churches are not necessarily cathedrals, defined as seats of bishops or of their dioceses.

Polish cathedral churches generally have large amounts of ornamentation in the exterior and interior, comparable only to the more famous Churrigueresque or Spanish Baroque style. The decorations used reflect the tastes of the Polish immigrants to these regions in both the symbols and statuary of saints prominently displayed throughout. Additionally there is a heavy proclivity towards ornamentation drawn from the Renaissance and Baroque periods as well as modeling designs after famous churches in Poland. The claim of different 'architectural styles' of Europe ascribed to these churches is misleading, as most of them are already labeled by art historians as examples of Eclecticism and Historicism, characterized by the various architectural revivals found in styles of the late 19th and early 20th centuries. These churches exhibit a mixture of architectural traits from numerous past eras characteristic of Europe and the Americas.

== A unique synthesis ==
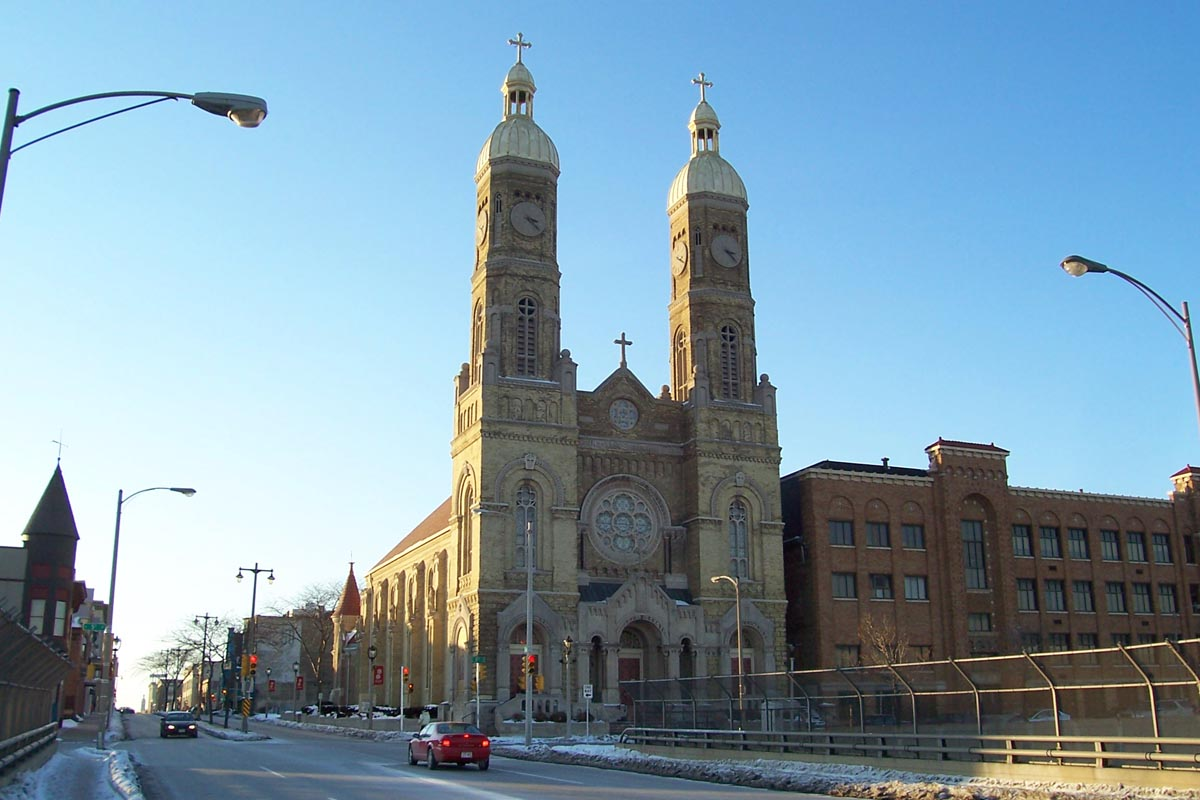
St. Stanislaus Catholic Church, Milwaukee, Wisconsin

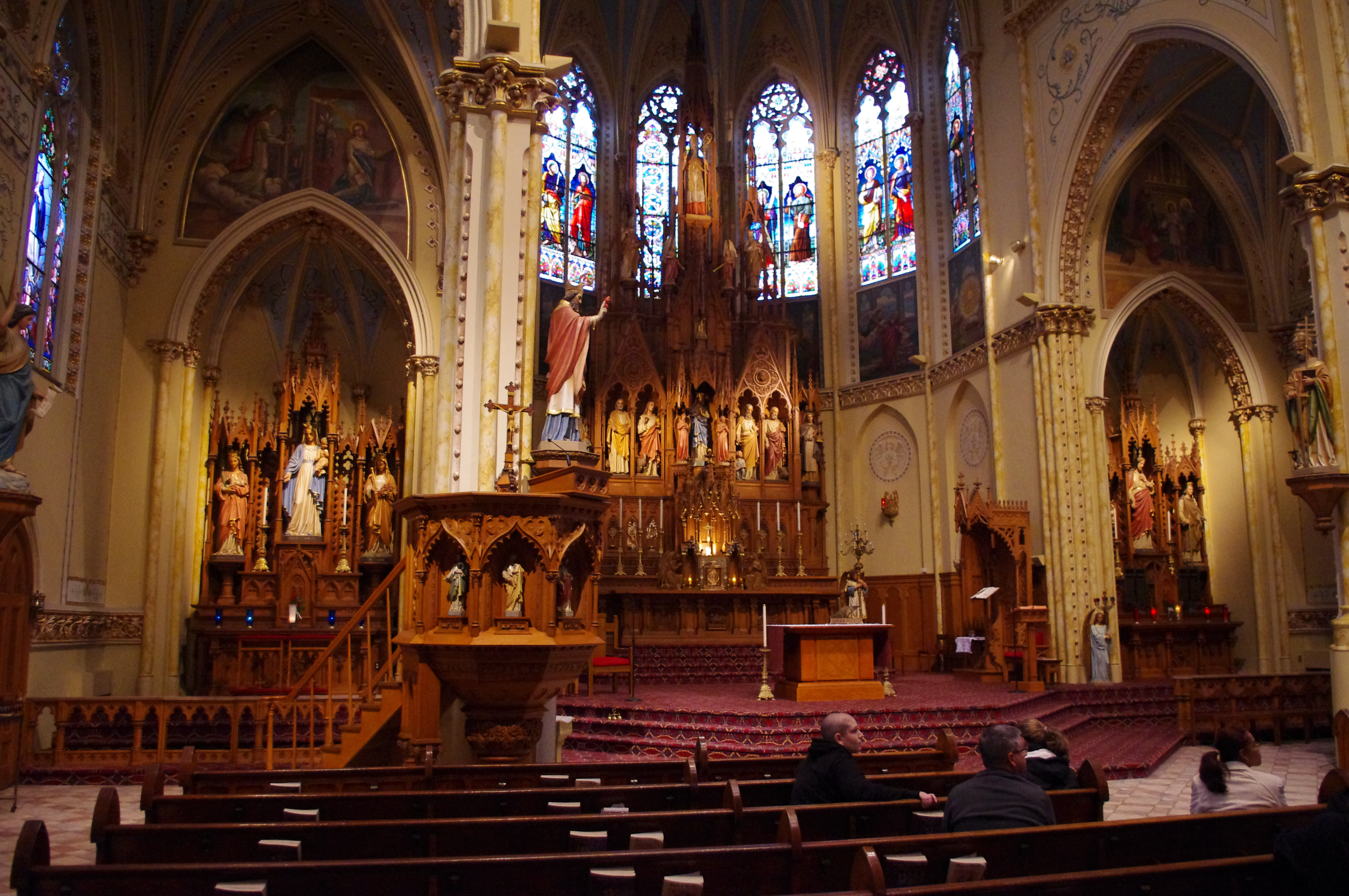
The main and side altars of the Shrine Church of St. Stanislaus Cleveland, Ohio

Skerrett says Polish churches surpassed other immigrants' churches in size. Their style promoted the immigrants' vision of Polish identity.

Kantowicz writes in The Archdiocese of Chicago: A Journey of Faith: "The preference of the Polish League for Renaissance and Baroque forms seems more clear cut. The glory days of the Polish Commonwealth came in the sixteenth and seventeenth centuries when it formed the largest state in Europe… The architectural style of Chicago's Polish churches in Chicago reflect this, particularly the magnificent edifices of Worthmann and Steinbach built along Milwaukee Avenue on the Northwest Side, reflected the renaissance glory of Polish Catholicism".

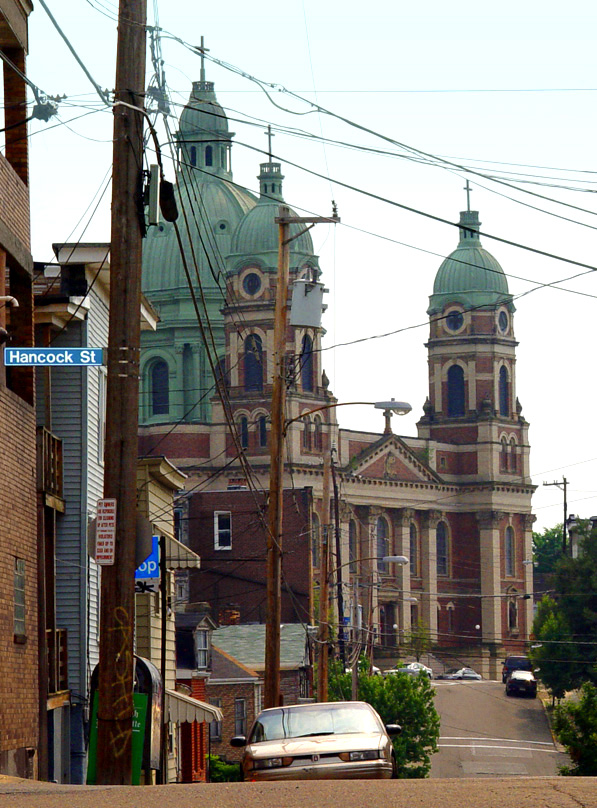
Immaculate Heart of Mary Church on Polish Hill in Pittsburgh

Peter Williams in his book Houses of God: Region, Religion, and Architecture in the United States on p. 179 writes:

[I]n Detroit and Chicago especially, a distinctive genre of church building emerged among Polish communities, the "Polish cathedral." Where most Catholic churches were built in grander or humbler variations and Gothic and Romanesque themes popular across the country, the ambitious prelates in the Great Lakes Polonias often chose to make monumental statements in the Renaissance style of their mother country. The scale of these structures was often enormous, both in the great size of these parishes and the episcopal ambitions of their clerical leaders... Still visible from the freeways, many of these "cathedrals" such as St. Stanislaus Kostka in Chicago now serve African-American or Latino constituencies while others have been closed by their archbishops as no longer economically viable.

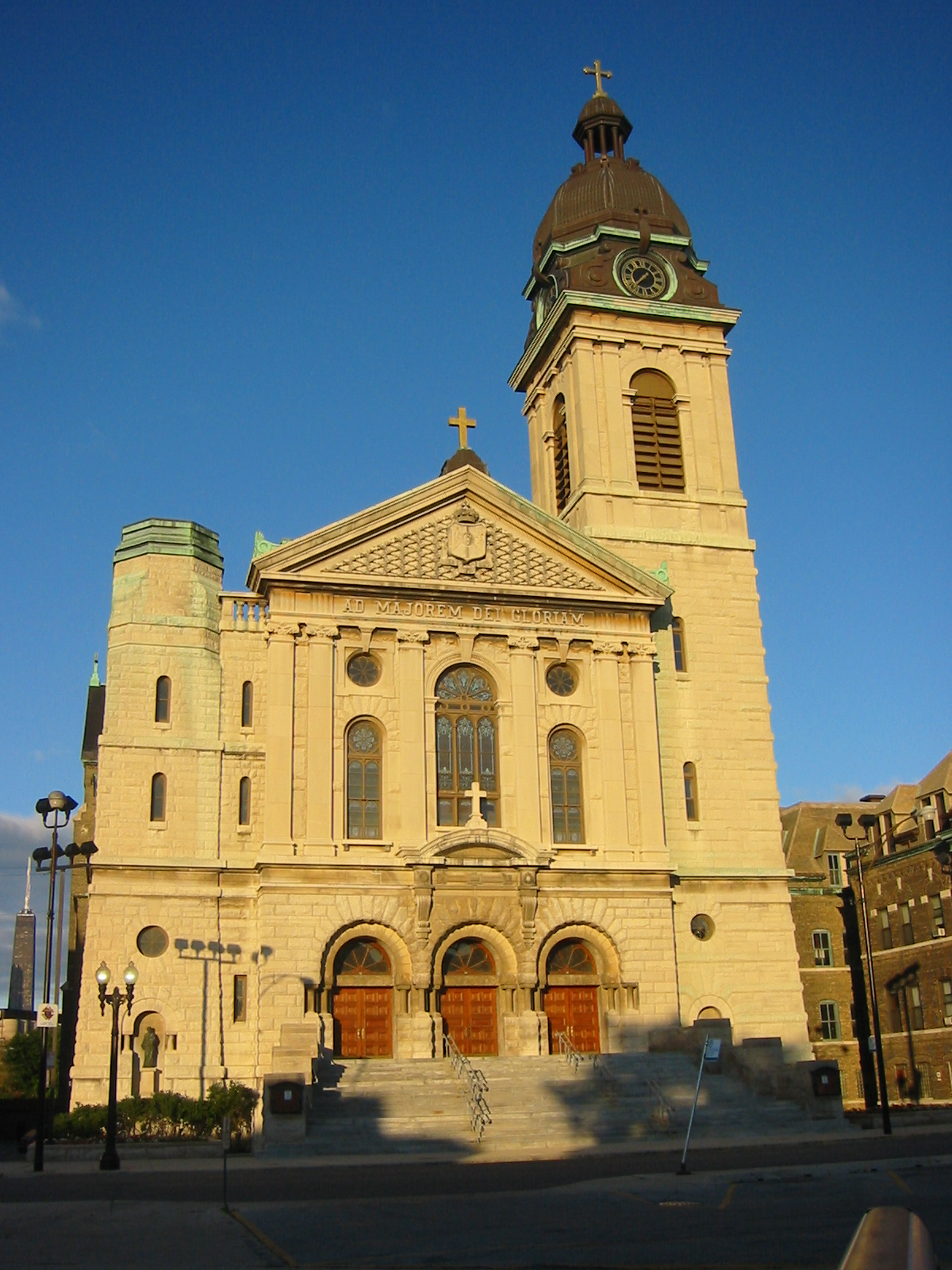
St. John Cantius Roman Catholic Church, Chicago, Illinois

The churches are major tourist attractions in Chicago, with tours devoted exclusively to them. In May 1980 the Chicago Architecture Foundation's ArchiCenter held an exhibit on these treasures titled Chicago's Polish Churches.

These ornate temples were largely built by the working poor in these regions in the era spanning the period from the end of the American Civil War until the end of World War II.

== Criticism ==
Many of Chicago's Protestant elites criticized these stylistically grand churches as "ostentatious" in comparison with the "plainer" style in vogue for Protestant houses of worship. Catholic hierarchs, such as John Lancaster Spalding, the first Bishop of Peoria, responded by comparing the churches that the immigrants financed to the pyramids of Egypt that were built by slaves.

The need for identity was evident in the unique architecture of the Polish cathedral style. It was often associated with the religious order of the Congregation of the Resurrection, in addition to the architectural styles of the Renaissance and Baroque periods. Both in scale and scope, these edifices were attempts to contradict the marginal status of Polish immigrants in society. As a stateless people whose culture was systematically attacked in its homeland during the years of partition, they also had a low economic rank in the industrial centers to which they had immigrated at the turn of the century. The construction of these churches greatly influenced the development of neighborhoods that surrounded them. World views that the Polish immigrants from the Old World retained, and their creative assimilation into the New World, shaped the landscape of the rapidly growing industrial regions to which they immigrated.

== List of churches built in the Polish cathedral style ==
Churches in the Polish cathedral style in the city of Chicago, Illinois
| Church | Location | Dominant architectural theme |
|---|---|---|
| 1. Church of St. Adalbert | Lower West Side | Neoclassical |
| 2. Church of St. Barbara | Bridgeport | Renaissance |
| 3. Covenant Presbyterian Church of Chicago (formerly All Saints Polish National Catholic Cathedral) | Bucktown | Gothic |
| 4. Church of St. Hedwig | Bucktown | Renaissance Revival |
| 5. Church of the Holy Innocents | West Town | Romanesque with Byzantine flourishes |
| 6. Church of the Holy Trinity | West Town | Renaissance |
| 7. Basilica of St. Hyacinth | Avondale | Renaissance |
| 8. Church of the Immaculate Conception | South Chicago | Renaissance |
| 9. Church of Our Lady of Tepeyac (formerly Church of St. Casimir) | Lower West Side | Baroque |
| 10. Church of St. John Cantius | West Town | Baroque |
| 11. Church of St. John of God (closed in 1992; demolished 2011) | Back of the Yards | Baroque |
| 12. Church of St. Joseph (Shrine) | Back of the Yards | Baroque |
| 13. Church of St. Josaphat | Lincoln Park | Romanesque |
| 14. Church of St. Mary of the Angels | Bucktown | Neoclassical |
| 15. Church of St. Mary of Perpetual Help | Bridgeport | Romanesque-Byzantine |
| 16. Church of St. Michael the Archangel | South Chicago | Gothic |
| 17. Salem Baptist Church of Chicago (formerly Church of St. Salomea) | West Pullman | Gothic |
| 18. Church of St. Stanislaus Kostka | West Town | Renaissance |
Churches in the Polish cathedral style in the suburbs of the city of Chicago
| Church | Location | Dominant architectural theme |
| 1. Church of St. Andrew | Calumet City | Renaissance |
| 2. Church of Sts. Cyril and Methodius | Lemont | Renaissance |
| 3. Church of St. Mary of Częstochowa | Cicero | Gothic |
Outside Chicago
Churches in the Polish cathedral style in Detroit, Michigan
| Church | Location | Dominant architectural theme |
| 1. Church of Our Lady of Mount Carmel | Wyandotte | Renaissance |
| 2. Church of St. Florian | Hamtramck | Gothic |
| 3. Church of St. Stanislaus, Bishop and Martyr (closed in 1989) | East Side | Romanesque |
| 4. The Polish-American Historical Site Association (formerly Church of St. Albertus) | East Side, Canfield Avenue | Gothic Revival |
| 5. Church of the Sweetest Heart of Mary | East Side, Canfield Avenue | Gothic Revival |
| 6. Church of St. Francis of Assisi | Southwest Side | Italian Renaissance |
| 7. Church of St. Hyacinth | East Side | Byzantine Romanesque |
| 8. Church of St. Hedwig | Southwest Side | |
| 9. Church of St. Casimir (demolished in 1967; the twin of the Church of St. Mary of Perpetual Help in Chicago, Illinois) | Southwest Side | Romanesque Byzantine |
| 10. Church of St. John Cantius (closed in 2009) | Delray | Romanesque |
| 11. Church of St. Josaphat | East Side, Canfield Avenue | Romanesque and Gothic Revival |
Churches in the Polish cathedral style in Grand Rapids, Michigan
| Church | Location | Dominant architectural theme |
| 1. Basilica of St. Adalbert | Grand Rapids | Romanesque with Byzantine influence |
Churches in the Polish cathedral style in Bay City, Michigan
| Church | Location | Dominant architectural theme |
| 1. Church of St. Stanislaus Kostka | South side | Gothic Revival |
Churches in the Polish cathedral style in Cleveland, Ohio
| Church | Location | Dominant architectural theme |
| 1. Shrine Church of St. Stanislaus | Slavic Village | Gothic architecture |
| 2. Church of St. Casimir | St. Clair-Superior | Romanesque |
| 3. Church of St. John Cantius | Tremont | Baroque and Art Deco |
Churches in the Polish cathedral style in Milwaukee, Wisconsin
| Church | Location | Dominant architectural theme |
| 1. Church of St. Stanislaus | South Side | Renaissance |
| 2. Church of St. Adalbert | South Side | Romanesque Revival |
| 3. Basilica of St. Josaphat | South Side | Baroque |
| 4. Church of St. Casimir | Riverwest | Baroque |
| 5. Church of St. Vincent de Paul | South Side | Romanesque |
| 6. Church of St. Hedwig | South Side | Romanesque, Gothic |
Churches in the Polish cathedral style in Pittsburgh, Pennsylvania
| Church | Location | Dominant architectural theme |
| 1. Church of St. Stanislaus Kostka | Strip District | Romanesque |
| 2. Church of the Immaculate Heart of Mary | Polish Hill | Baroque |
Churches in the Polish cathedral style in Philadelphia, Pennsylvania
| Church | Location | Dominant architectural theme |
| 1. Church of St. John Cantius | Bridesburg | Gothic |
| 2. Church of St. Adalbert | Port Richmond | Gothic |
| 3. Church of St. Laurentius | Fishtown | Gothic |
Churches in the Polish cathedral style in Winona, Minnesota
| Church | Location | Dominant architectural theme |
| 1. Basilica of Saint Stanislaus Kostka | Downtown | Romanesque |
Churches in the Polish cathedral style in Western Massachusetts
| Church | Location | Dominant architectural theme |
| 1. Basilica of St. Stanislaus | Chicopee Center (Cabotville) | Baroque Revival |
| 2. St. Stanislaus Kostka Church | Adams | Gothic Revival |
Churches in the Polish cathedral style in Buffalo, New York
| Church | Location | Dominant architectural theme |
| 1. Church of St. Stanislaus, Bishop and Martyr | East Side | Romanesque Revival |
| 2. Basilica of St. Adalbert | East Side | Romanesque Revival |
| 3. Church of the Corpus Christi | East Side | Romanesque Revival |
| 4. Church of the Assumption of St. Mary | Black Rock | Gothic |
Churches in the Polish cathedral style in Syracuse, New York
| Church | Location | Dominant architectural theme |
| 1. Basilica of the Sacred Heart of Jesus | Westside | Gothic Revival |
Churches in the Polish cathedral style in Baltimore, Maryland
| Church | Location | Dominant architectural theme |
| 1.Church of the Holy Rosary | Upper Fells Point | Romanesque |
| 2.Church of St. Casimir | Canton | Romanesque |
Churches in the Polish cathedral style in Connecticut
| Church | Location | Dominant architectural theme |
| 1. Church of St. Stanislaus | Upper State Street Historic District, New Haven | Baroque |
| 2. Sacred Heart Parish | New Britain | Gothic Revival |
Churches in the Polish cathedral style in Delaware
| Church | Location | Dominant architectural theme |
| 1. St. Hedwig's Roman Catholic Church | Wilmington, Delaware | Gothic Revival |

== See also ==
- Eclecticism
- Eclecticism in art
- Jozef Mazur, Polish-American painter and stained-glass artist
- Tadeusz Żukotyński, Polish Catholic fine art painter and mural artist
- Sr. Maria Stanisia, Polish-American fine art painter and restoration artist
- Czesław Dźwigaj, Polish Catholic artist and sculptor
- Holy Cross in Chicago, an ornately decorated church founded by Lithuanians in Chicago's Back of the Yards, which displays architectural affinities with the architecture of Polish cathedrals.
- Polish Americans
- Poles in Chicago
- Polish Roman Catholic Union of America
- Roman Catholicism in Poland
