= John A. Mallin =

American painter

John A. Mallin (was born Johann Malinkowitsch; April 14, 1883 — January 9, 1973) was a Czech-American mural and fresco painter in the Chicago area in the 20th century. He painted many church interiors for the Archdiocese of Chicago, often working after the architect and builder Henry J. Schlacks completed the structure of a church.

== Biography ==
Mallin was born Johann Malinkowitsch on April 14, 1883 in the town of Bischofwart (now Hlohovec) in what was then Lower Austria, and is now the Czech Republic. His parents both came from families of vintners. At the age of fifteen, he became an apprentice at the School of the Interior and Decorative Painters Guild in Vienna. Johann was apprenticed to a series of master trainers in the painter's trade from April 1, 1898 until April 1, 1902. Until 1906, he continued to live and work near his home as a painter's assistant with a number of employers, some of whom were his former master instructors. His work ledger indicates a high level of satisfaction with his performance and demeanor. He was often let go "because of lack of available work." In search of a more secure future, he shortened his name to Mallin and came to the United States in 1907.

He settled in Chicago. One of his first jobs was as a decorator of façades for the Riverview Amusement Park in Chicago. In 1918, he formed his own decorating company, John A. Mallin, Interior Art Decorations. He specialized in church decoration and ecclesiastical painting as well as art glass and mosaics. He stated his philosophy in one of his commercial brochures: "As there is nothing too good for God, so there is nothing too rich or too precious for God's earthly homes, His churches..."

He originally worked out of his home, but in 1920 opened a studio in the Fine Arts Building at 410 S. Michigan Avenue in the Chicago Landmark Historic Michigan Boulevard District. His business flourished. In one of his brochures, he lists over 50 churches as references, most in Chicago, but some in Indiana, Michigan, Iowa and Tennessee. Eventually, he moved his studio to 2252 W. Devon Avenue. His son joined the studio and specialized in gold leaf applications. He decorated more than 100 churches in his lifetime.

He died on January 9, 1973, at the age of 89. He has a crypt in the crematorium at the Bohemian National Cemetery, which still has his decorations from the 1920s.

== Churches with John A. Mallin Art ==
- St. Adalbert Parish, South Bend
- St. Vincent de Paul Church (Chicago)
- St. Mary of the Angels (Chicago)
- St. Jerome Roman Catholic Church, (Rogers Park) Chicago
