= St. Stanislaus Kostka Church (Chicago) =

Coordinates: 41°54′21.4″N 87°39′44.7″W

Saint Stanislaus Kostka Catholic Church
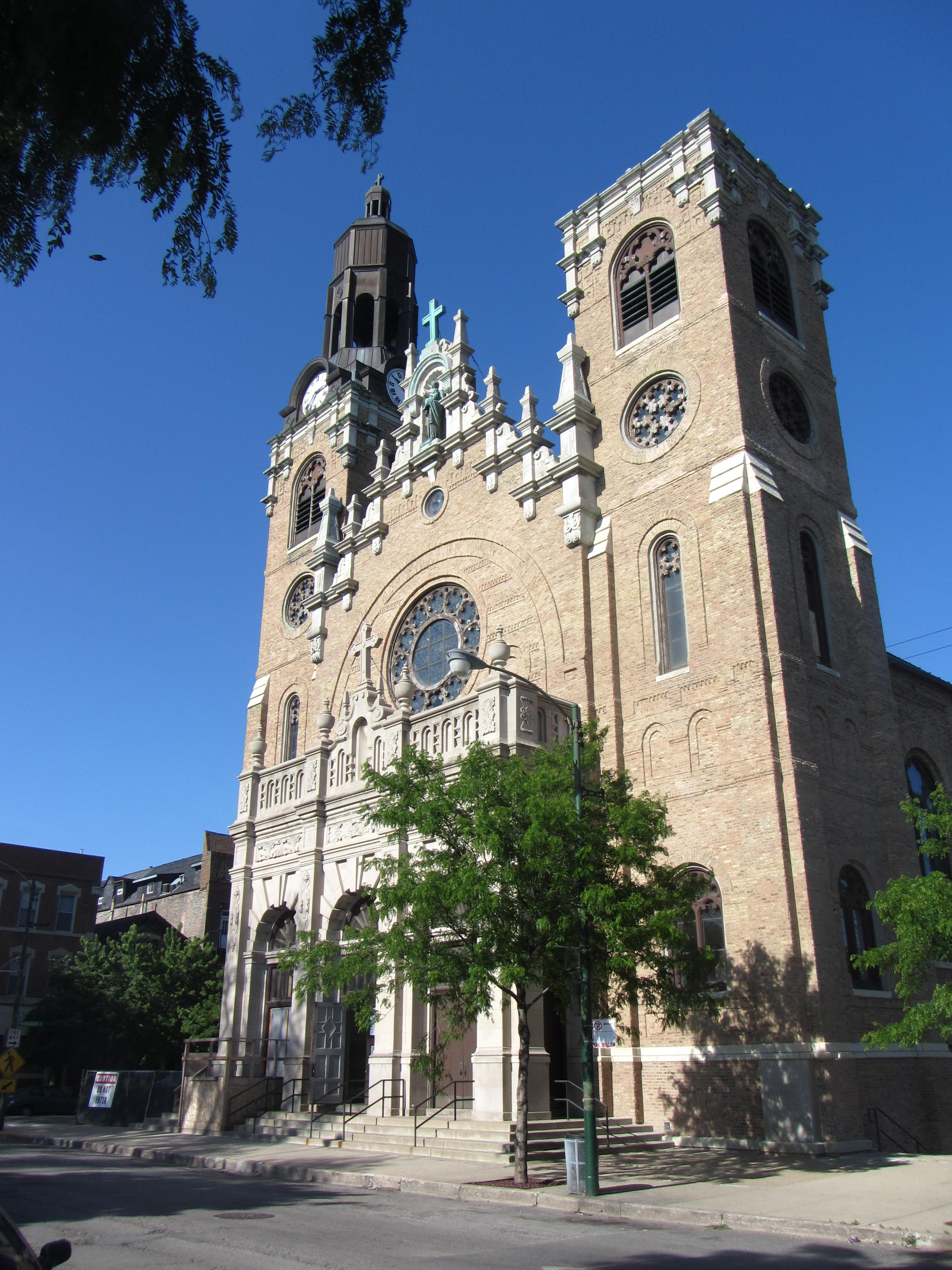

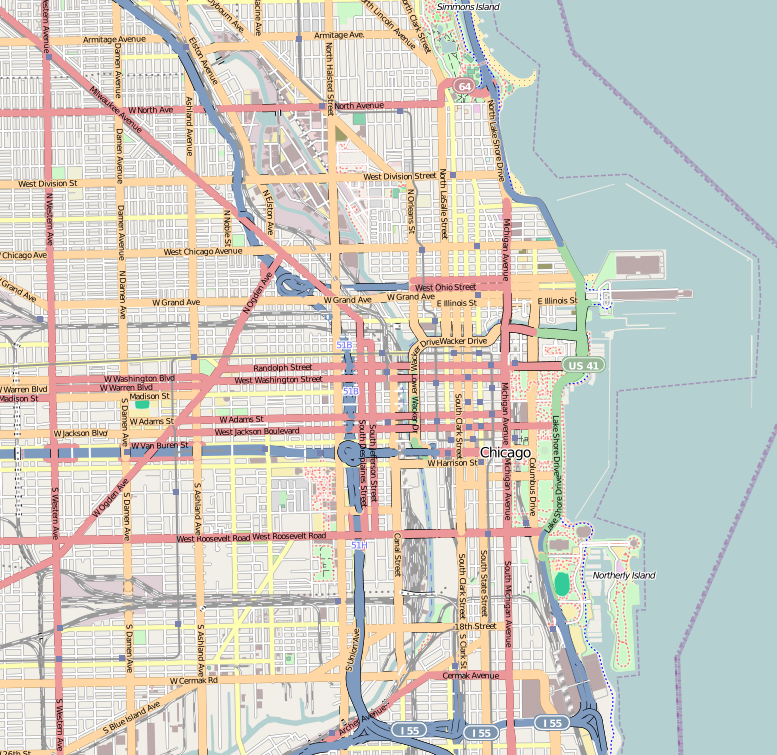
- Location within Central Chicago
- Location: Chicago, Illinois
- Country: United States
- Denomination: Roman Catholic Church
- Website: ststanschurch.org

History
- Status: Church
- Founded: 1867
- Founder: Polish immigrants
- Dedication: St. Stanislaus Kostka
- Dedicated: June 18, 1871; Present church: July 10, 1881

Architecture
- Functional status: Active
- Heritage designation: For Polish immigrants
- Architect: Patrick Keely
- Architectural type: Church
- Style: Polish Cathedral style
- Groundbreaking: July 1, 1877 - present church
- Completed: July 10, 1881 - present church

Specifications
- Capacity: 1,500
- Length: 200
- Width: 80
- Materials: Brick

Saint Stanislaus Kostka Catholic Church (Polish: Kościół Świętego Stanisława Kostki) is a historic Polish church of the Roman Catholic Archdiocese of Chicago that is located at 1351 West Evergreen Avenue in the Pulaski Park neighborhood of Chicago, Illinois, United States. It is designated as the Sanctuary of Divine Mercy of the Archdiocese.

The Church is the "mother church" of all Polish churches in the Archdiocese of Chicago. Since 1999 the church has been open 24 hours, 7 days per week for Adoration, and it hosts the Exposition of the Blessed Sacrament at all times except during the celebration of Holy Mass.

It is a prime example of the Polish Cathedral style of churches in both its opulence and grand scale. With the Basilica of St. Hyacinth, St. Mary of the Angels Church, St. John Cantius, and St. Hedwig Church it is one of many monumental Polish churches visible from the Kennedy Expressway that runs through Chicago.

== History ==
Saint Stanislaus Kostka Catholic Church was founded in 1867 as the first Polish parish in Chicago. Because the Resurrectionist Order has administered the parish since 1869 and later founded many other Polish parishes in the City, Saint Stanislaus Kostka is often denominated the "mother church" of Chicago's Polish community. Antoni Smagorzewski-Schermann, the first permanent Polish resident of Chicago, was one of the prominent founders of the Church and was named its first president. Smagorzewski-Schermann also donated some of his land for the site of the Church.

The original church edifice survived the Great Chicago Fire but was demolished to construct the present church. The famous Irish Roman Catholic ecclesiastical architect Patrick Charles Keely of Brooklyn, New York, New York, built the present church that is located on the southeast corner of Noble and Evergreen Streets from 1871 to 1881. At the end of the 19th century, it was one of the largest parishes not only in the City but in the whole nation, with more than 35,000 parishioners in 1908.

Along with Holy Trinity Polish Mission, Saint Stanislaus Kostka was the center of Chicago's Polish Downtown, which once caused its formerly to be nicknamed "Kostkaville". Much of this was due to the Church's first pastor, Reverend Vincent Michael Barzynski, who was described as "one of the greatest organizers of Polish immigrants in Chicago and America". Barzynski was responsible, in various ways, for founding 23 Polish parishes in Chicago, 6 elementary schools, 2 high schools, one college, orphanages, newspapers, Saint Mary of Nazareth Hospital, and the national headquarters of the Polish Roman Catholic Union of America.

As a cultural node for Chicago's Polish Community, the church has hosted governmental officials from Poland and the United States, including President Woodrow Wilson and Małgorzata Gosiewska.

The Church lost one of its 2 belfries that were "so reminiscent of Kraków or Łódź[,] from a lightning strike in 1970". The Church was to be demolished to construct the Kennedy Expressway, yet intense effort of Chicago Polonia in the late 1950s resulted in shifting the planned right of way east thus rendering demolition unnecessary. The Church remained predominately Polish through most of the 20th century, but since the 1970s, it has gained a significant number of Latino parishioners. Masses are celebrated in English, Polish, and Spanish.

== Architecture ==
The church was completed in 1881 and designed by Patrick Keely of Brooklyn, also architect of Chicago's Holy Name Cathedral. The building's Renaissance Revival style recalls the glory days of the Polish–Lithuanian Commonwealth in the 16th century. It is constructed of yellow brick with limestone accents with interior measurements of 200 ft (61 m) in length and 80 ft (24 m) in width, allowing seating for 1500. The painting above the altar by Tadeusz Żukotyński depicts Our Lady placing the infant Jesus in the arms of St. Stanislaus Kostka. Żukotyński, who came to Chicago in 1888, was considered one of Europe's foremost painters of religious subjects. Other artistic treasures in the church include the Stained glass windows by F.X. Zettler of the Royal Bavarian Institute in Munich and the chandeliers in the nave by the studios of Louis Comfort Tiffany. The southern cupola was destroyed by lightning in 1964, and the northern cupola was rebuilt with a more simplified profile in 2002.

In addition to the church, the two-block physical plant of the Saint Stanislaus Kostka Parish complex contained a large performance hall, a convent and rectory, a gymnasium and a two-year commercial school for girls, staffed by the School Sisters of Notre Dame. In 1906, a fire destroyed the school and convent, as well as an auditorium that was under construction. Two years later, the school had been rebuilt with 54 classrooms and three meeting halls, making it the largest elementary school in all of the United States when it opened in 1908. The complex also includes a modernist-style 1959 school building designed by Belli & Belli of Chicago.

St. Stanislaus Kostka is the future home of the planned Sanctuary of The Divine Mercy. The sanctuary will have an adoration chapel and outdoor prayer garden enclosed by a surrounding wall of stone to help define the space as sacred. Within the enclosure, there will be no liturgies or vocal prayers, either by individuals or groups. The space is strictly meant for private meditation and contemplation. Various religious iconography will be found in the Sanctuary of The Divine Mercy. At the heart of the chapel will be the Iconic Monstrance of Our Lady of the Sign which will be the focus of 24-hour Eucharistic adoration. The new sanctuary is designed by McCrery Architects of Washington, D.C.

In September 2011, the parish began a fundraising campaign to complete needed repairs. The work will correct structural deficiencies, repair pews, restore decorative paintings and glass, install flooring and upgrade electrical and sound systems and will be completed in phases. The total budget is expected to cost $4.4 million.

== See also ==
- Peter Kiołbassa (1837-1905) Polonia activist and Democratic politician in the City of Chicago who helped organize St. Stanislaus Kostka Parish
- Jozef Mazur (1897–1970), Polish-American painter and stained glass artist
- Sr. Maria Stanisia (1878–1967), Polish-American fine art painter and restoration artist
- Casimir Zeglen (1869–1910), Polish-American priest at St. Stanislaus Kostka who invented the first bulletproof vest
- Poles in Chicago
- Polish Americans
- Roman Catholicism in Poland
