= Mary Stanisia =

American artist (1878–1967)

Sister Mary Stanisia, SSND, (May 4, 1878 – January 28, 1967) was an American Catholic nun, artist, and painter, member of the School Sisters of Notre Dame.

== Early life ==
Monika Kurkowska was born on May 4, 1878, in Poland. She was one of twelve children brought to the United States in 1881 on board the liner, Strassburg, by her parents Franciszek, a wood carver, and Katarzyna Kurkowski. They changed their surname to "Kurk" after arriving in the United States. They were originally from the German partition of Poland. The family became members of the St. Stanislaus Polish parish where Monika attended its elementary school. She went on to the Academy of Our Lady before she left home to study with count Tadeusz Żukotyński in Munich. Żukotyński, an artist born in Poland, taught Stanisia to paint religious art, including murals.

== Early career ==
She returned to the United States in 1893 and three years later, following a religious calling she had felt since she was a young girl, she moved to Milwaukee, Wisconsin and entered the School Sisters of Notre Dame under a new religious name, Mary Stanisia. She spent the next three years in the novitiate of the religious congregation. In March 1899, Sister Mary Stanisia took her Final vows at St. Mary's in Michigan City, Indiana. In the same year she painted The Sacred Heart of Jesus, her first known painting.

Stanisia taught art at Our Lady of Lourdes Academy in Marinette, Wisconsin, and gave private art lessons beginning that fall. She taught there until 1905, when she was assigned to St. Mary's Academy in Prairie du Chien, Wisconsin, where she spent the next two years. In 1907, Sister Stanisia was assigned to the Academy of Our Lady in Chicago, where she had studied as a girl. She established an art studio, large enough to create murals, and became director of the school's Fine Arts program.

== Further training ==
Beginning in 1916, Stanisia continued her artistic studies at the School of the Art Institute of Chicago (SAIC). She studied murals with John W. Norton, landscape with Frank Charles Peyraud, figure painting with Wellington J. Reynolds, and portraiture with Leopold Seyffert. Albin Polasek taught her sculpture. Stanisia graduated with a Bachelor of Fine Arts degree in 1919, having exhibited in each of the school's annual shows. The 1917-1918 SAIC catalog was illustrated with her painting, Her Great Grandmother's Wedding Gown. Stanisia studied under Robert Clarkson between 1915 and 1922 and studied in Provincetown, Massachusetts, one summer with Charles Webster Hawthorne.

While Stanisia was studying art, she was also pursuing her education in philosophy. She graduated from DePaul University in 1922 with a Bachelor of Philosophy degree.

== Career ==
As a mature artist Stanisia painted commissions for portraits, murals, and religious-themed works. She painted a large central panel for an altarpiece at the Basilica of St. Hyacinth, based upon a work designed by Zukotynski there. It is perhaps the earliest large panel of her career. She also did works for the Churches of St. Stanislaus Kostka and Holy Cross in Chicago, which are built in the so-called Polish Cathedral style.

In 1926, she exhibited four paintings at the Eucharistic Congress in Chicago, which was held to promote of Catholic Eucharistic art. The exposure resulted a significant increase in commissions. Around 1926 Stanisia completed a Stations of the Cross cycle on the South Side of Chicago for St. Margaret of Scotland Church. She created about fifty works of art, including portraits and murals, over the next four years.

In 1929 she established an art department at Mount Mary College, part of her congregation in Milwaukee, while continuing to direct the program in Chicago. She established the Art Guild of Chicago the following year, based at Longwood.

Her paintings included, Portrait of Bishop John F. Noll, of the Roman Catholic Diocese of Fort Wayne-South Bend, St. Theresa, the Sacred Heart of Jesus. The American Art Society commissioned her to paint a portrait of Pope Pius XI, which hung at the former Holy Family Academy in Chicago. In 1934, she also painted a portrait of Edward Kelly, Mayor of Chicago, and in 1933 of Governor Horner of Illinois.

Stanisia was one of many nuns who were able to integrate their spiritual life with their artistic practice. This resulted in the creation of a purely American Catholic art, with its own icons and style.

Her work was exhibited in 1925 at the Eucharistic Congress. In 1930, her work was exhibited at the Gallery of Wisconsin Art held by The Milwaukee Journal. She won a silver medal at The Warsaw International Fair of 1932. In 1935, her work was shown in Evanston, Illinois at the Davis Galleries.

== Death ==
She died on January 28, 1967, in Elm Grove, Wisconsin, after a brief spell in the Notre Dame Infirmary.

== Collections ==
- Adrian College, Michigan
- Holy Cross Church, Chicago
- St. Joseph's Hospital, Chicago
- St. Margaret's Church, Chicago
- St. Paul Cathedral, Minnesota
- College of Cardinals, Washington, D.C.

== See also ==
- Jozef Mazur
- Polish Americans
- Polish Roman Catholic Union of America
- Polish Cathedral style
- Roman Catholicism in Poland
