= Tadeusz Żukotyński =

American painter

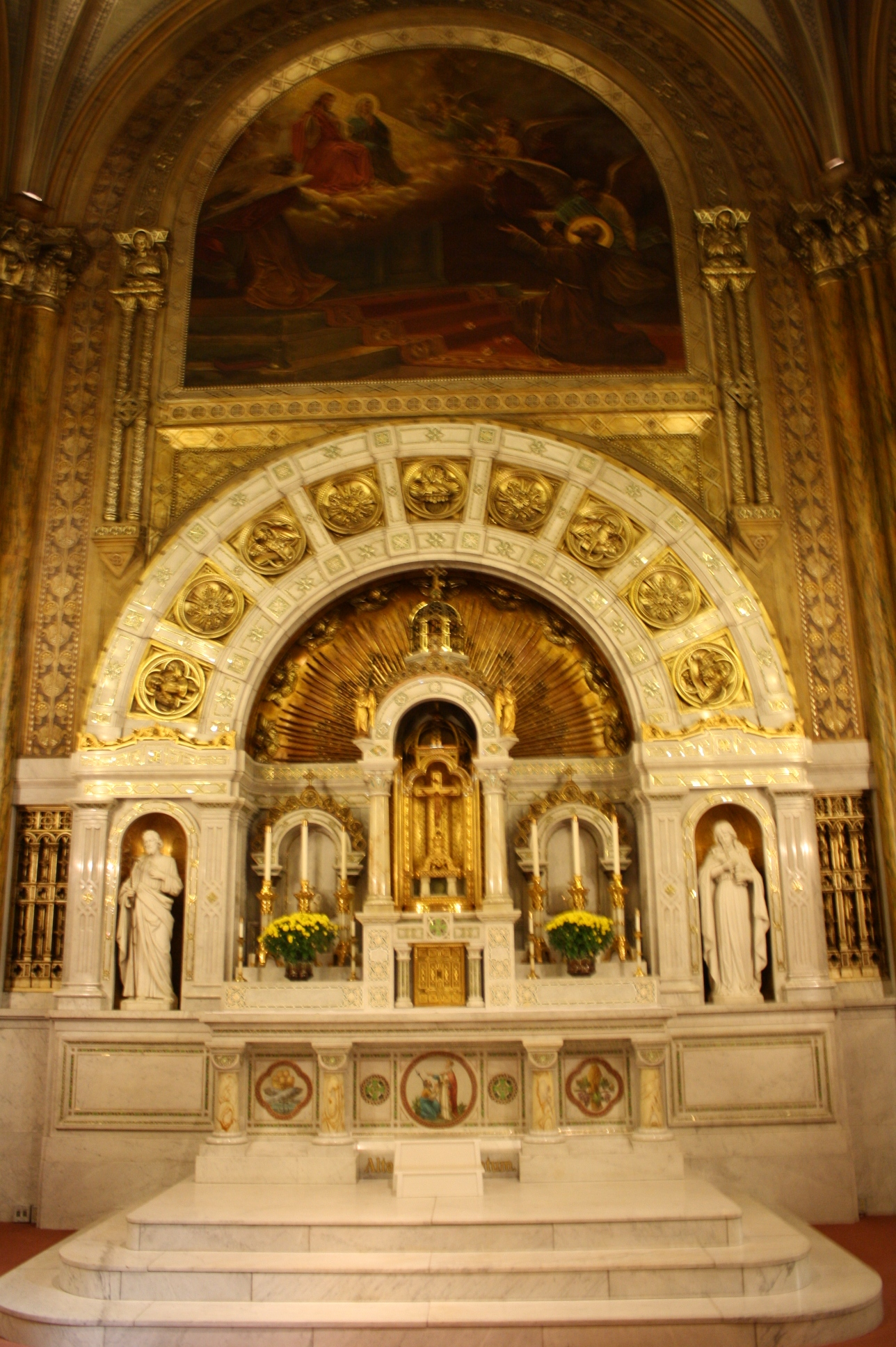
- Painting (top) inside the St. Rose of Viterbo Convent
- Born: 1855; Kamianets-Podilskyi, Russian Empire
- Died: 1912 (aged 56–57); Chicago
- Education: Academy of Arts, Munich, Germany
- Known for: painting

Tadeusz Żukotyński (April 3, 1855 – December 7, 1912) was a Polish count, professor, and painter.

== Early life ==
Born in what is today the region of Podolia in Ukraine, he was one of Europe's foremost painters in religious subjects. A pupil of Ksawery Pillati in Warsaw and a student of Cracow Academy of Fine Arts with Jan Matejko, Żukotyński studied since 1879 at the Academy of Fine Arts, Munich, where he was recognized with the highest prize awarded by the academy, a silver medal, as well as two bronze medals.

== Career ==
At the urging of his mother, he donated his first work, a small picture of the Blessed Virgin, to a poor church in Milwaukee. Shortly after he arrived in America, Żukotyński entered a church in Milwaukee and found his own Madonna in a place of honor. He opened a studio in Milwaukee at once, and went on to create more than 100 paintings and murals for churches around the United States, five of which hang above the altars in Mary of the Angels Chapel, with an additional three paintings in the Adoration Chapel.

His works can be found in other areas of Wisconsin, where Żukotyński painted the St. Francis of Assisi altar in the Maria Angelorum Chapel of the Franciscan Sisters of Perpetual Adoration at St. Rose of Viterbo Convent in La Crosse, Wisconsin. An oil-on-canvas painting located immediately above the altar in Mary of the Angels Chapel, it depicts St. Francis of Assisi, founder of the Franciscan Order, showing Francis at prayer in the Little Chapel of Portiuncula, surrounded by visions of Jesus, Mary and angelic hosts.

Żukotyński was said to walk out into the country to study scenery so his paintings would be in harmony with local nature. He also apparently relied heavily on prayer, and always had a light burning in front of a statue of the Blessed Virgin, to whom he attributed his success.

His beautiful murals and pictures adorn many Polish churches in Chicago and its vicinity. He came to Chicago in 1888 and settled there. Żukotyński's frescoes can be found in many of the ornate churches here built in the so-called Polish Cathedral style. Perhaps most well known is his large painting in the Sanctuary dome of St. Stanislaus Kostka Church which depicts the resurrected Christ accompanied by the saints in Heaven with a Latin inscription that reads: "I am the Resurrection and the Life. Alleluia. And on the third day He arose as He said. Alleluia." He also painted the altar pieces in St. John Cantius and at the Basilica of St. Hyacinth, the lunettes in St. Hedwig's, as well as the stations in Holy Cross church. The Polish Museum of America in Chicago also possesses a collection of his original drawings donated by Dr. Charles H. Wachtl

Żukotyński's work can also be found in the state of Indiana where his stations of the cross can be seen at St. Hedwig's in South Bend, Indiana, as well as his frescoes in the Church of the Immaculate Conception at Saint Mary-of-the-Woods, Indiana.

In 1901, Zukotynski painted 14 oil paintings in St. Mary's Church in St. Benedict, Kansas. In the nave are six oil paintings on canvas six by nine feet depicting scenes in the life of Mary, patroness of the church. In the transept are four round oil paintings on canvas six feet in diameter of the four major prophets. In the apse above the high altar are three oil paintings directly on the plaster wall depicting faith, hope, and love. Surmounting the high altar is an oil painting on canvas six by nine feet of the Assumption of Mary into Heaven. The artist's signature is on the painting to the left of the main altar. St. Mary's was named to the National Register of Historic Places in 1980.

== Death ==
Tadeusz Żukotyński died in 1912.

== Legacy ==
Żukotyński schooled the artist Sister Mary Stanisia, training her in such fields of art as religious and landscape painting, and sculpture, who later continued her studies at the Chicago Art Institute after his death. In 1920 Sister Stanisia, a teacher at the Academy of Our Lady, was commissioned to restore some of the precious frescoes of Zukotynski at St. Stanislaus Kostka, St. Hyacinth Basilica and Holy Cross churches in Chicago.
