= Polish Roman Catholic Union of America =

Fraternal benefit society for Polish Americans

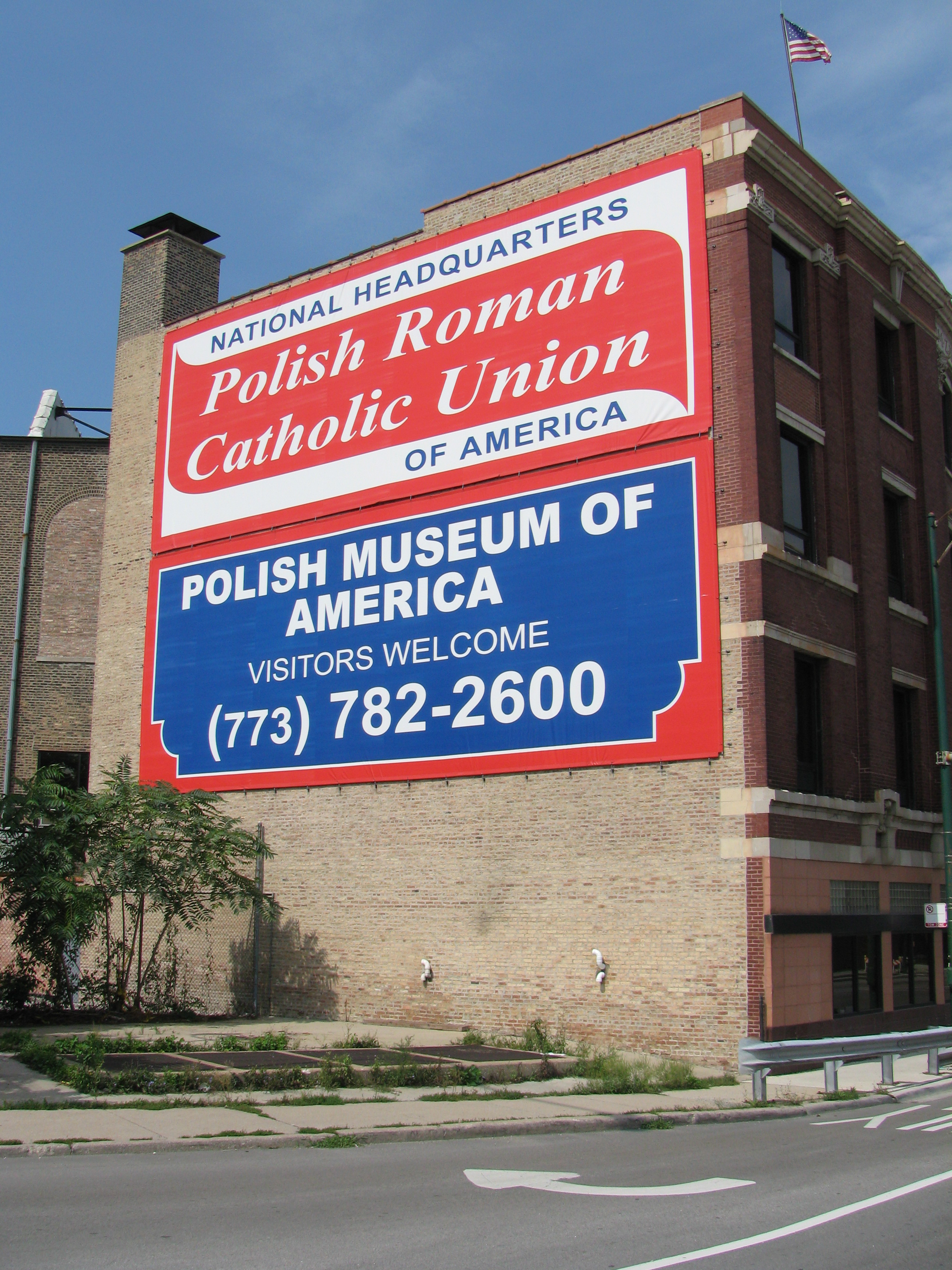
Polish Museum of America and Polish Roman Catholic Union of America signs that are visible to westbound travelers on the Kennedy Expressway.

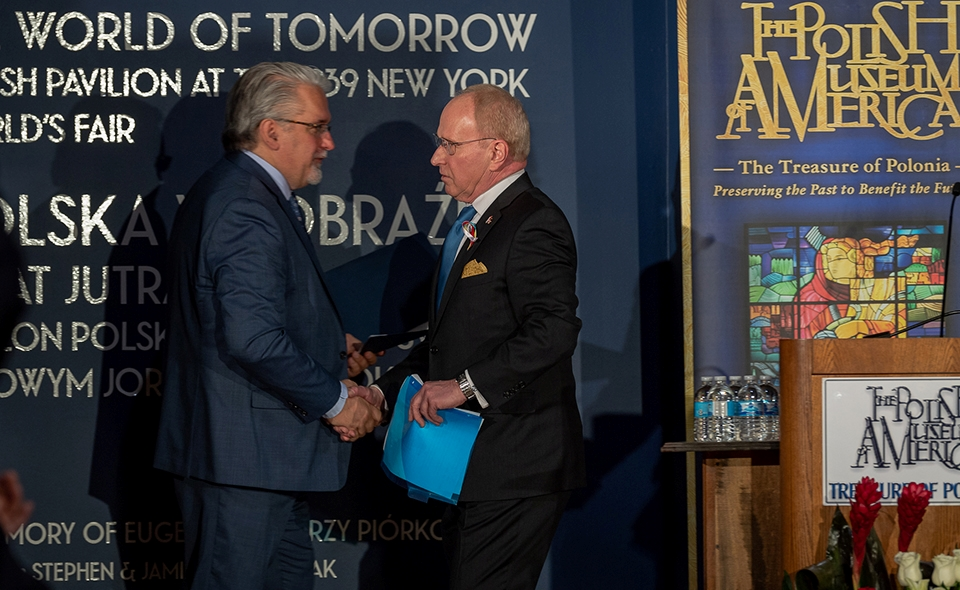
President of the PAC and PNA, Frank J. Spula (right), shaking hands with the President of the PRCUA, James J. Robaczewski (left), at the Pulaski Day Celebrations at the Polish Museum of America, March 7th 2022.

The Polish Roman Catholic Union of America (PRCUA) (in Polish: Zjednoczenie Polskie Rzymsko-Katolickie w Ameryce) is the oldest Polish American organization in the United States. Currently licensed to sell its products in 27 states, it is a fraternal benefit society providing financial security to its members through competitive life insurance and annuities, and offering opportunities for cultural, educational and spiritual growth.

== History ==
The Polish Roman Catholic Union of America traces its existence to 1873. In June of that year, Father Theodor Gieryk of Detroit wrote letters to Polish-language newspapers urging the creation of a Polish-American national organization. On October 3, 1873, a group of influential Polish Americans met and established the PRCUA. Among these founders were Father Vincent Barzynski, an influential pastor of Saint Stanislaus Kostka in Chicago and Father Leopold Moczygemba, founder of America's first Polish settlement in Panna Maria, Texas. The new organization's stated goals were:

- to build Polish churches and schools
- to promote adherence to the Roman Catholic religion, and the religious and cultural traditions of the Polish nation
- to give fraternal assistance to Poles
- to take care of widows and orphans
- to help Poland to become an independent country again
- to establish the newspaper Pielgrzym as the official organ of the organization

From the time when many Polish Americans were disenchanted with the American Catholic hierarchy's preponderance of Irish and German bishops, the PRCUA's history spans notable periods in the development of the Polish American ethnic group, from the time of early settlement by immigrants from Poland (Poles) through their development of ethnic identity, to their dual struggles in support of Poland's independence and to find their place in American society.

== Newspaper and current activities ==
In 1886 the Pielgrzym was replaced by the weekly Gazeta Katolicka and in 1897 by the Naród Polski. The Naród Polski became a semi-monthly publication in 1946. The Naród Polski is the official publication of the PRCUA. Today, the Naród Polski is published monthly and contains both Polish and English articles in each issue. An online version is also available to subscribers.

At present, PRCUA has developed into a fraternal benefit society that performs religious, charitable, educational and civic work on behalf of its members and the Polish-American Community. Members join PRCUA primarily by purchasing life insurance and/or annuity certificates from the organization. Members participate in activities such as folk dancing and singing, language classes, crafts, and youth festivals through local lodges. PRCUA also extends residential mortgage loans to its members.

In addition, PRCUA is the principal patron of the Polish Museum of America, the largest ethnic museum in America located in Chicago, Illinois. The PRCUA's Home Office is located in Chicago, IL. This historic 1913 building (listed on the National Register of Historic Places in 2013) houses The Polish Museum of America (established in 1935) and its Library (which celebrated its 100th anniversary on April 18, 2015).

== Administration (2025-2026) ==
The organization's current Executive Officers are:

- Agnieszka J. Bastrzyk, ALMI, FICF, ACS – National President
- Micheline I. Jaminski, ALMI – National Vice President
- Julie Prado, ALMI, ACS – National Secretary-Treasurer

== See also ==
- Peter Kiołbassa (1837–1905) Polonia activist and Democratic politician in the City of Chicago who helped organize St. Stanislaus Kostka Parish
