= Basilica of St. Adalbert =

Basilica of St. Adalbert may refer to:

- St. Adalbert's Basilica, Buffalo, proclaimed a basilica in 1907
- Basilica of St. Adalbert (Grand Rapids, Michigan), proclaimed a basilica in 1979
