= Am-Pol Eagle Citizen of the Year Award =

Award

The Am-Pol Eagle Citizen of the Year Award is given out by the weekly Polish American newspaper the Am-Pol Eagle. The award is given to individuals and organizations in the Polish American community "in recognition of outstanding service and unselfish contributions on the behalf of the Polish-American cause" in various fields. There are 25 different categories but each category may not have a winner every year. The award is considered to be one of the highest honors given within the Polish-American community. The Am-Pol Eagle, published in Buffalo, New York, was founded in 1960 by Matthew Pelczynski who was known as "the voice of the Polish-American community."

== Am-Pol Eagle Citizen of the Year Award recipients ==
=== National ===
- 2013 – None
- 2012 – None
- 2011 – None
- 2008 – Anthony Bajdek
- 2007 – Christian Holocaust Survivors
- 2006 – Deborah M. Majka
- 2005 – Bozenna Urbanowicz Gilbride
- 2004 – Edward Rowny
- 2003 – Kaya Ploss
- 2002 – None
- 2001 – Susanne Lotarski
- 2000 – Les Kuszynski
- 1999 – Edward Pinkowski
- 1998 – James Pawelczyk
- 1997 – Michael Preisler
- 1996 – Stanley Milewski
- 1995 – Myra Lenard
- 1994 – Adam Maida
- 1993 – David Bonior
- 1992 – Edward G. Dykla
- 1981 – Aloysius Mazewski
- 1980 – Michael Kogutek
- 1979 – Carl Yastrzemski
- 1978 – John G. Fray
- 1977 – Alfred Abramowicz D.D
- 1976 – Zbigniew Brzezinski
- 1975 – Mitchell Kobelinski
- 1974 – Bobby Vinton
- 1973 – Barbara Mikulski
- 1972 – Eugene Kusielewicz

=== Art/Drama ===
- 2013 – Anna Gabryszak
- 2012 – Roman Kujawa
- 2011 – Tod Kniazuk
- 2009 – Rev. Walter Madej
- 2008 – Chopin Singing Society of Buffalo's production of Flis
- 2007 – None
- 2006 – Ron Urbanczyk
- 2005 – Brittany Mruczek
- 2004 – Kazimierz Braun
- 2003 – None
- 2002 – Gary Witkowski
- 2001 – Mark David Skura
- 2000 – Ted Pietrzak
- 1999 – Thoman Kazmierczak III
- 1998 – Thadeusz Pyzikiewicz
- 1997 – Fred Szatkowski
- 1996 – Kate Koperski
- 1995 – Tom Dudzick
- 1994 – Melva Wrobel
- 1993 – Thea Zastempowski
- 1992 – Christine Nowak
- 1981 – Louis F. Dlugosz
- 1980 – Laura Dory
- 1979 – George Lukasiewicz
- 1978 – Benedict T. Rozek
- 1977 – Alice Wadowski-Bak
- 1976 – Thomas Banasiak
- 1975 – Ann Nowak
- 1974 – Walter Prochownik
- 1973 – None
- 1972 – Daniel Reczek

=== Business ===
- 2013 – Michael Kucinski
- 2012 – Buszka Funeral Home
- 2011 – Kaminski & Sons Truck Equipment Inc.
- 2010 – The Rutowski Family Pharmacies
- 2009 – Danny Potts
- 2008 – Mazurek's Bakery
- 2007 – John Mills
- 1981 – F. Ronald Malecki
- 1980 – Chet Musialowski
- 1979 – Daniel J. Majeski
- 1978 – Stanley Hajeski
- 1977 – Mathew Witkowski
- 1976 – Alfred Fabiniak
- 1975 – Andrew Ciolek
- 1974 – Florian Burczynski
- 1973 – Joseph Dziminski Jr.
- 1972 – Robert Kowalewski

=== Civic Leader ===
- 2013 – None
- 2012 – Bob Kresse
- 2011 – None
- 2009 – The Felician Sisters
- 2008 – None
- 2007 – Dr. Norman Weinberg
- 2005 – James Ostrowski
- 2004 – Bishop Edward M. Grosz
- 2003 – Msgr. Matthew Kopacz
- 2001 – John Dobrzenski
- 1994 – Pauline Nowak / William Trezevant
- 1993 – James Konicki
- 1981 – Rev. Joseph Bialek
- 1980 – None
- 1979 – None
- 1978 – None
- 1977 – None
- 1976 – None
- 1975 – Bishop Daniel Cyganowski
- 1974 – Robert Biniszkiewicz
- 1973 – Edward Posluszny
- 1972 – Dennis Kazmierczak

=== Community Leader (Non-Pole) ===
- 2013 – Dr. Andrew Wise
- 2012 – Jean Dickson
- 2011 – Mary Lanham
- 2009 – Amy Betros
- 2008 – Mary Holland
- 2007 – Dr. Muriel Howard
- 1981 – Most Rev. Edward D. Head
- 1980 – None
- 1979 – Buffalo Philharmonic Orchestra
- 1978 – Richard Kellman
- 1977 – Douglas L. Turner
- 1976 – Hon. Jack Kemp
- 1975 – Edward V. Regan
- 1974 – Dr. E. K. Fretwell

=== Community Organization ===
- 2013 – Broadway Market 125th Anniversary Committee
- 2012 – Permanent Chair of Polish Culture Canisius College
- 2011 – Polish Heritage Society of Rochester
- 2010 – Pulaski Police Association
- 2009 – Polish Singers Alliance District IX
- 2008 – Harmony Polish Folk Ensemble
- 2006 – Cheektowaga Polish American Festival Committee
- 2002 – University at Buffalo Polish Student Association
- 1981 – Polish American Congress, Western New York Division
- 1980 – Niagara Frontier Post 1041
- 1979 – Walden District Taxpayers Association

=== Culture ===
- 2013 – Kathleen Rumfola
- 2012 – Dr. Peter Gessner
- 2011 – Robert Johnson
- 2010 – Sophie Hodorowicz-Knab
- 2009 – Rev. Louis Dolinic
- 2008 – Andrew Golebiowski
- 2007 – Wanda Slawinski
- 1981 – Adeline Wujeikewski
- 1980 – Hon.Frank Swiatek
- 1979 – Helena Golebiowski
- 1978 – Alice Posluszny
- 1977 – Maria Laskowska
- 1976 – Thaddeus Nyczko
- 1975 – Marian Strzelczyk
- 1974 – Sister Ellen Marie
- 1973 – Emilie Lubelski
- 1972 – Leonard Glowinski

=== Education ===
- 2013 – Ashli Skura Dreher
- 2012 – Fr. Michael Sajda
- 2011 – Pomost International
- 2009 – Msgr. Adamski Polish Saturday School
- 2008 – Fr.Charles Jagodzinski
- 2007 – Patricia Weinreich
- 2006 – Danuta Nycz
- 1981 – Edward Szmraj
- 1980 – Father Leon Krop
- 1979 – Raymond Dziedzic
- 1978 – Dr. Joseph Gizinski
- 1977 – Anne Szczesny
- 1976 – Sister Mary Pachomia
- 1975 – Leonard Sikora
- 1974 – Frank Benbenek
- 1973 – Thomas Michalski
- 1972 – Mary Amalia

=== Fraternal ===
- 2013 – Pulaski Police Assn.
- 2012 – None
- 2011 – None
- 2010 – Dunkirk Dom Polski
- 2006 – Polish Union of America
- 1981 – Lucy Rubach
- 1980 – Joseph Lipa
- 1979 – Thaddeus J. Zolkiewicz
- 1978 – Victor A. Drajem, Jr.
- 1977 – Bronislaw Durewicz
- 1976 – Clara Owczarczak
- 1975 – Lawrence Wujcukowski
- 1974 – Joseph Starosciak
- 1973 – Clara Weber
- 1972 – Irene Cwiklinski

=== Good Neighbor ===
- 2013 – None
- 2012 – None
- 2011 – None
- 2010 – Canadian Polish Congress - Niagara District
- 2007 – Chester & Diane Stranczek
- 2006 – OLC Pierogi Makers
- 2001 – Daniel Mocniak

=== Government ===
- 2013 – Gerald Chwalinski
- 2012 – None
- 2011 – Robert Giza
- 2010 – Steven J. Stepniak
- 2008 – Catherine Rybczynski
- 2007 – Richard Kloc
- 1981 – Daved Rutecki
- 1980 – Thomas Owczarczak
- 1979 – Edwin A. Gorski
- 1978 – Thaddeus J. Szymanski
- 1977 – William M. Skretny
- 1976 – Hon. Henry Nowak
- 1975 – Joseph Bala
- 1974 – Stanley Makowski
- 1973 – Stan Bolas
- 1972 – Daniel Kwiatkowski

=== Health/Medicine ===
- 2013 – Jean Wactawski-Wende
- 2012 – Dr. Edwin Grzankowski
- 2011 – None
- 2008 – Dr.Kevin Cichocki
- 2007 – Dr. William F. Wieczorek, Ph.D.
- 1981 – Dr. Daniel Kozers
- 1980 – Dr. Robert Zwirecki
- 1979 – Anthony Prezyna, M.D.
- 1978 – Dr. Joseph Matala
- 1977 – None
- 1976 – Dr. Richard Powell
- 1975 – Dr. Lucian Rutecki
- 1974 – Dr. Eugene Ruszaj
- 1973 – None
- 1972 – Dr. Joseph Kij

=== Heritage ===
- 2013 – Amy Smardz
- 2012 – Edward Prabucki
- 2011 – Henry Chimes
- 2010 – Dr. Margaret Stefanski
- 2009 – Barbara Frackiewicz
- 2008 – Polish Heritage Dancers of Western New York
- 2007 – Gregory Witul
- 2006 – Donna Zellner Neal
- 2005 – Bishop Thaddeus Peplowski
- 2004 – Martin Biniasz
- 2003 – Robert Fronckowiak
- 2002 – Lucyna Dziedzic
- 2001 – Edward Kornowski
- 2000 – David Newman
- 1999 – Polish Social Volunteers
- 1998 – Honorable Carl Bucki
- 1997 – Andrew Golebiowski
- 1996 – Walter Grabowski
- 1995 – Diane Cieczka – Jircitano
- 1994 – Benjamin Fiore
- 1992 – Edmund Kiedrowski & Alice Kiedrowski
- 1987 – Victoria Jarnot
- 1981 – Genevieve Pietka
- 1980 – Matthew Kubik
- 1979 – Theodore Mikoll
- 1978 – Stanly Dawidziak
- 1977 – William Borodacz
- 1976 – Zdaislaw Ordon
- 1975 – Bronislaus Trzyszewski

=== Humanitarian ===
- 2013 – None
- 2012 – Lisa Florczak
- 2011 – None
- 2010 – Tom Zablotny
- 2007 – Christine Jozwiak
- 1981 – Judy Kasinski
- 1980 – Caroline Szymanski
- 1979 – Verna C. Neubauer
- 1978 – Irene Szczesnika
- 1977 – Dorothy Orlowski
- 1976 – Sister Mary Desponsata
- 1975 – Rev. Edward Ulaszewski
- 1974 – Richard Glowacki
- 1973 – Sophia Dabrowski
- 1972 – Apolonia Szpakowska

=== Human Rights ===
- 1980 – Lech Wałęsa

=== Individual in Organizations ===
- 2013 – Charles Peszynski
- 2012 – Stephen Flor & Andrew Pilecki
- 2011 – Bernadine Szymanski
- 2010 – Frances Cirbus
- 2009 – Edward Reska
- 2008 – Florence Oleszek
- 2007 – Irene Pawlowski
- 1981 – Walter Chrzanowski
- 1980 – Frank Niemiec
- 1979 – Richard B. Solecki
- 1978 – Edward Sieracki
- 1977 – Michael J. Kogutek
- 1976 – Karol Tomaszewski
- 1975 – John Fliss
- 1974 – Art Kilichowski
- 1973 – Leo A. Trembowicz
- 1972 – Jack R. Poczciwinski

=== Labor ===
- 2013 – None
- 2012 – Stan Nowak
- 2011 – None
- 2006 – Paul R. Dobrzenski
- 1981 – Joseph Benbenek
- 1980 – Edward Ziarnowski
- 1979 – Jerome C. Gorski
- 1978 – Hon.Richard Slisz
- 1977 – Casimir Walas
- 1976 – Peter Rybka
- 1975 – Frank Malinkiewicz
- 1974 – Matt Ginal
- 1973 – Louis Dudek
- 1972 – Floyd Lisinski

=== Law ===
- 2013 – Robert Ciesielski
- 2012 – Hon. Leslie Foschio
- 2011 – Charles Tomaszewski
- 2010 – Hon. Henry J. Nowak, Jr.
- 2009 – Hon. William Skretny
- 2008 – Hon.Michael Pietruszka
- 2007 – William Hochul
- 1981 – Eugene Buczkowski
- 1980 – Norman Walawender
- 1979 – Hon. Joseph S. Forma
- 1978 – Hon. Edward V. Mazur
- 1977 – Hon. Julian F. Kubiniec
- 1976 – Hon. Victor Manz
- 1975 – Hon. William Ostrowski
- 1974 – Leonard Walentynowicz
- 1973 – Hon. Theodore Kasler
- 1972 – Hon. Alois C. Mazur

=== Media ===
- 2013 – Christopher Parker
- 2012 – Charity Vogel
- 2011 – Rick Franusiak
- 2010 – Mark Wozniak
- 2009 – Steve Cichon
- 2008 – Christopher Byrd
- 2007 – Ron Dombrowski
- 1996 – Alice Wadowski-Bak
- 1981 – Don Polec
- 1980 – Matthew Gryta
- 1979 – Robert S. Bukaty
- 1978 – Eugene M. Krzyzynski
- 1977 – John Krieger
- 1976 – Wanda Kogut
- 1975 – Daniel Lesniak
- 1974 – Matt Kopanty
- 1973 – Sister Mary Donata

=== Military/Veteran ===
- 2013 – None
- 2012 – Brett Gornewicz
- 2011 – None
- 2009 – Stanley Blake
- 2008 – Alfreda Miecyjak, Krystyna Pienkowska, & Jozefa Solecki
- 2007 – Stanley & Antonina Markut

=== Music ===
- 2013 – Michelle Cofield
- 2012 – Michael Zachowicz
- 2011 – CitySide
- 2010 – Emily Tworek-Helenbrook
- 2009 – Jacek Muzyk
- 2008 – Jerry Darlak and the Touch
- 2007 – Bell Choir of Holy Mother of the Rosary Cathedral
- 2006 – Goo Goo Dolls
- 2005 – Art Kubera
- 2004 – St. Michael the Archangel Choir
- 2003 – Sunshine Records
- 2002 – St. Casimir Choir
- 2001 – Buffalo Concertina All-Stars
- 2000 – Buffalo Polka Boosters
- 1999 – Steve Krzeminski
- 1998 – Valerian Ruminski
- 1997 – Donald Jenczka
- 1996 – Radosc-Joy Choir
- 1995 – Villa Maria Chorale
- 1994 – David Seweryniak
- 1993 – Mark Kohan
- 1992 – Linda Orszulka
- 1986 – Edward Witul
- 1981 – Walter Szwajda
- 1980 – Louis Distel
- 1979 – Sr. Mary Virginis Kozlowska
- 1978 – Art Kubera
- 1977 – Czarnik Quartet
- 1976 – Genia Lars
- 1975 – Michael Tworek
- 1974 – Joseph Macielag
- 1973 – Sister M. Martinelle
- 1972 – Janina Staniewicz

=== Politics ===
- 2013 – Steven Walters
- 2012 – Hon. Dennis Gabryszak
- 2011 – None
- 2010 – Kevin Smardz
- 2009 – Supervisor Mary Holtz
- 2006 – Marck C. Poloncarz
- 2005 – Deborah Bucki
- 2004 – Stasia Vogel
- 2003 – Senator George Maziarz
- 2002 – Joseph Augustine
- 2001 – Norman Polanski
- 2000 – Raymond K. Dusza
- 1998 – Mayor Robert Kesicki
- 1997 – Mayor Robert Kucewicz
- 1996 – Greg Olma
- 1995 – Janice Kowalski – Kelly
- 1994 – James Jankowiak
- 1993 – Sen. William Stachowski
- 1992 – Leonard Gramza
- 1981 – Sen. William Stachowski
- 1980 – Hon. William Rogowski
- 1979 – Hon. Edward J. Rutkowski
- 1978 – Stanley Stachowski
- 1977 – Hon. Richard Okoniewski
- 1976 – Hon. Shirley Storarski
- 1975 – Genevieve Starosciak
- 1974 – Dennis Gorski
- 1973 – Stan Franczyk
- 1972 – Legislator Stanley Zagora

=== Religion ===
- 2013 – Rev. Richard Jedrzejewski
- 2012 – Rev. Mike Burzynski
- 2011 – Parishioners of St. Adalbert's Basilica
- 2010 – Sr. Judith M. Kubicki, CSSF
- 2009 – Rev. Walter Szczesny
- 2008 – Fr.Anzelm Chalupka
- 2007 – Daniel Geary, OFM, Conv.
- 1981 – Rev. Sister Alberta Surowiec
- 1980 – Rev. Max Panczakiewicz
- 1979 – Rev. Robert K. Golombek
- 1978 – Rev. Lucian Krolikowski
- 1977 – Rev. Msgr. D. J. Szostak
- 1976 – Rev. Msgr. Chester Meloch
- 1975 – Mother Mary Benice
- 1974 – Rev. Anthony Konieczny
- 1973 – Rev. John Gabalski
- 1972 – Rt. Rev. Msgr. Francis Wlodarczak

=== Science ===
- 2013 – None
- 2012 – None
- 2011 – None
- 2010 – Leonard Amborski
- 2006 – Arthur M. Michalek
- 1981 – Dr. Felix Milgrom
- 1980 – Dr. Francis Bajer
- 1979 – Eugene Sulkowski, Ph. D
- 1978 – Dr. Michael S. Hudecki
- 1977 – Dr. Raymond Trudnowski
- 1976 – John Kopczynski
- 1975 – Dr. Peter S. Pawlik
- 1974 – Dr. Sigmund Zakrzewski

=== Sports ===
- 2013 – Stan Figiel
- 2012 – Don Pieczynski
- 2011 – Candis Kapuscinski
- 2010 – Rob Gronkowski
- 2009 – Dan Kryzanowicz
- 2008 – Jenn Stuczynski
- 2007 – Lee Stempniak
- 1981 – Ben Richards
- 1980 – Ray Wasielewski
- 1979 – John Sikorski
- 1978 – Frank Podsiadlo
- 1977 – Robert Pacholski
- 1976 – Henry Breski
- 1975 – Peter Machnica
- 1974 – Ron Joworski

=== Youth ===
- 2013 – None
- 2012 – None
- 2011 – Katherine Rivard
- 2010 – Gabrielle Pawlowski
- 2009 – Barry Pawlowski & Christina Slomczewski
- 2008 – Corrine Lasek
- 2007 – Peter Miecyjak
- 2006 – Alicia Krawiec
- 2005 – Kimberly Majewski
- 2004 – Veronica Couzo
- 2003 – Brooke Wiechec / Schwedner
- 2002 – None
- 2001 – Marguerite Rivard
- 2000 – Aniela Baj
- 1999 – Tersa Kaczynska
- 1998 – Conrad Malkowski
- 1997 – Agatha Glowacki
- 1996 – Craig Bucki
- 1995 – Thomas Wasiuta
- 1994 – Alexandra Krupski
- 1993 – Lisa Urbanski
- 1992 – David Smaczniak
- 1981 – Irene Woszczak
- 1980 – Wallace Piotrowski
- 1979 – Ann Dobrowolski
- 1978 – Joe Kroczynski
- 1977 – Denise Gryglewicz
- 1976 – Carl Bucki
- 1975 – Kasia Wrobel
- 1974 – Rev. Richard Zajac
- 1973 – Ray Marciniak
