= St. Gerard's Roman Catholic Church =

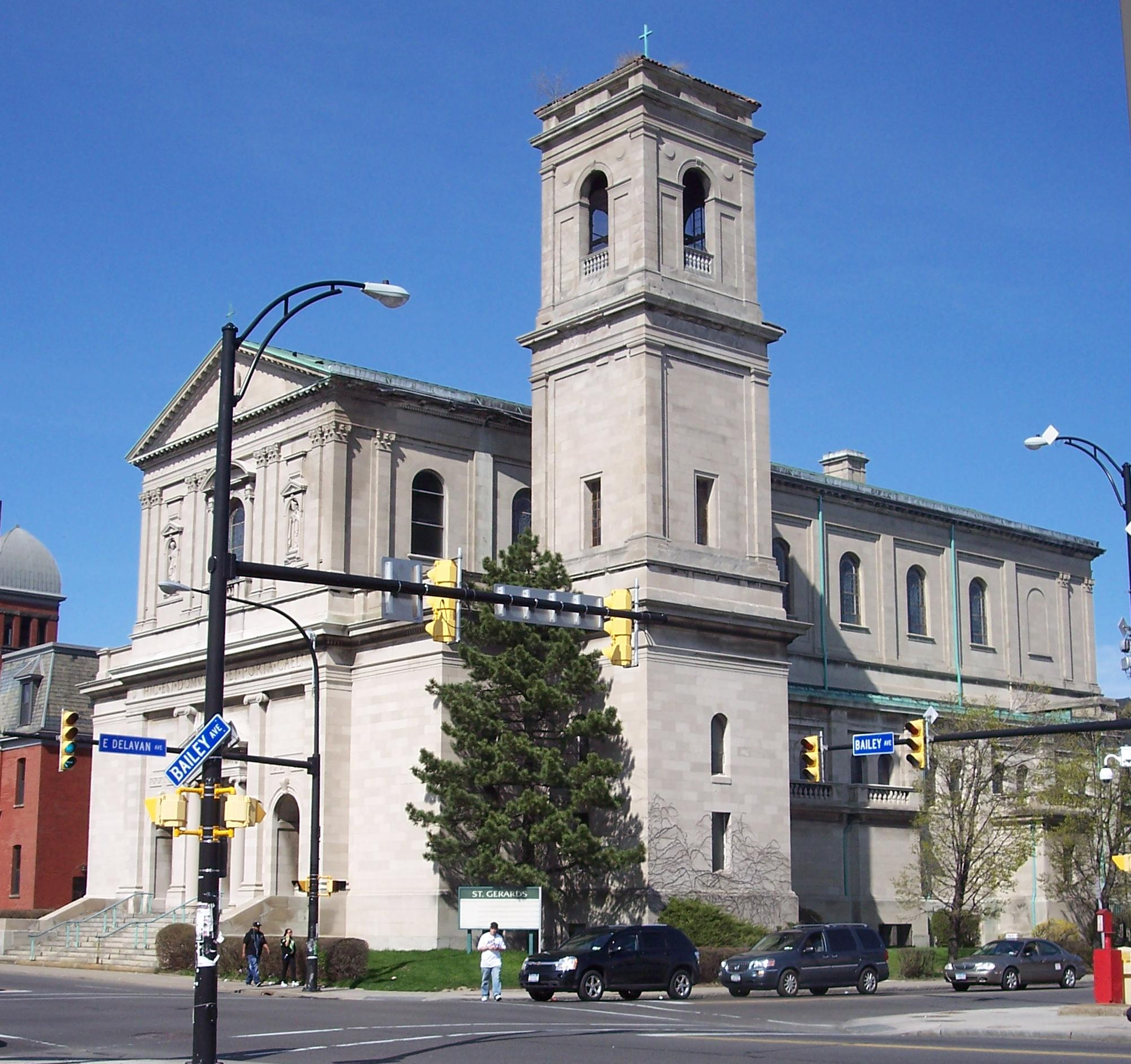
- St. Gerard's Roman Catholic Church
- 42.923091°N 78.813131°W
- Location: 1190 E Delavan Ave, Buffalo, New York
- Country: United States
- Denomination: Roman Catholic

History
- Status: Parish church
- Founded: 1902
- Founder: William J. Schreck
- Dedicated: 1913

Architecture
- Functional status: "Abandoned"
- Architect(s): Schmill & Gould
- Architectural type: Basilica
- Style: Renaissance Revival
- Completed: Sept. 24th, 1911

Specifications
- Capacity: 880
- Height: 110 feet (33.5 m)
- Materials: Indiana limestone

Saint Gerard's Roman Catholic Church is located at 1190 E Delavan Avenue, in the East Side of Buffalo, New York. The Roman Basilica-style church previously served as a Catholic parish of the Roman Catholic Diocese of Buffalo. The church held its final full mass on January 1, 2008, and has since been turned into a mosque.

== History ==
This church is the second to the parish, and was built in response to demand for a larger place of worship. The building, a Roman Basilica style, is based on the design of Basilica of Saint Paul Outside the Walls in Rome, being one-third as large. The interior of the church contains 12 granite columns, a coffered ceiling, 15 murals, 26 rondos, and a fresco. In 1930 the nave was raised to 60 ft. and a three-stage, 110 ft. bell tower was added.

== Moving the Church ==
In October 2008, "Mary Our Queen" parish in Norcross, Georgia expressed interest in moving the church 900 miles south to serve as their new house of worship. Their $16 million plans call for the church to be completely deconstructed, packed, and trucked south for reassembly for continued use as a Catholic church. During the summer of 2010, "Mary Our Queen" arranged the removal of a 7 ft, 1600 lb statue of St. Gerard. The statue was broken in two while being transported to their Georgia parish. In July 2016 the 47 beautiful stained glass windows were removed from the church. The windows will be restored by Lynchburg Stained Glass and re-installed at the new "Mary Our Queen" parish in Georgia. Eventually the deal to move the church fell through and the building was sold to an Islamic group to be used as a Masjid Al Salam mosque.

== Gallery ==
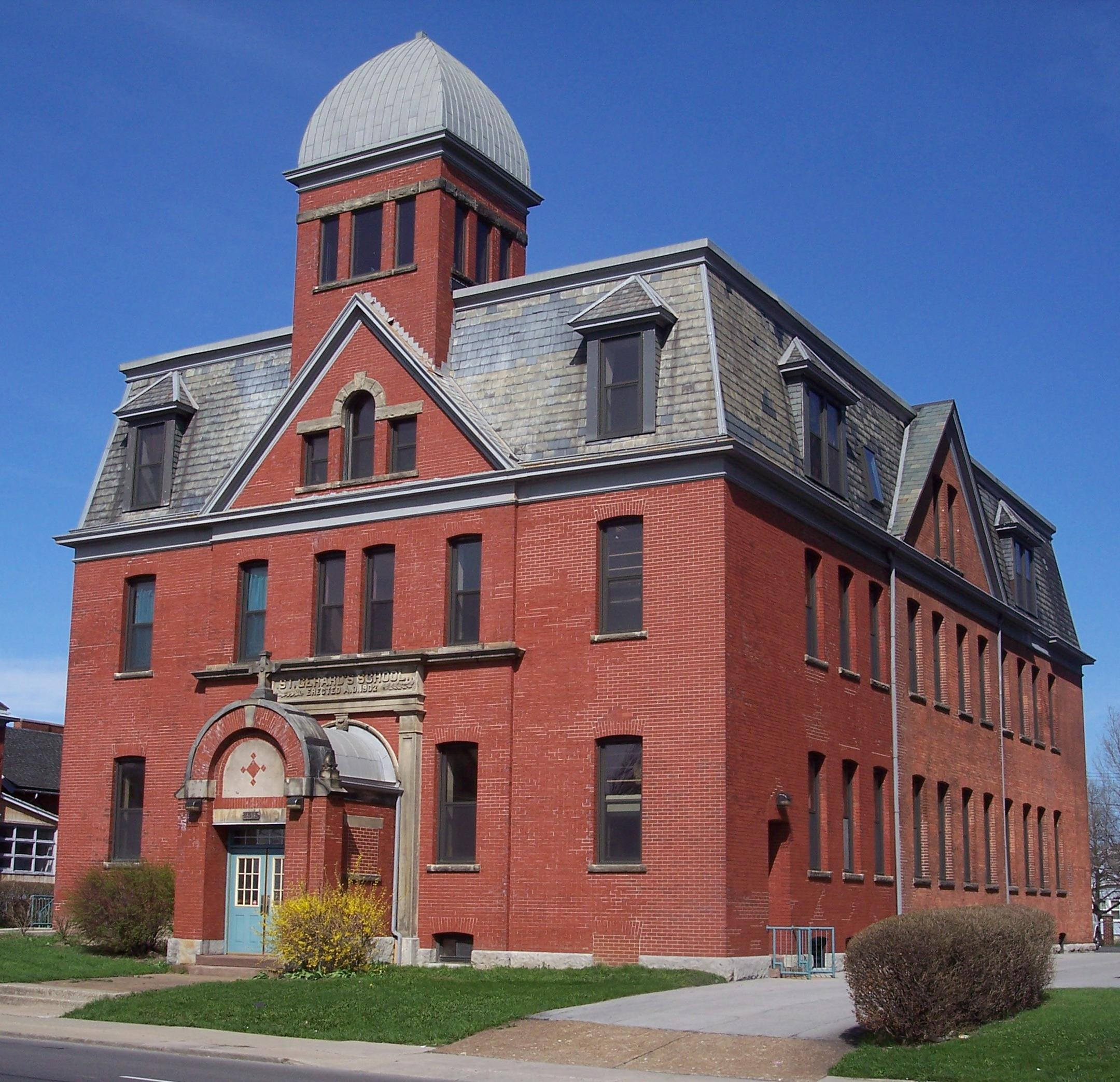
Adjacent school house

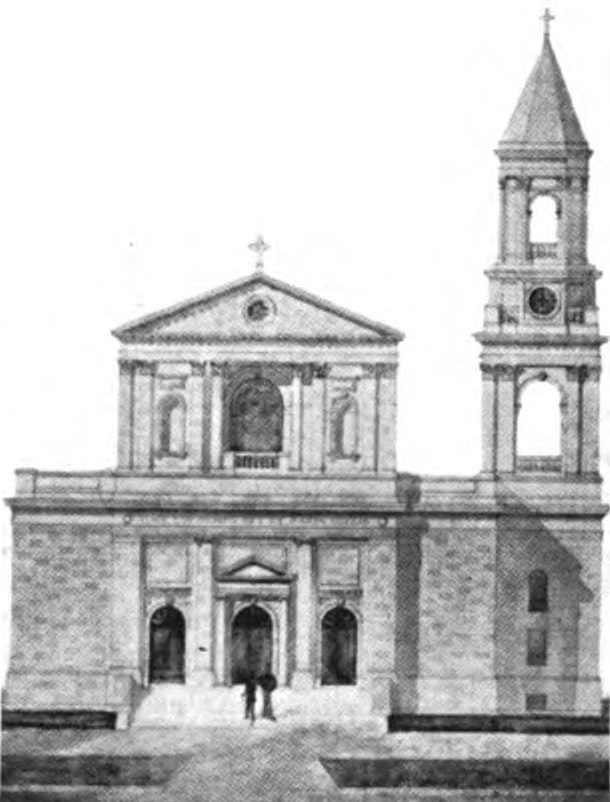
The church as it appeared in a 1914 publication

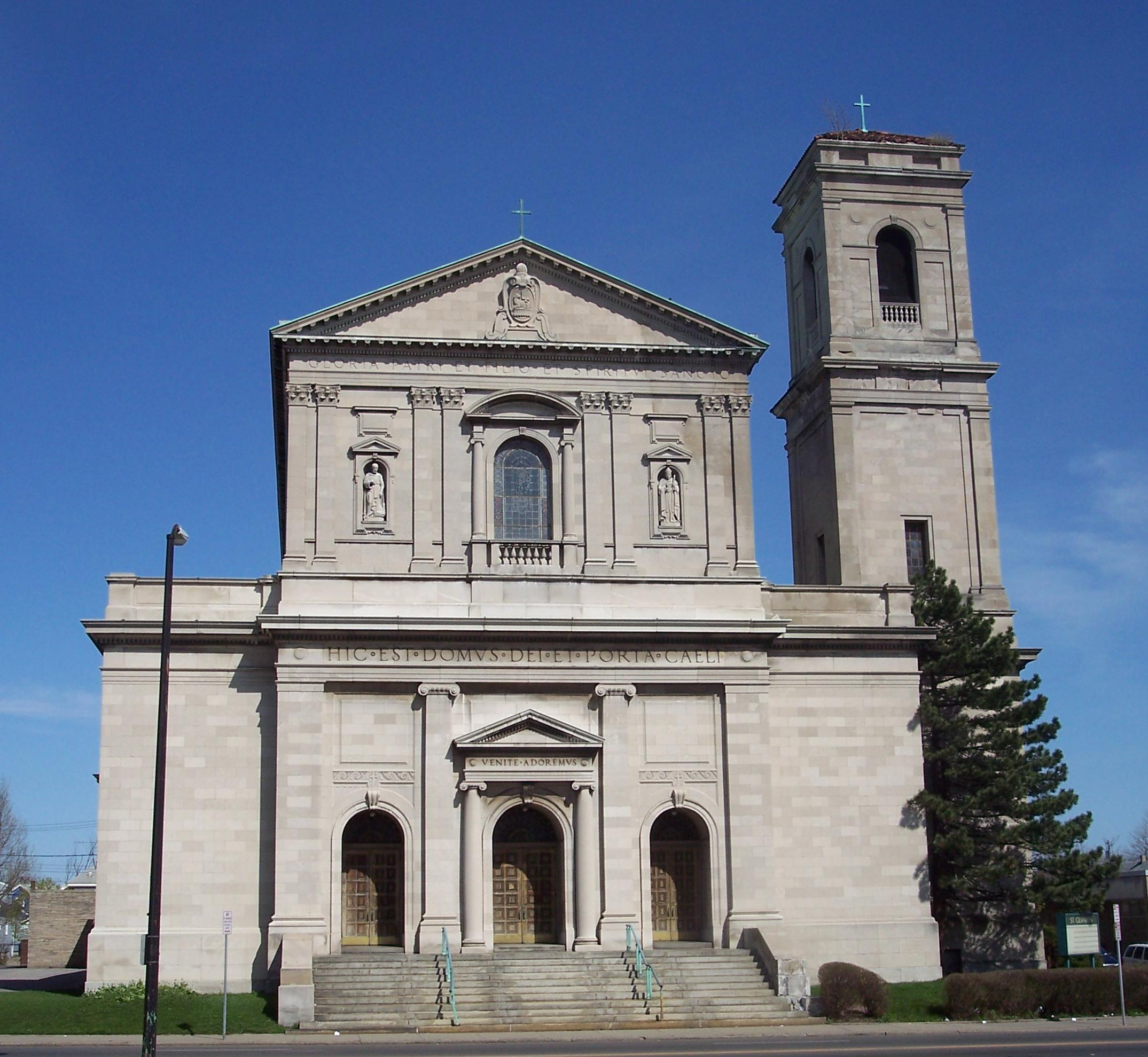
Front outside View

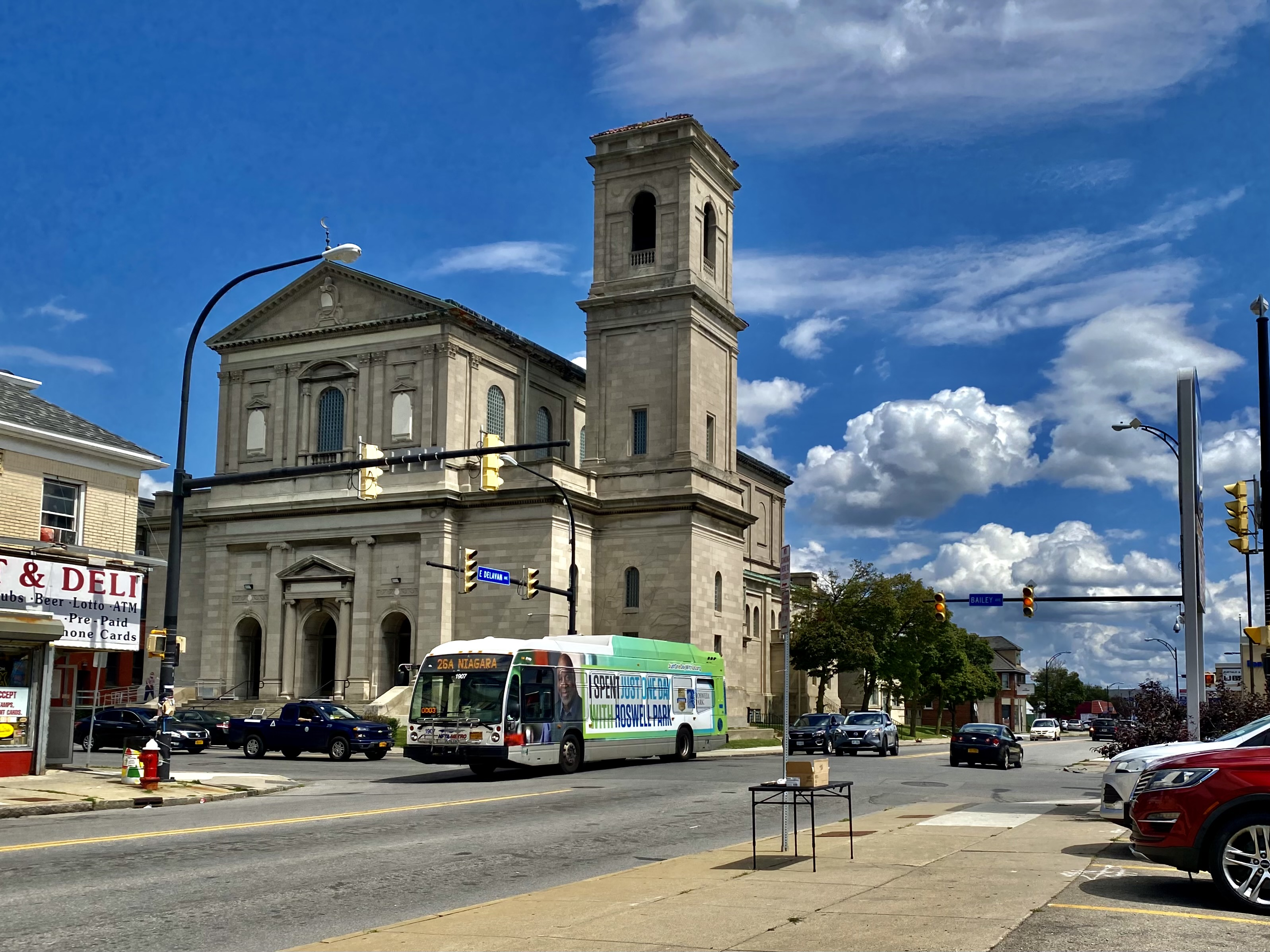
Masjid Al Salam mosque in 2021
