= Maria Skłodowska-Curie Medallion =

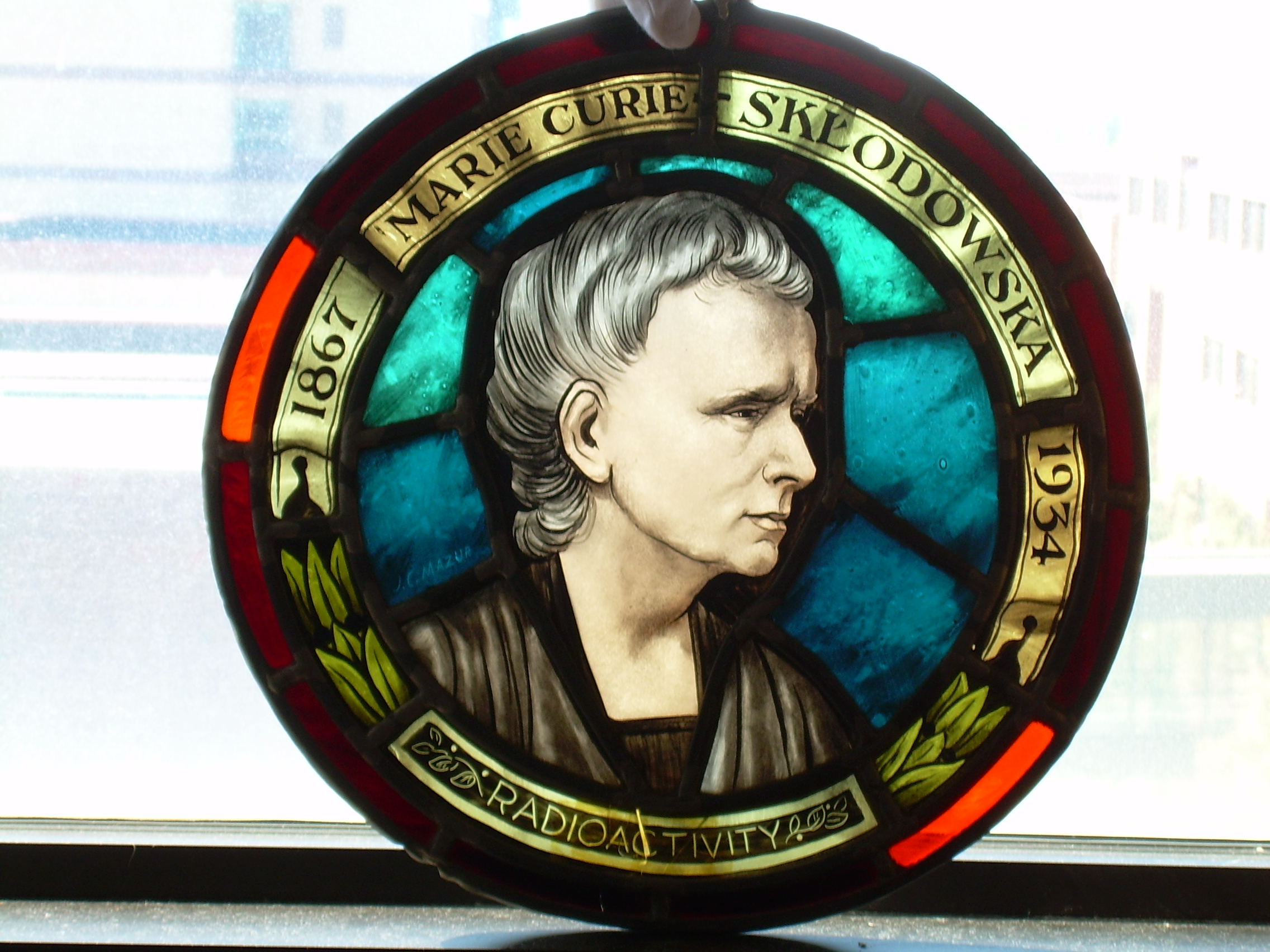
- Artist: Jozef C. Mazur
- Year: 1955
- Type: Stained glass
- Dimensions: 31.8 cm × 31.8 cm (12.5 in × 12.5 in)
- Location: University at Buffalo; Buffalo NY

The Marie Skłodowska-Curie Medallion is one panel from a set of four created by Jozef C. Mazur. It honors Marie Curie and currently resides in the Polish Room at the University at Buffalo Libraries.

== History ==
On August 3, 1955, the University at Buffalo created the Polish Room. Polish-American artist Jozef C. Mazur was hired to plan and decorate the room. Items included a set of four stained-glass medallions depicting famous Poles.

At some point between the founding and when the Polish Room was moved in 1978, the medallions went missing. In 2007, the Marie Skłodowska-Curie Medallion was found for sale on eBay by University at Buffalo alumnus Gregory Witul. Witul was able to coordinate the return of the medallion to the university. A formal re-dedication was held on November 4, 2007.

On April 6, 2008, Witul received the Am-Pol Eagle Citizen of the Year Award for Heritage, for finding and coordinating the return of the medallion. Peter Miecyjak received the Am-Pol Eagle Citizen of the Year Award for Youth, in part for organizing the re-dedication.
