= Corpus Christi R. C. Church Complex =

Historic church in New York, United States

Corpus Christi (Church)
- Corpus Christi (Church)
- Location: 199 Clark Street, Buffalo, New York
- Country: United States
- Denomination: Roman Catholic
- Website: Corpus Christi Church

History
- Status: Parish church
- Founded: 1898
- Founder: Hyacinth Fudzinski
- Dedicated: 1907

Architecture
- Functional status: "Active"
- Completed: June 13, 1909 (church)
- Construction cost: US$200 thousand

Specifications
- Capacity: 1,650
- Length: 170 feet (51.8 m)
- Width: 90 feet (27.4 m)
- Materials: Onondaga limestone faced with Medina sandstone
- Corpus Christi R.C. Church Complex
- U.S. National Register of Historic Places
- New York State Register of Historic Places
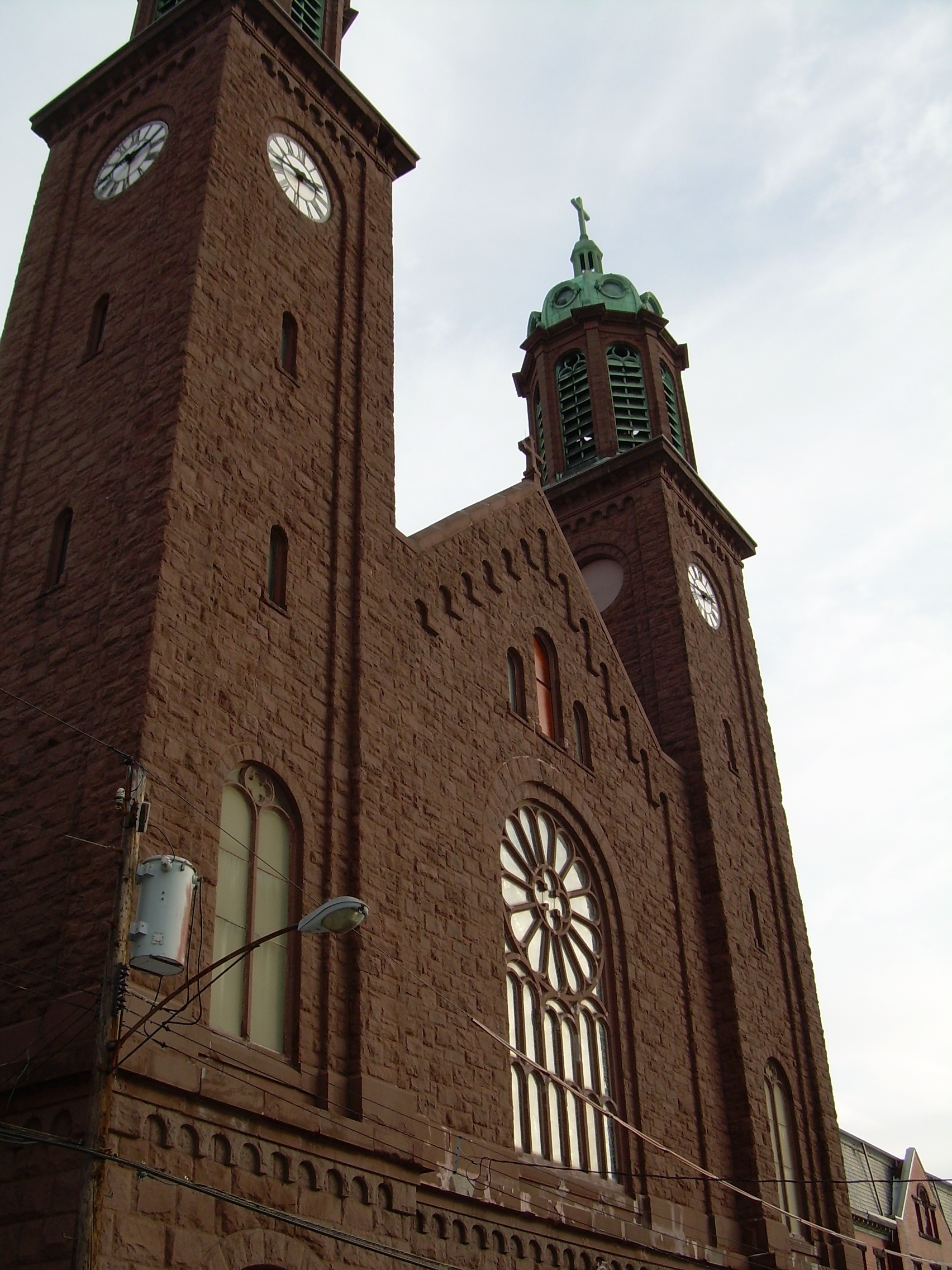
- Corpus Christi R.C. Church, March 2009

- Location within New York Location within the United States
- Location: 199 Clark St., Buffalo, New York
- Coordinates: 42°53′29″N 78°50′10″W
- Area: 2.4 acres (0.97 ha)
- Built: 1900
- Architects: Schmill and Gould
- Architectural style: Romanesque
- NRHP reference No.: 07000630

Significant dates
- Added to NRHP: June 27, 2007
- Designated NYSRHP: March 20, 2007

The Corpus Christi R.C. Church Complex is a series of several buildings located on Buffalo's historic East Side within the Roman Catholic Diocese of Buffalo. The complex contains the Kolbe Center, Sears Street Hall, rectory, convent, and the huge sandstone church that towers over the neighborhood. The complex school was closed in 1982, and has since been razed.

== History ==
Corpus Christi was the seventh Polish parish established in Buffalo. The church was founded by Fr. Hyacinth Fudzinski, a Franciscan friar from Czarnków, Poland. It was established to serve the religious needs of the growing Polish community of the East Side. The church community grew in the early 20th century as immigrants poured into the neighborhood. The church has suffered the problems that have plagued other inner-city churches across America. As parishioners moved to the suburbs, the church became increasingly empty during masses, and the school was closed in the early 1980s.

== Building ==
Completed in 1907, Corpus Christi's imposing facade is wrought of Hummelstown brownstone quarried in Dauphin County, Pennsylvania. The church has three large bells, all in the north tower. The largest bell dates to 1898, and the smaller bells were installed in 1948. All were cast by the Meneely Bell Foundry in Troy, New York. The crosses atop the towers were filled with letters from the parish's school children before they were affixed to the cupolas. The original church windows were made by Franz Mayer works in Munich, Germany.

== Present day ==
In June 2003, the Franciscan friars decided that they could no longer administer to the community due to financial and other concerns. This announcement led to the creation of a committee named the Friends of Corpus Christi, who sought to find another order to lead the faithful. This search yielded results when the Pauline Fathers agreed to take over the church property and continue its operation.

The Paulines currently have two priests and one brother administering to the parish community. The current pastor is Fr. Anselm Chalupka.

The complex was listed on the National Register of Historic Places in 2007.

== Gallery ==
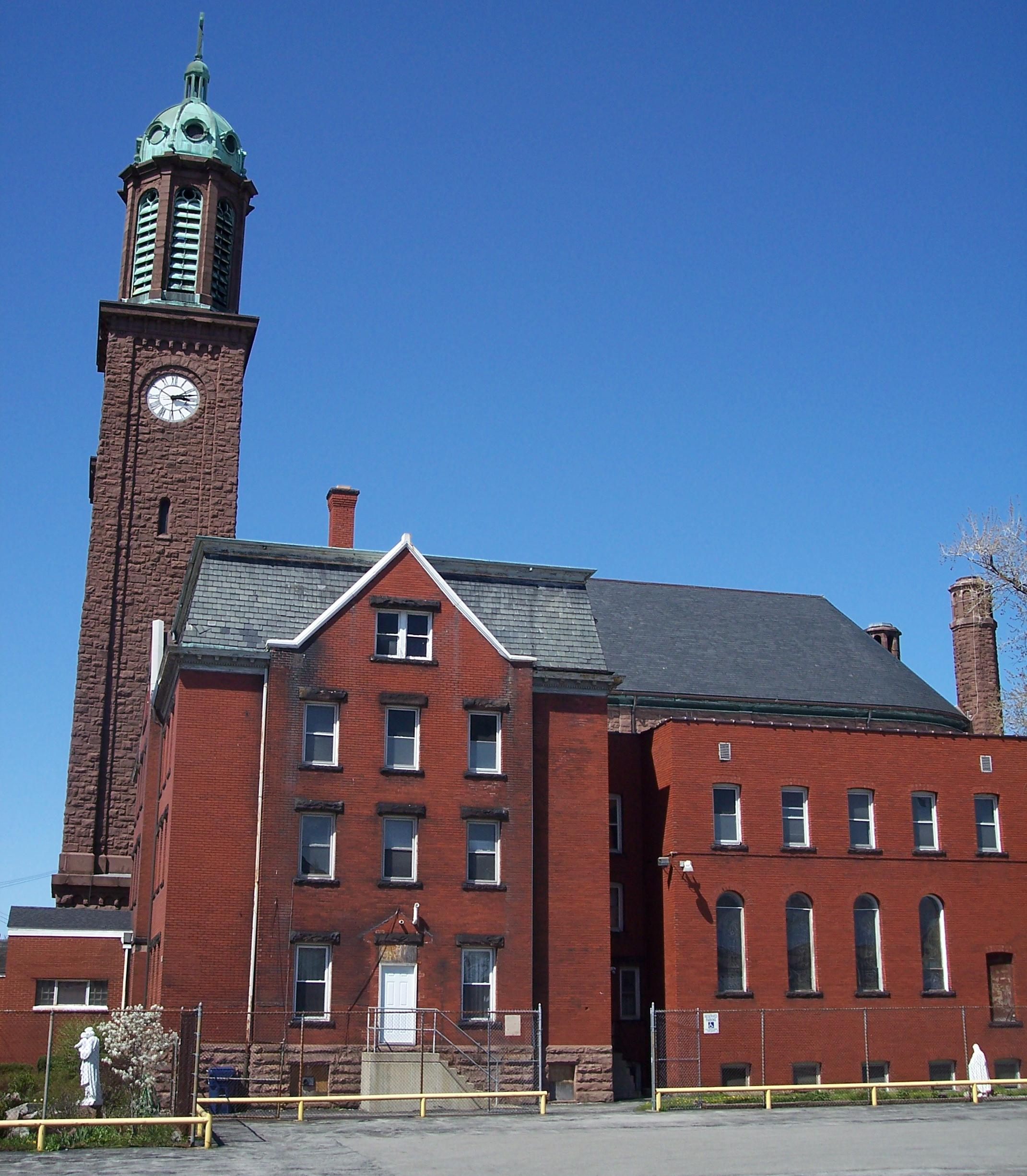
Side view

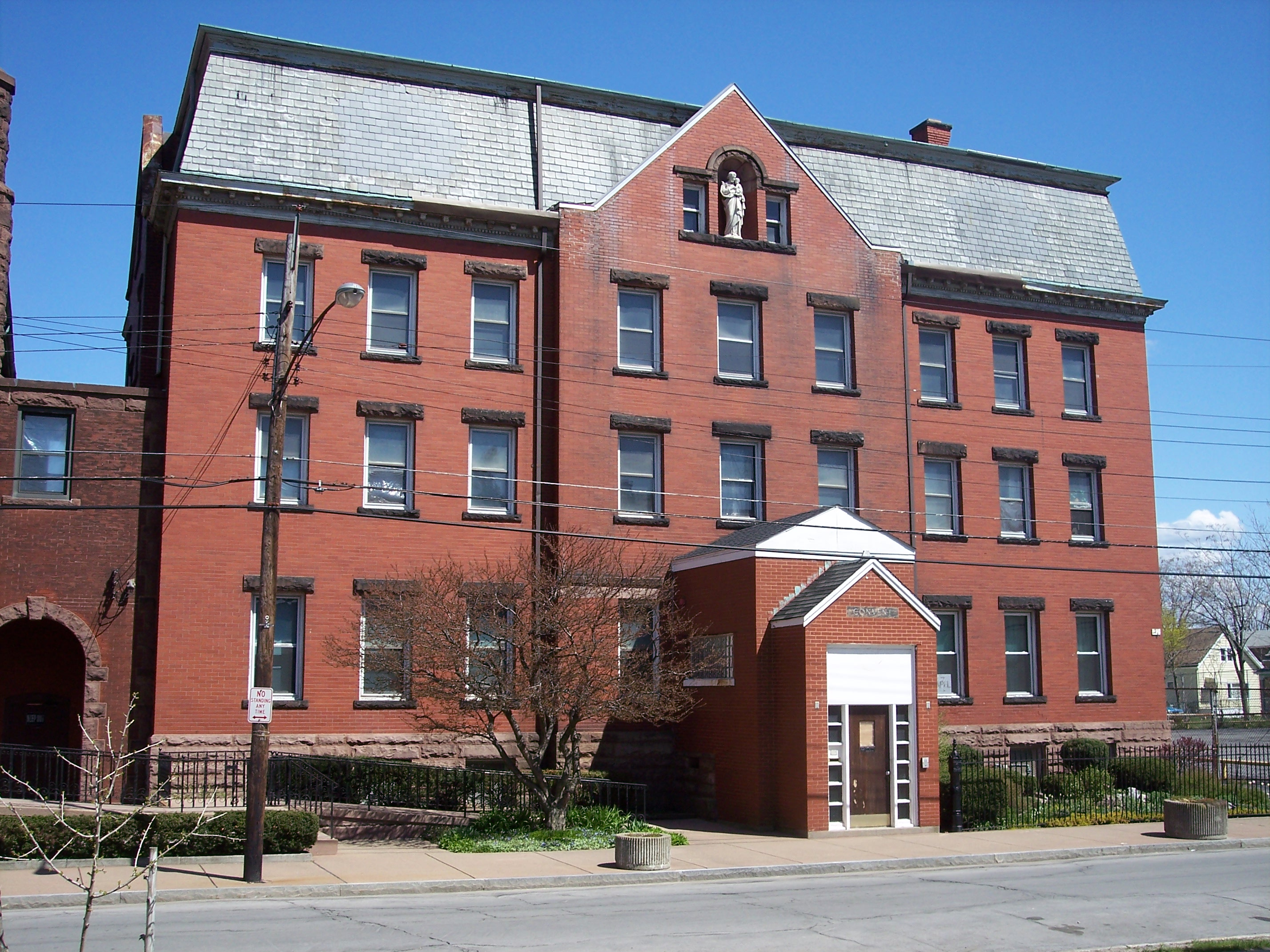
Convent

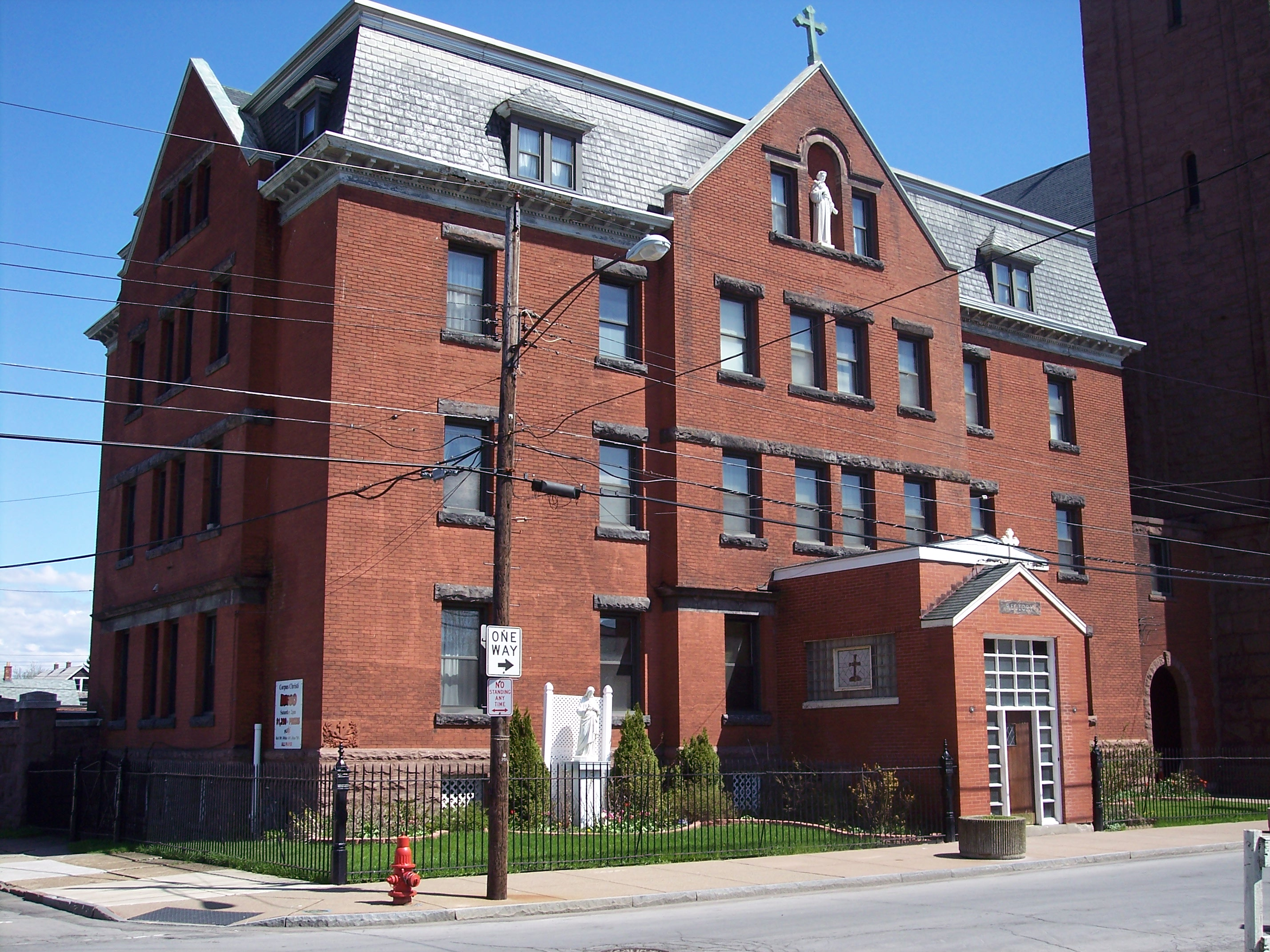
Rectory

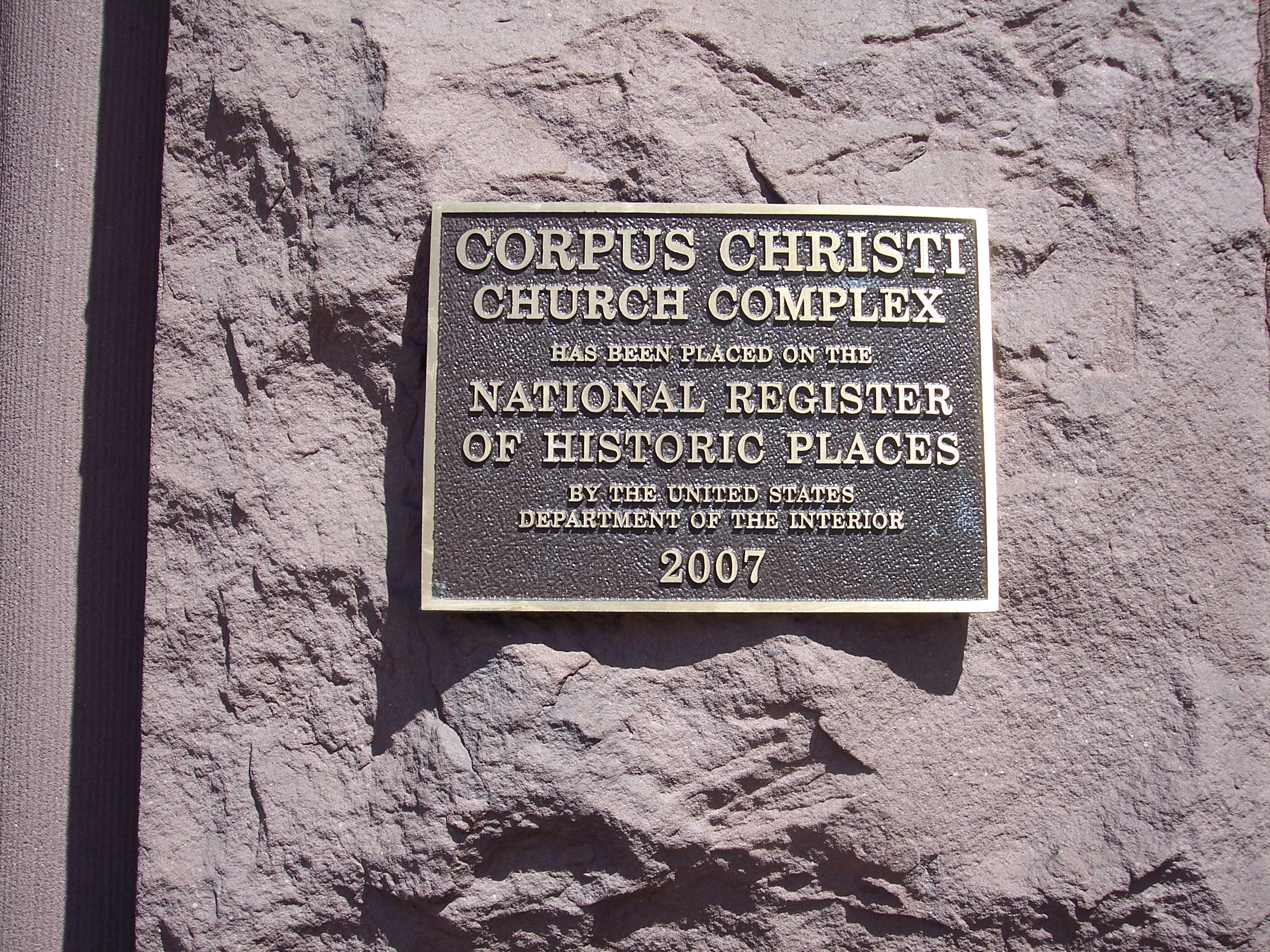
Plaque to the right of the front entrance

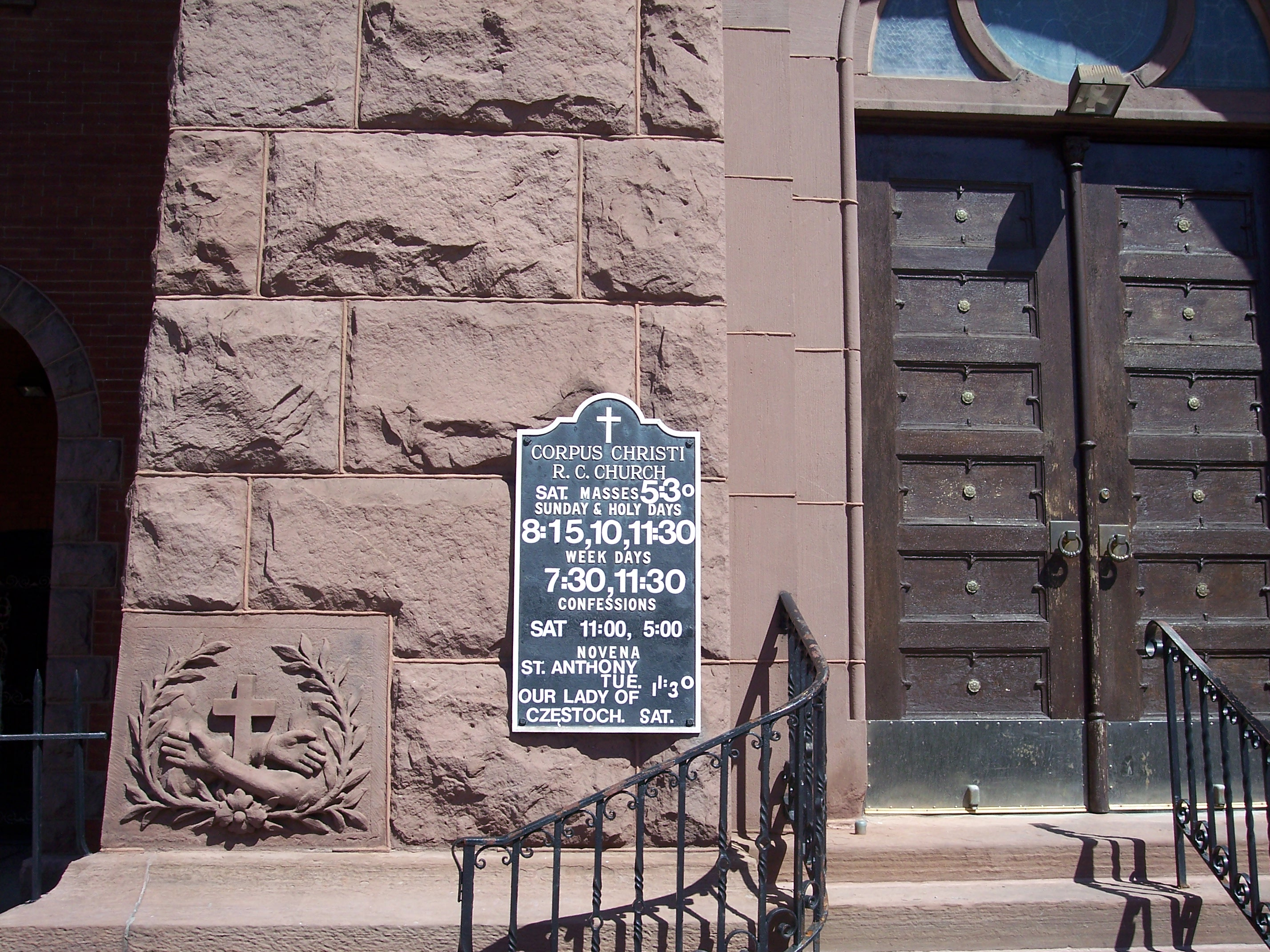
Sign to the left of the front entrance

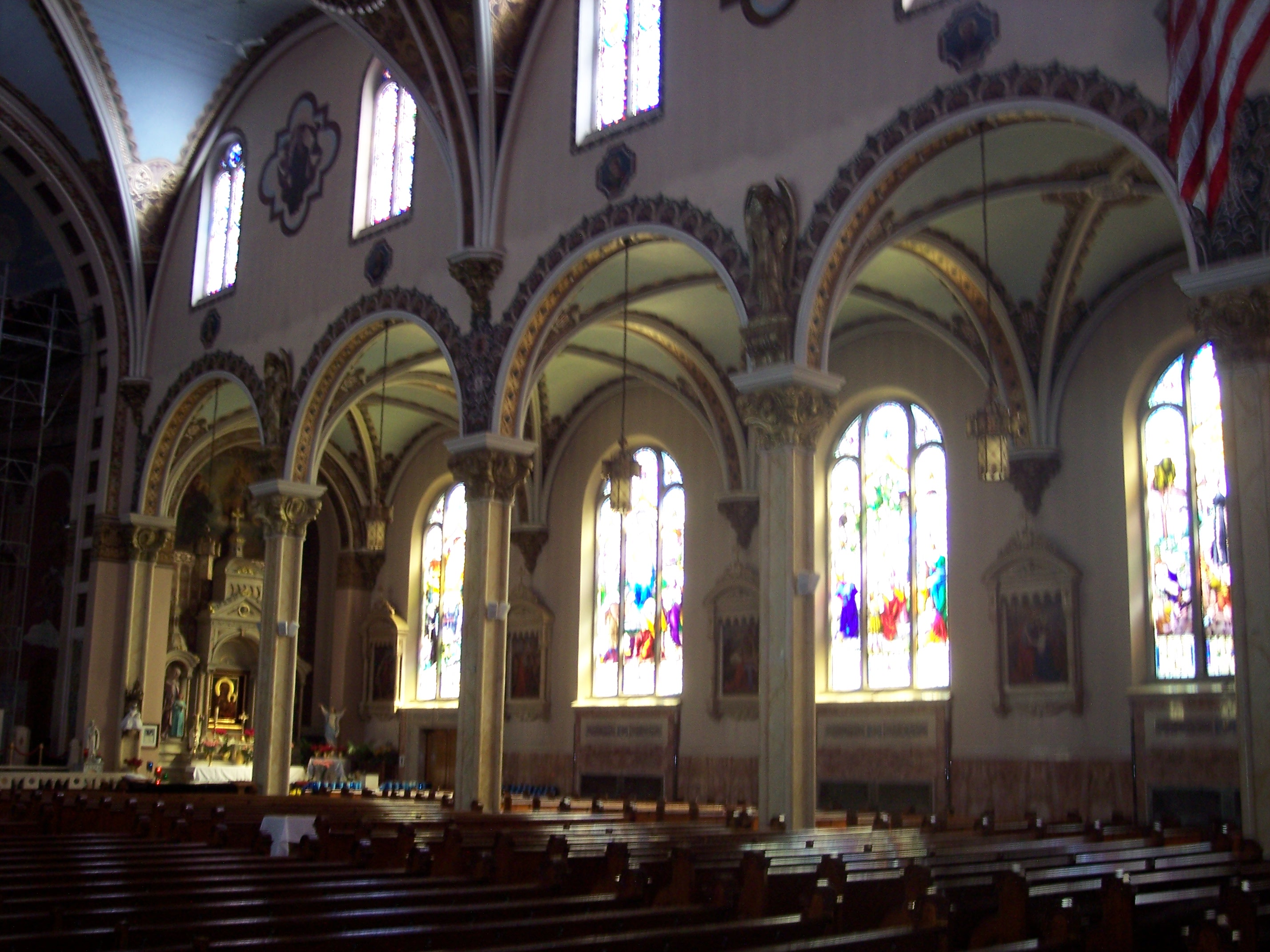

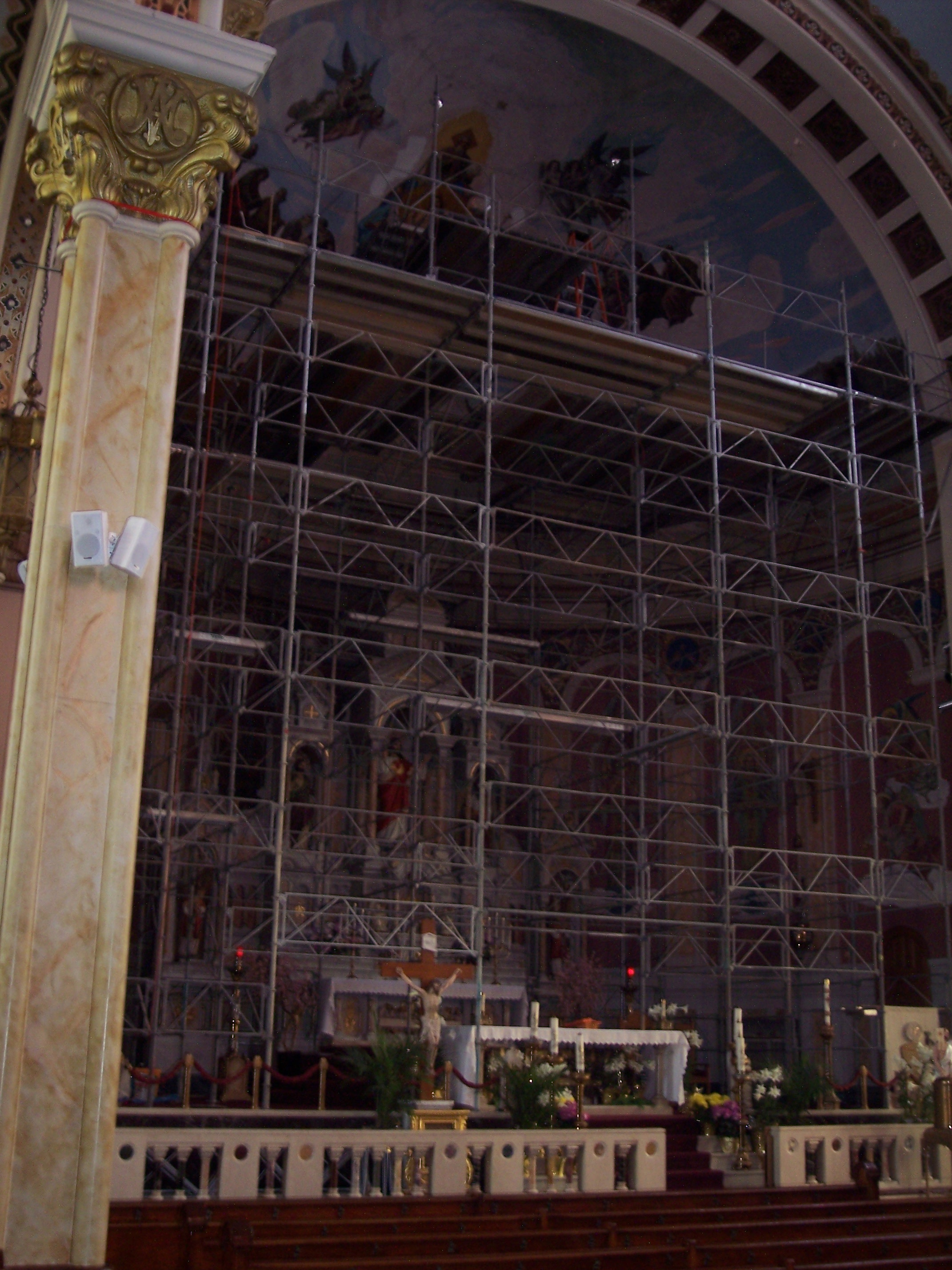
Scaffolding for renovation (May 2011)

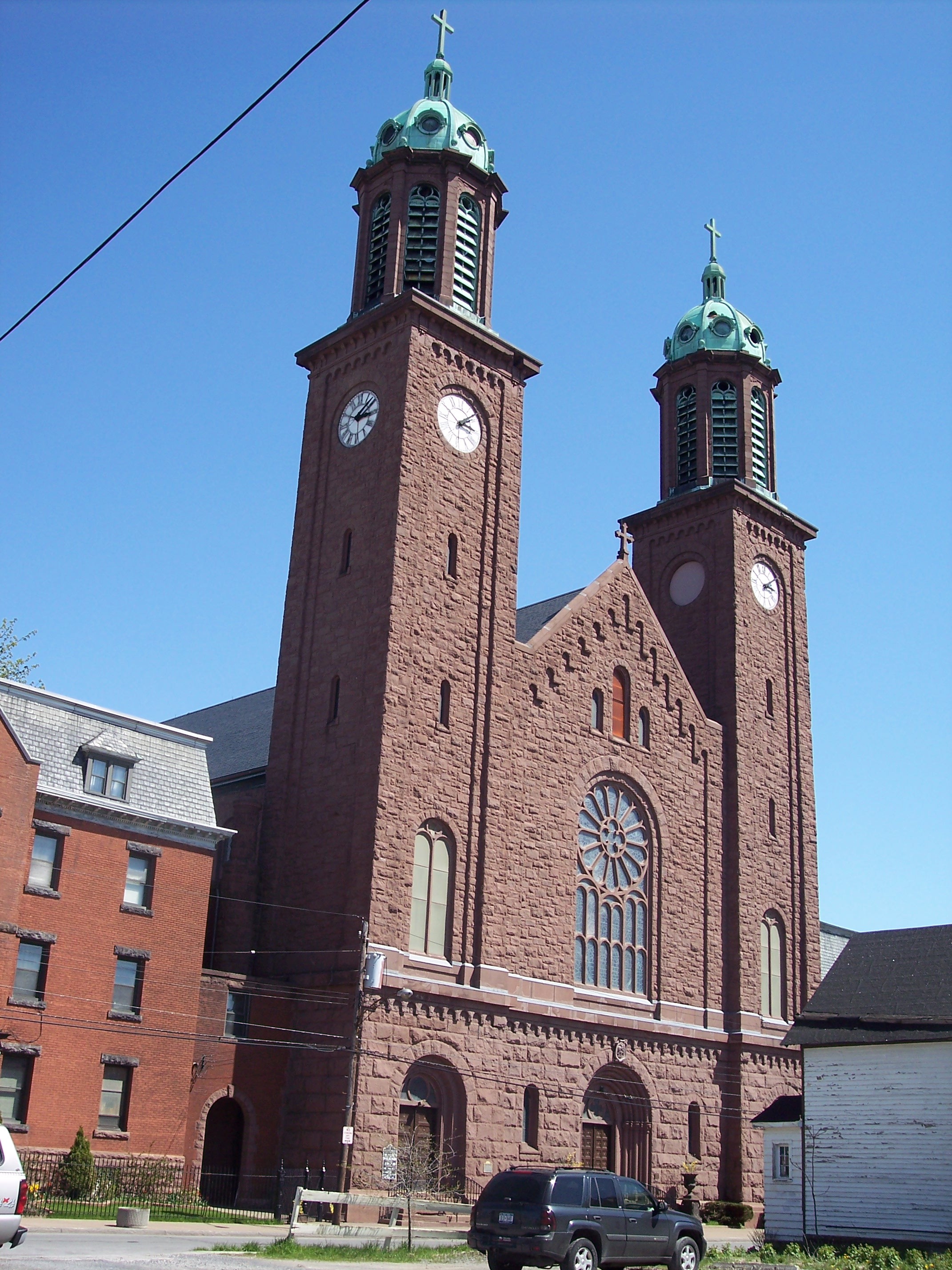
Front view
