= Adam Mickiewicz Library and Dramatic Circle =

Library in Buffalo, New York

Coordinates: 42.890163°N 78.839436°W

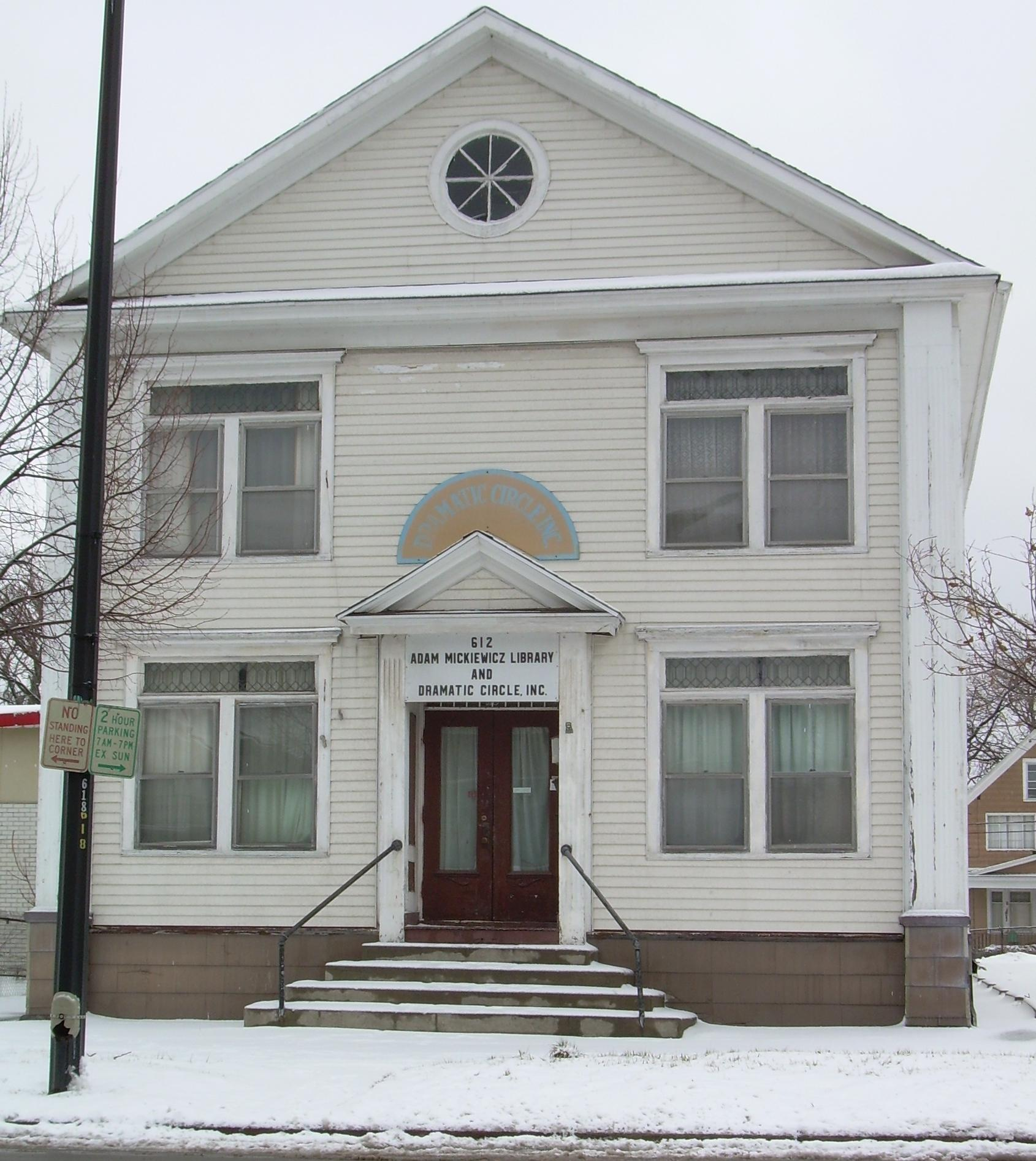
The Adam Mickiewicz Library and Dramatic Circle at 612 Fillmore Ave in Buffalo, NY.

The Adam Mickiewicz Library and Dramatic Circle is a non-profit membership-based organization founded in 1895. It is the oldest Polish American organization in Western New York and is the oldest surviving Polish library in Buffalo. The library holds approximately 12,000 volumes with 400 hand copied plays. The bar serves over 50 different imported beers with a large Polish selection. The "Circle" is home to most of Torn Space Theater's productions and a large annual Dyngus Day party, as well as other cultural events.

== See also ==
- Buffalo, New York
- East Side, Buffalo
- Adam Mickiewicz
