= East Side, Buffalo =

Neighborhood of Buffalo, New York, United States

Coordinates: 42°54′N 78°50′W

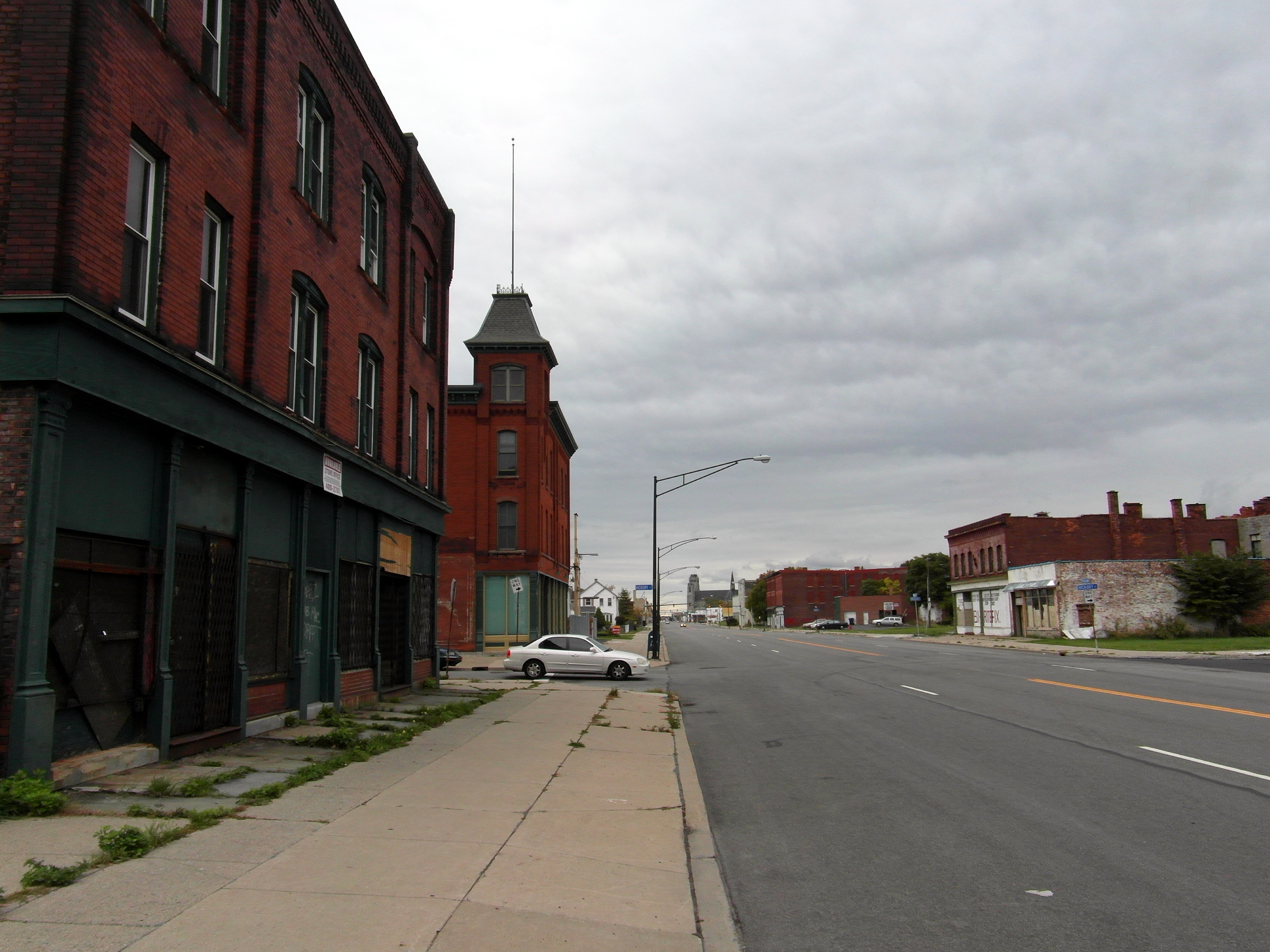
East Side in 2012

The East Side of Buffalo, New York, is one of the city's largest neighborhoods, featuring businesses as well as residences. As of 2025, it also has many vacant lots and abandoned buildings.

It is bordered by Main Street to the north and west, I-190 and the Kaisertown neighborhood to the south, and the town of Cheektowaga to the east. Large, ornate 19th-century churches, most of them Roman Catholic, and modest 1 1/2-story wood-frame cottages, often with progressively smaller rear additions that give a telescoping effect, characterize the district. The East Side was once the second largest Polish-American community in the United States. Jefferson Avenue, and the intersection of Broadway and Fillmore, serve as its most heavily used commercial districts.

Within the East Side are several smaller communities, including the Lovejoy District in the east and Broadway-Fillmore.

Deindustrialization and white flight in the second half of the twentieth century changed the East Side more than other Buffalo neighborhoods; much of the Polish community moved to Cheektowaga in that time frame. The current ethnic composition of the East Side is predominantly black. A disproportionate number of the city's vacant and abandoned houses are located here, as are many acres of urban prairie. Buffalo ReUse was founded as a deconstruction firm that dismantled the city's abandoned properties and provided jobs for East Side residents. Although the Buffalo neighborhood changed more than others, there is still a sense of community through local churches and markets.

Notable destinations include the Broadway Market, Church of Sy. Stanislaus, St. John Kanty's R.C. Church, St. Adalbert's Basilica, Corpus Christi R. C. Church Complex, Buffalo Central Terminal, the Adam Mickiewicz Library and Dramatic Circle, and the Matt Urban Human Services Center.

War Memorial Stadium was formerly part of the neighborhood, and was home of the Buffalo Bills from 1960 to 1972. The site is now home to the Johnnie B. Wiley Amateur Athletic Sports Pavilion.

== See also ==
- Glenny Drive Apartments
- Jozef Mazur
- Matt Urban
- Neighborhoods of Buffalo, New York
