= Daniel Cyganowski =

American bishop of the Polish National Catholic Church

Daniel F. Cyganowski (July 6, 1921 – March 3, 1983) was a bishop of the Buffalo-Pittsburgh Diocese Polish National Catholic Church. He was born in East Chicago, Indiana and graduated from Savonarola Theological Seminary in Scranton, Pennsylvania. Cyganowski served parishes in Pennsylvania, Illinois, and Indiana and was diocesan bishop from 1971 to 1977. He received the Am-Pol Eagle Citizen of the Year Award for civic leadership in 1975.
