= Dorothy Gladys Spicer =

American folklorist

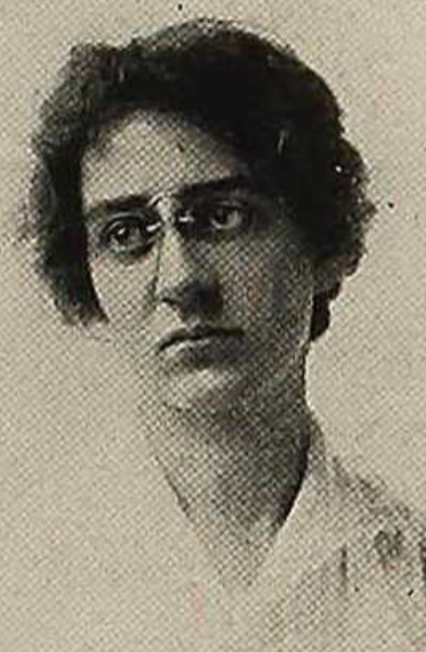
- Dorothy Gladys Spicer, from the 1916 yearbook of Vassar College
- Born: November 3, 1893; Staten Island, New York
- Died: January 25, 1975 (age 81); White Plains, New York
- Other names: Gladys Spicer Fraser
- Occupation(s): Folklorist, writer

Dorothy Gladys Spicer (November 3, 1893 – January 25, 1975), also known as Gladys Spicer Fraser, was an American folklorist and writer.

== Early life and education ==
Spicer was born in Staten Island, New York, the daughter of Jacob Lindley Spicer and Phoebe Bryan Washburn Spicer. Her father was a Quaker field secretary and police chaplin, and her mother was a registered nurse. She graduated from Vassar College in 1916. She earned a master's degree from Radcliffe College.

== Career ==
Spicer was on the staff of the national board of the YWCA. In 1943, she was named nationality communities secretary of the YWCA, responsible for outreach to immigrant groups. She organized classes about American cookery and gave presentations to community groups about ethnic customs and celebrations, based on her research and travels in Europe. She was art adviser to the Utica Festival of Arts and Crafts in 1938, and advised the New Jersey State Museum on an exhibit of Latin American arts and crafts.

She was a full-time writer after midlife, with broader travels to China, Ceylon, and the Middle East. "Once you become a sleuth in such matters, each hour is an adventure, each day a journey into the unknown," she explained to a reporter in 1960.

== Publications ==
In addition to her books on folk customs for adults, Spicer wrote cookbooks, fiction, and a series of story collections for children, with the matching titles 13 Monsters, 13 Witches (1963), 13 Ghosts (1965), 13 Giants (1966), 13 Devils (1967), 13 Goblins, 13 Rascals, and 13 Dragons (1974). She wrote classroom plays, including The Song of the Coffee Bird (1932) for a curriculum package distributed by the Bureau of Coffee Information.

- Folk Festivals and the Foreign Community (1923)
- "Health Practices and Beliefs of the Immigrant Mother as Seen by a Social Worker" (1926)
- Holiday Parties (1939)
- Parties for young Americans (1940)
- Latin American costumes (1941, with Yolanda Bartas and André Gloeckner)
- Windows Open to the World: a Handbook of World Fellowship Projects (1946)
- From an English Oven--Cakes, Buns and Breads of County Tradition (1948)
- Folk Party Fun (1954)
- Yearbook of English festivals (1954)
- Festivals of Western Europe (1958)
- Feast-Day Cakes from Many Lands (1960)
- 46 Days of Christmas (1960)
- The Book of Festivals (1937)
- The Owl's Nest: Folktales from Friesland (1968, with illustrations by Alice Wadowski-Bak)
- Long Ago in Serbia (1968, with Linda Ominsky)
- The Humming Top (1968)
- The kneeling tree, and other folktales from the Middle East (1971)
- The Crystal Ball (1975, novel)

== Personal life ==
Spicer married Malcolm Charles Fraser in 1925; they divorced in 1927. She died in 1975, at the age of 81, in White Plains, New York.
