= Alice Wadowski =

Polish-American artist

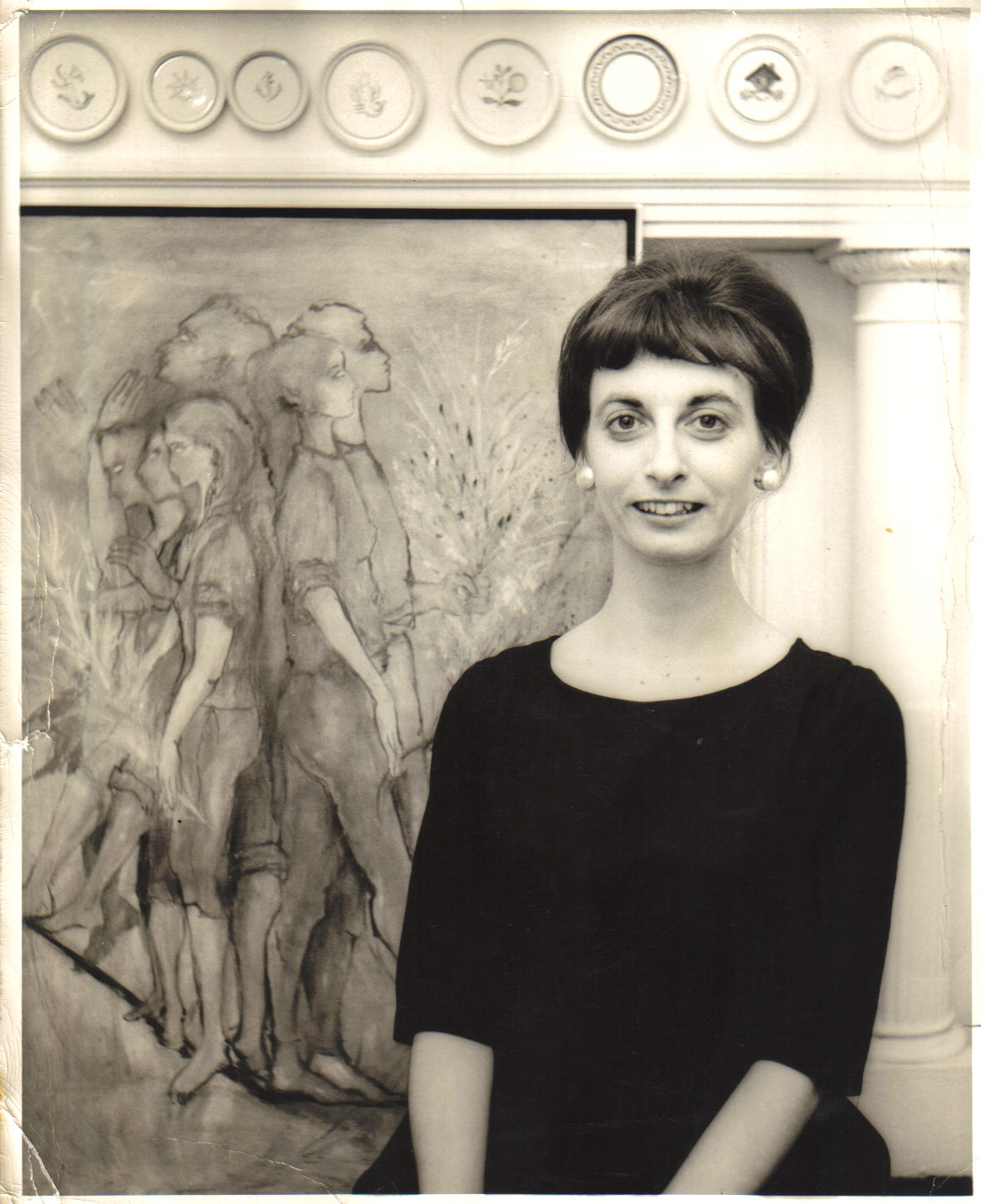
- Alice Wadowski-Bak at an art show with her painting, 6 Blind People on a Tight Rope, in the background
- Born: Alice T. Wadowski; August 8, 1935; Niagara Falls, New York
- Died: June 14, 2008 (aged 72); Niagara Falls, New York
- Known for: Painter
- Notable work: Wigilia, Sleeping Beauty, Broadway-Fillmore (1982)
- Awards: Am-Pol Eagle Citizen of the Year Award

Alice T. Wadowski-Bak (August 8, 1935 – June 14, 2008) was a noted Polish-American artist and creator of wycinanki (paper-cutting). Her work has been exhibited at the Albright Knox in Buffalo, the Boston Institute of Contemporary Art, and the Pittsburgh Center for the Arts.

== Life ==
Trained in Buffalo, New York, Bak's art caught the eye of Eugene Dyczkowski, the president of the Buffalo Society of Artists, founder of the Polish Arts Club of Buffalo, and esteemed artist. He offered her a scholarship, which she was not able to accept. She attended Syracuse University for her master's in fine art, and completed her studies at the University at Buffalo. She moved to New York City and worked as a book illustrator and fabric designer.

Bak was Caroline Kennedy's art instructor in the 1960s. Vincent Price was a fan of her artwork. Bak, a devout Catholic, created a painting that was presented to Pope John Paul II, and hangs in the Vatican on permanent exhibition.

After working in New York City, Bak returned to Niagara Falls. She worked with the Polish School at Holy Trinity Church.

In 1996, she won the Am-Pol Eagle Citizen of the Year Award for Media.

On June 14, 2008, Wadowski-Bak died. She was interred at Holy Trinity Cemetery, Lewiston, New York.

Works

- Wigilia
- Sleeping Beauty
- Broadway-Fillmore (1982)

Book illustrations

- Polish Folklore and Myth by Joanne Asala
- Polish Proverbs by Joanne Asala
- The Owl's Nest: Folk Tales from Friesland by Dorothy Gladys Spicer
