= Jean Wactawski-Wende =

American epidemiologist

- Awards: Am-Pol Eagle Citizen of the Year Award (2013)

Academic background
- Education: BA, Biology, 1981, Canisius College; MS, Natural Sciences, 1983, PhD, Experimental Pathology, 1989, University at Buffalo
- Thesis: Factors influencing second cancer risk and death in 5-year survivors of cervical cancer (1989)

Jean Wactawski-Wende is an American epidemiologist specializing in women's health. She is a Full professor of epidemiology and environmental health, and dean of the University at Buffalo's School of Public Health and Health Professions.

During the COVID-19 pandemic, Wactawski-Wende was the recipient of the 2020 UB President's Medal which recognizes "outstanding scholarly or artistic achievements, humanitarian acts, contributions of time or treasure, exemplary leadership or any other major contribution to the development of the University at Buffalo and the quality of life in the UB community."

== Early life and education ==
Wactawski-Wende was born in a Polish household. She completed her bachelor's degree in biology from Canisius College in 1981 and her graduate degrees at the University at Buffalo (UB).

== Career ==
After spending five years as a research scientist at the Roswell Park Comprehensive Cancer Center Wactawski-Wende joined the faculty at her alma mater, the University at Buffalo, as an assistant professor. She had originally joined the Department of Gynecology-Obstetrics but later joined the Department of Social and Preventive Medicine. In 1993, she was part of the team that spearheaded UB's successful bid to become one of the federally funded study's 16 original vanguard clinical centers.

In 2011, UB recognized Wactawski-Wende with their Distinguished Biomedical Alumna Award for being a "nationally recognized epidemiologist who has played a leading role in the Women’s Health Initiative (WHI), a landmark study that has changed the understanding of health in postmenopausal women." Following this, she was the recipient of the 2013 Am-Pol Eagle Citizen of the Year Award in the Health and Medicine category. As a result of her research, Wactawski-Wende was appointed dean of the School of Public Health and Health Professions after a national search in 2015. She was also promoted to the rank of Distinguished Professor, the highest faculty rank in the SUNY system. While serving in the role of dean, she accepted the 2015 Association for Clinical and Translational Science Team Science Award on behalf of the Women's Health Initiative which "acknowledges and recognizes the growing importance of interdisciplinary teams to the translation of research discoveries into clinical applications and eventually widespread clinical practice."

During the COVID-19 pandemic, Wactawski-Wende was the recipient of the 2020 UB President's Medal which recognizes "outstanding scholarly or artistic achievements, humanitarian acts, contributions of time or treasure, exemplary leadership or any other major contribution to the development of the University at Buffalo and the quality of life in the UB community."
