= Jozef Mazur =

American painter (1897–1970)

Jozef C. Mazur
- Born: Jozef C. Mazur; March 17, 1897; Buffalo, New York, United States
- Died: April 23, 1970 (aged 73); Buffalo, New York, United States
- Known for: Painter, stained glass

Jozef C. Mazur (March 17, 1897 – April 23, 1970) was an American stained-glass artist, painter and sculptor. His works can be found signed as Josef Mazur, Joseph Mazur, Joe Mazur, J. C. Mazur, and a few others.

== Life and career ==
Mazur was born to a Galician family in 1897. He studied at the Albright Art School in Buffalo and at the Art Students League of New York. He worked in a variety of media. His stained glass works can be found in churches in Philadelphia, New York City and Buffalo.

Before he was 30, Mazur distinguished himself as an ecclesiastical painter in this area. His first commission was the complete decoration of St. Stanislaus Church in Buffalo. His paintings can also be found in St. Adalbert's Basilica, Blessed Trinity, the Polish National Cathedral Holy Mother of the Rosary, St. John Gualbert's, and Villa Maria Academy. He executed murals at Holy Trinity in Niagara Falls, statuary for St. Aloysius in Springville, and stained glass windows for St. Barbara in Lackawanna. Mazur also painted many churches outside of Western New York, including Rochester, New York; Chicago, Illinois; Detroit, Michigan, Adams, Massachusetts; New Haven, Connecticut; and Trenton and Perth Amboy in New Jersey. Churches that feature his stained glass include Saint John Kanty Roman Catholic Church and SS. Rita & Patrick's Church in Buffalo, as well as Our Lady of Czestochowa Church in North Tonawanda. Mazur's secular works include the sculpted bust of Frédéric Chopin, a life-size portrait of Kazimierz Pulaski in Olean, and interior decoration at the UB Main Street Campus.

=== University at Buffalo's Polish Room ===
In 1955, Mazur donated a four-panel stained glass chandelier depicting Frédéric Chopin, Adam Mickiewicz, Juliusz Słowacki, and Ignacy Paderewski to the Polish Room. He also donated four stained glass window medallions, of Marie Curie, Nicolaus Copernicus, Casimir Pulaski, and Tadeusz Kościuszko. Some time before 1978, the four window hangs went missing, of which only Curie's has been recovered.
