= Louis F. Dlugosz =

American sculptor

Louis Frank Dlugosz (1915–2002) was an American sculptor-steelworker of Polish descent. His only formal art training was at the old Art Institute of Buffalo.

== Early life and military service ==
Dlugosz was born November 21, 1915, in Lackawanna, Pennsylvania. On October 16, 1940, he joined the United States Army and was assigned to the 106th Field Artillery Regiment at Fort McClellan, Anniston, Alabama. He was later stationed in Buckinghamshire, England and designed scale models of the beaches in preparation for the Normandy landings. In August 1942, he was transferred to the Army Corps of Engineers as an aerial photographer. He worked with the "Monuments Men" to assess damage of cultural sites in Darmstadt, Germany.

== Career ==
After serving in the Army, he returned home and launched his career. Using his "pretzel-bending" technique, Dlugosz rolled clay into strips and bent them together for a lattice-work effect, resulting in sculpture with an open rather than a solid interior His work was exhibited at the Metropolitan Museum of Art in New York City, the École nationale supérieure des beaux-arts and the Louvre in Paris. In 1982, his bust of Lech Wałęsa—surrounded by bars because the Polish labor leader was jailed by the Communist regime—was blessed by Pope John Paul II in the Vatican. A bust of kidnapped American reporter (Batavia, New York native) Terry Anderson in chains was displayed in a downtown Batavia New York Mall until his release from a Lebanese prison. The chains were smashed by Anderson during a visit to his hometown. The Louis Dlugosz Papers are held at Syracuse University.

== later life ==
He died January 17, 2002.
