= St. Adalbert's Basilica, Buffalo =

Saint Adalbert Basilica
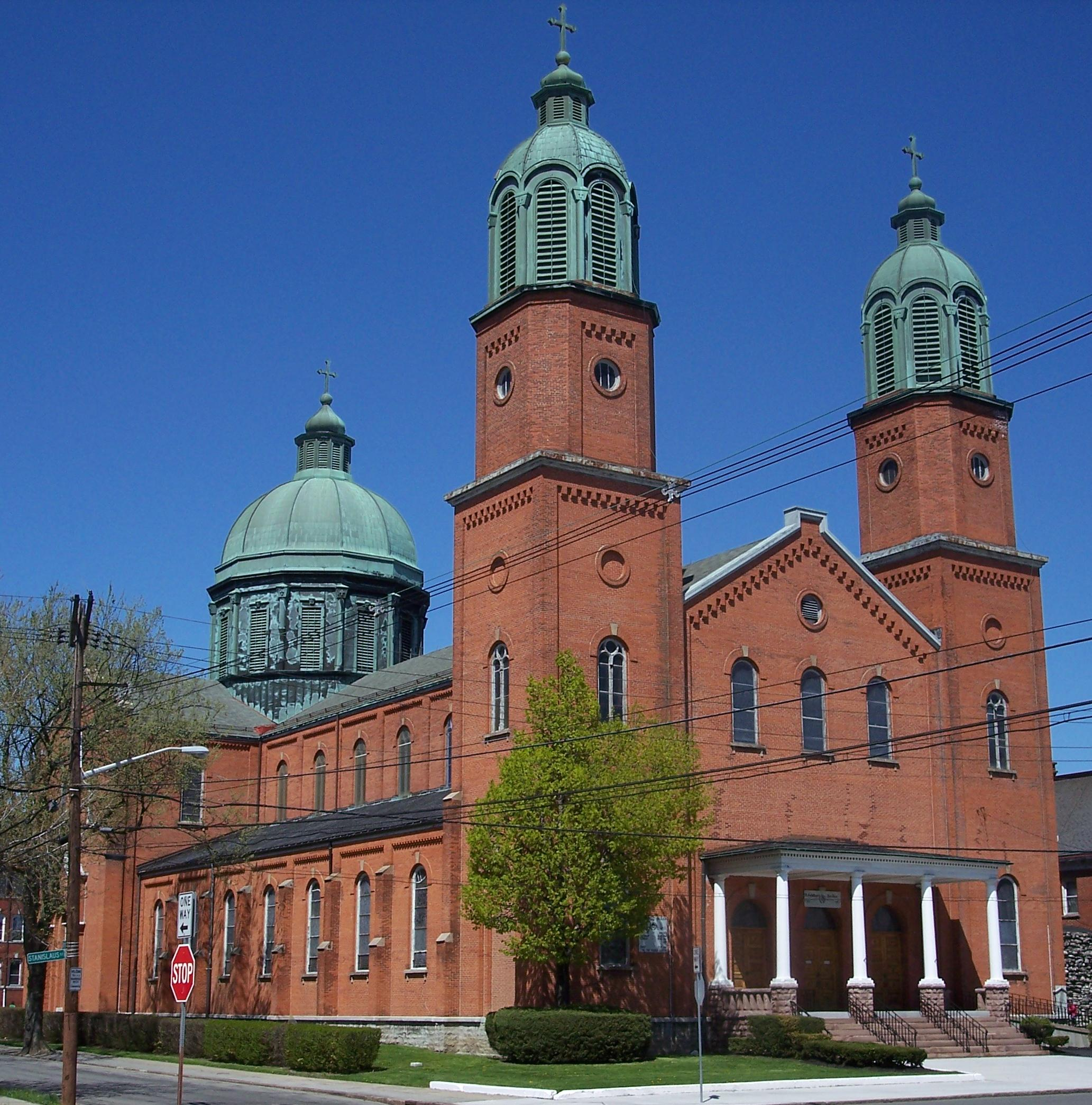
- Saint Adalbert Basilica
- 42.8972759°N 78.8311436°W
- Location: 212 Stanislaus Street, Buffalo, New York
- Country: United States
- Denomination: Roman Catholic
- Website: saintadalbertbasilica.org

History
- Status: Parish church
- Founded: 1886

Architecture
- Functional status: Active
- Architect: Raymond Huber
- Style: Romanesque
- Completed: 1890
- Construction cost: US$63,000

Specifications
- Length: 240 feet (73.2 m)
- Width: 118 feet (36.0 m)
- Height: 151 feet (46.0 m)
- Materials: Brick

Clergy
- Pastor: Rev. James Monaco

Saint Adalbert Basilica (referred to in Polish as Bazylika Swietego Wojciecha) is a historic Roman Catholic church located on Buffalo, New York's East Side within the Diocese of Buffalo. It is a prime example of the Polish Cathedral style of church architecture in both its opulence and grand scale.

A rare designation bestowed on the parish occurred in 1907, when the Vatican proclaimed St. Adalbert a basilica, the first in the US. The proclamation, as well as its English translation, can be viewed in the basilica's museum room.

== History ==
Built by Huber and Company in 1890, it was built by Polish immigrants. The building itself is brick. It is 240 feet (73 m) long, 118 feet (36 m) wide, and the nave is 70 feet (21 m) high. The two towers are 150 feet (46 m), high with a dome 40 feet (12 m) wide and soaring 125 feet (38 m) above the main nave. When it was built, it was the largest church in Western New York, and cost $63,000 without the furnishings. The 36 stained glass windows of the basilica were produced by Franz Mayer & Co. of Munich, Germany. The interior was decorated by Jozef Mazur.

== Community ==
The St. Adalbert's Response to Love Center, run by Sister Mary Johnice, is located next to the Basilica and provides services for the poor of Buffalo, such as hot meals, a food pantry, toys and clothing for children, GED classes, and basic career-related computer training. In 2016, St. Adalbert's former rectory was transformed into the Mother Teresa Home, a haven for pregnant women operated by the Diocesen Office of Pro-Life Activities.

== Current status ==
The last mass was scheduled for November 25, 2007, but had been put on hold due to the parish having filed an appeal to the Vatican. In February 2008, the Vatican's highest Canonical Court upheld Bishop Edward Kmiec's decision to close the church. An appeal was made by the "Save St. Adalbert" committee, and the process was delayed. Again revisited, the Vatican Congregation for the Clergy has upheld the decision to merge St. Adalbert Parish into St. John Kanty Parish, with St. Adalbert's remaining open for worship. The final weekly Mass at St. Adalbert's was celebrated on September 18, 2011, marking the end of the year-long observance of the 125th anniversary of the parish. St. Adalbert Basilica remains open to this day for four yearly special masses plus weddings, funerals, baptisms, tours, and other occasions.

== Gallery ==
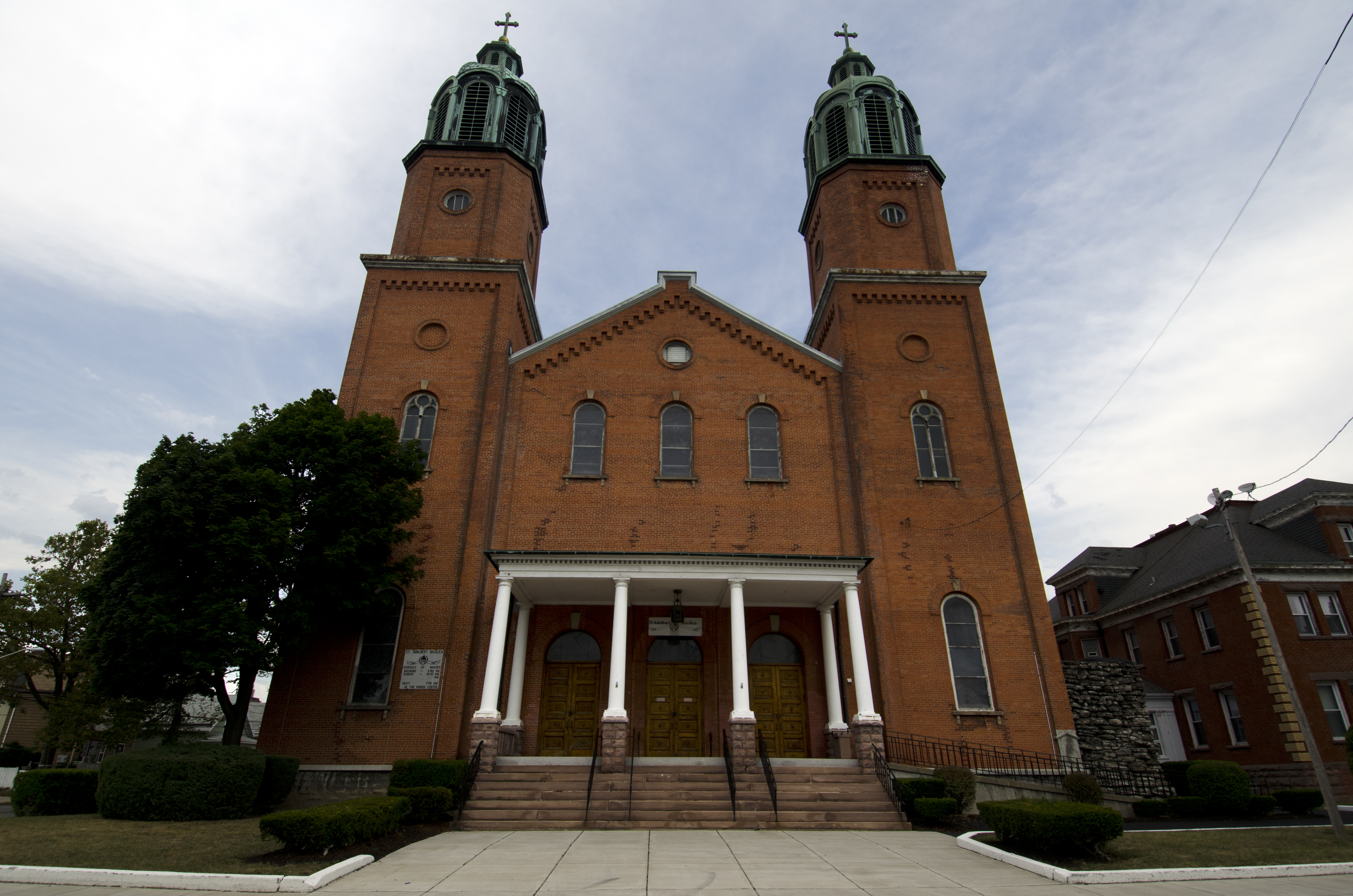
Saint Adalbert Basilica

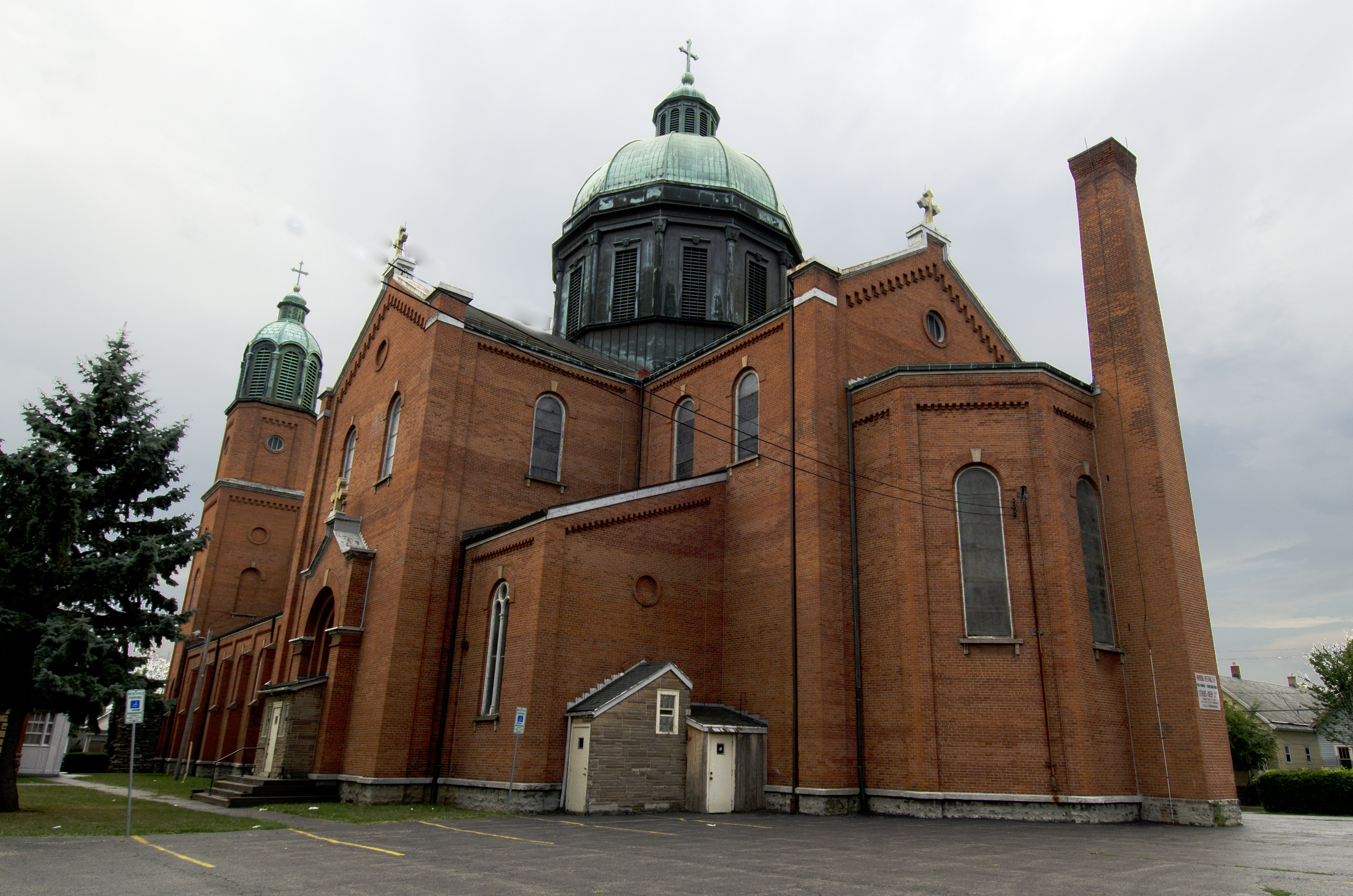
Saint Adalbert Basilica, rear view

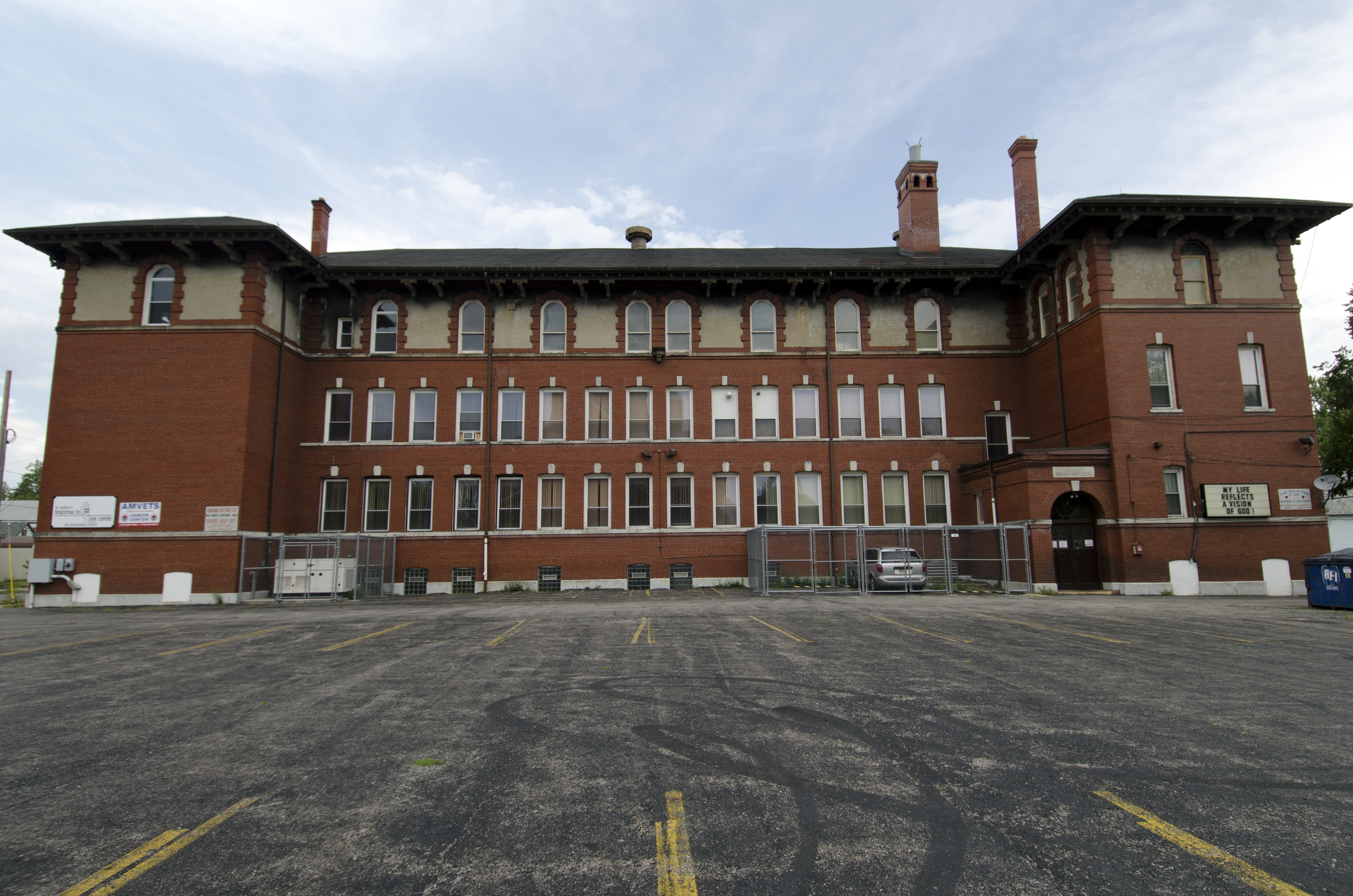
Former school at Saint Adalbert Basilica

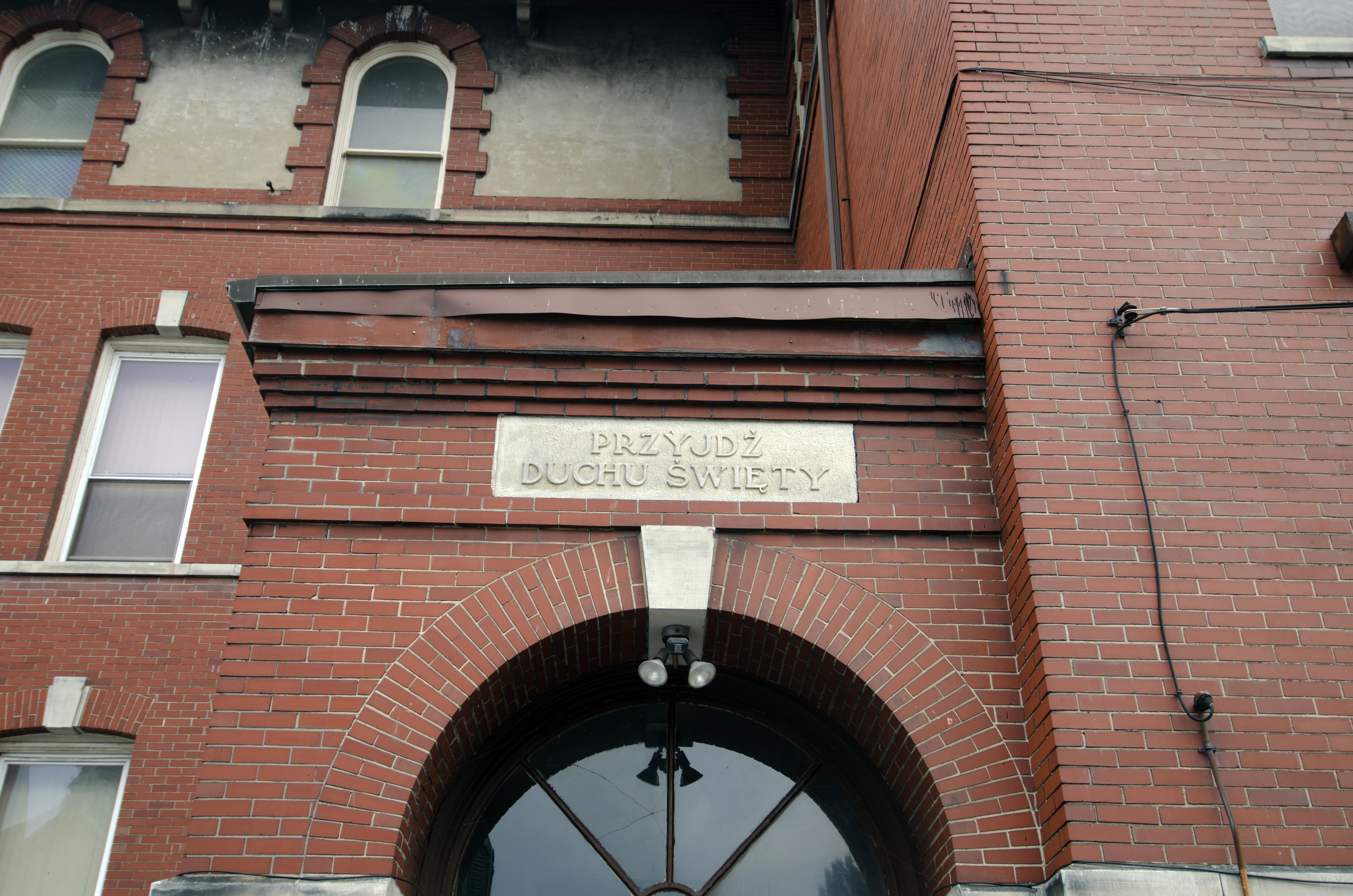
Inscription over door of former school at Saint Adalbert Basilica: "Come, Holy Spirit."

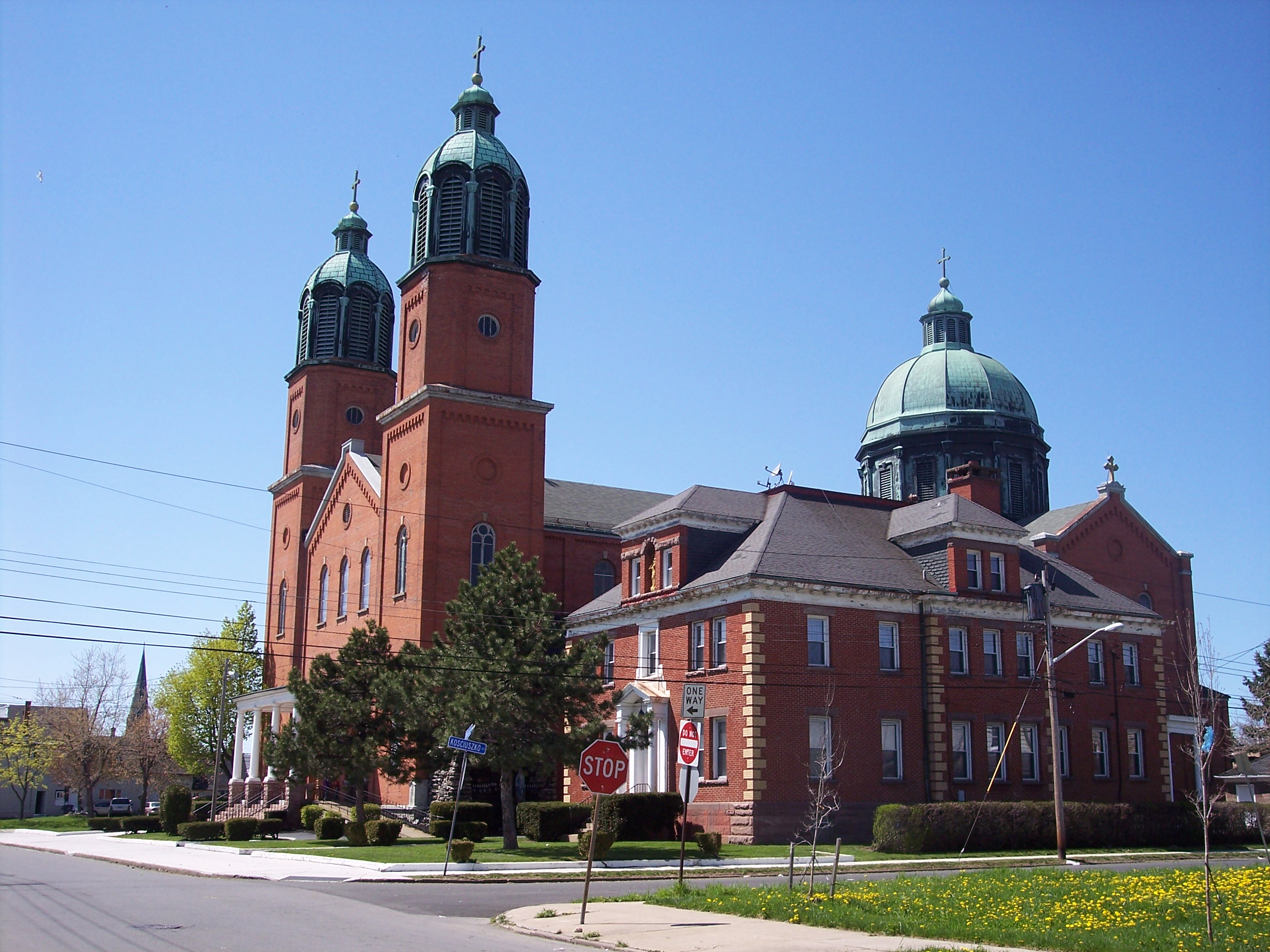

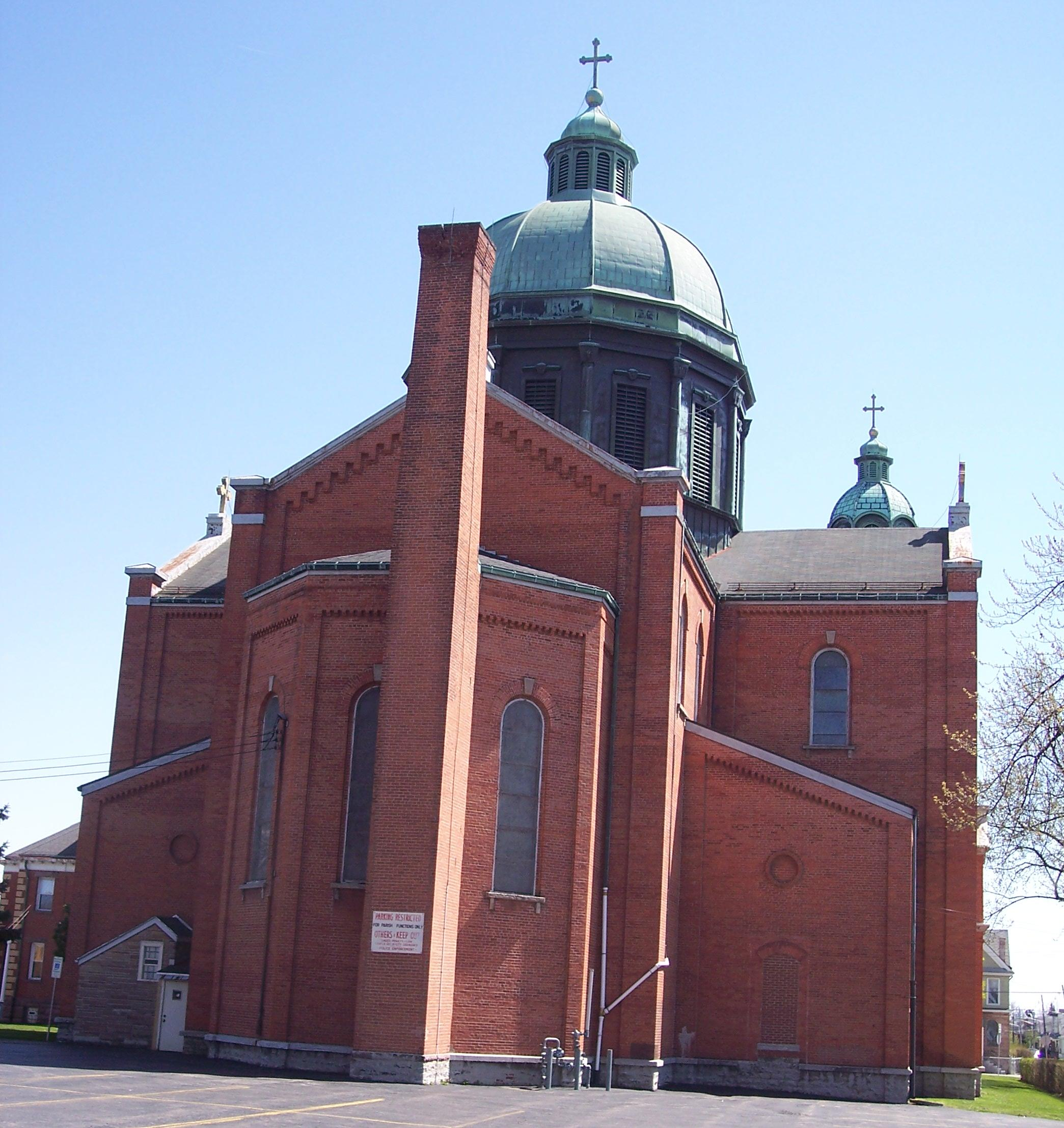
Rear of the church

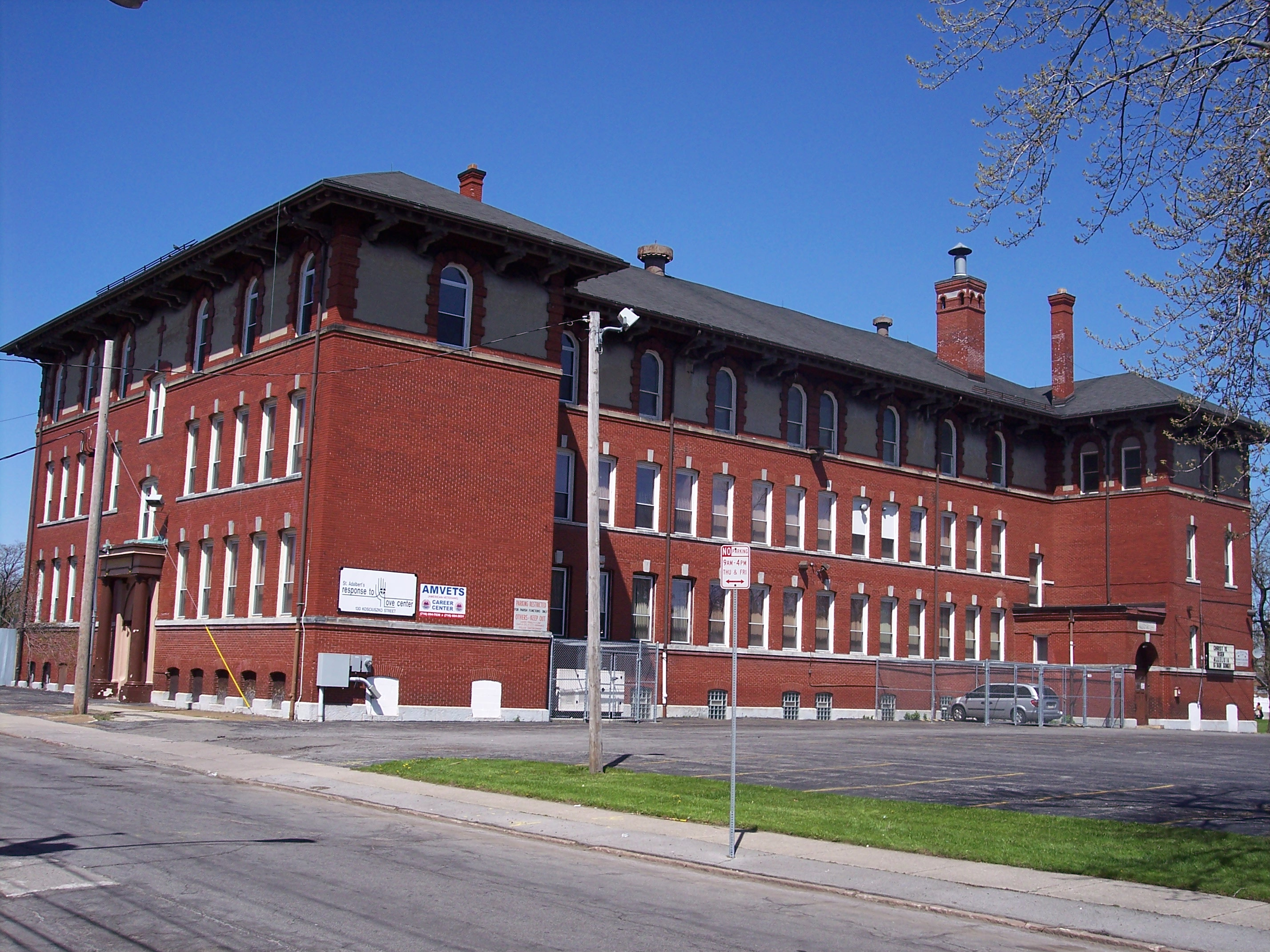
Response to Love Center (behind church)

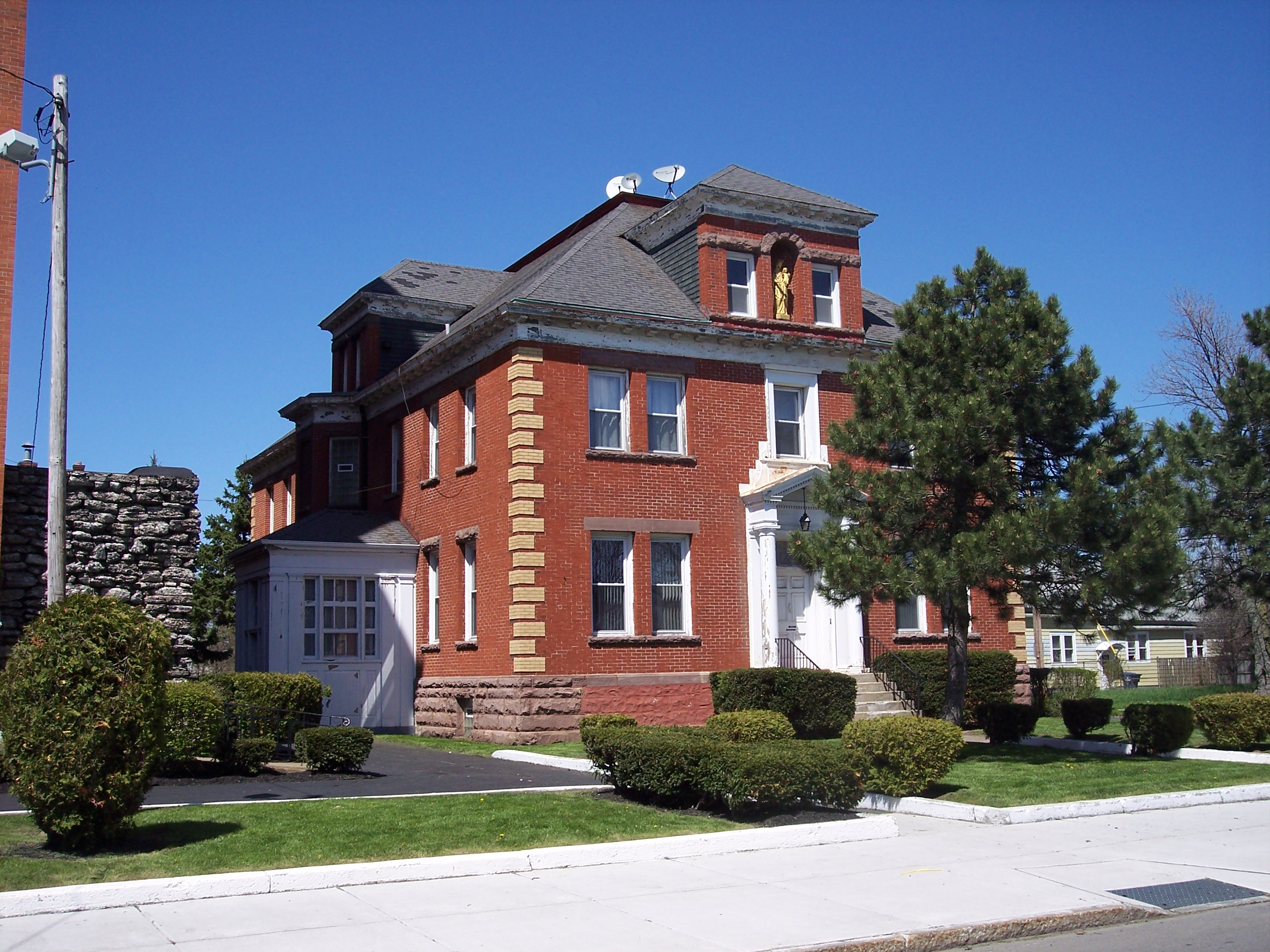
Rectory

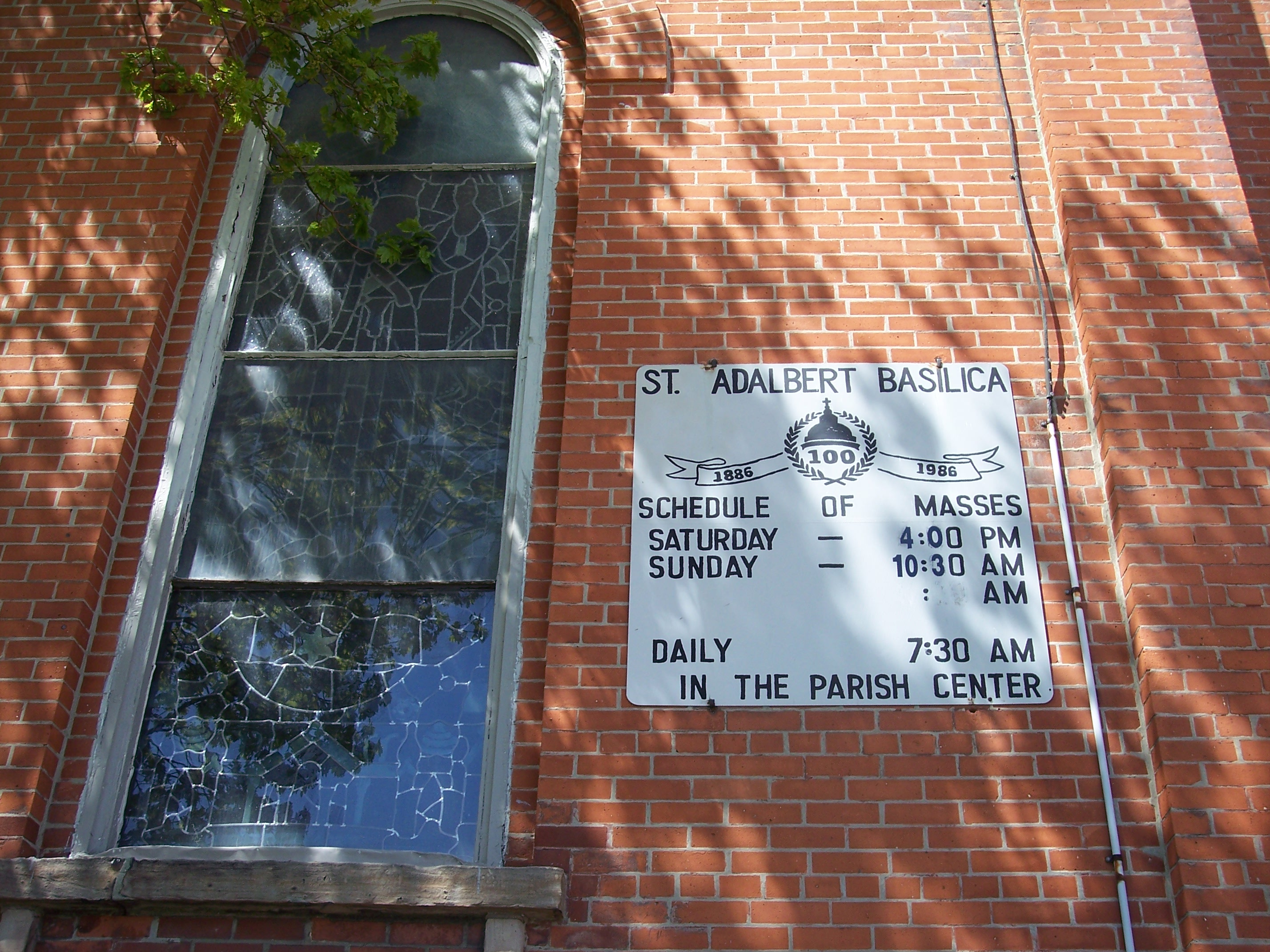
Sign to the left of the front entrance
