= List of churches in the Archdiocese of Chicago =

The Catholic Church of Chicago, 1876

This is a list of current and former Catholic churches in the Archdiocese of Chicago. The archdiocese covers Cook and Lake Counties and is organized for administrative purposes into six vicariates as follows:

- Vicariate I: Lake County and northern Cook County (including Des Plaines, Mount Prospect, Schaumburg, and Waukegan)
- Vicariate II: Chicago and Lakeshore north (including Chicago, Evanston, Skokie, and Winnetka)
- Vicariate III: Central Chicago
- Vicariate IV: West Cook County (including Chicago, Cicero, Melrose Park, and Oak Park)
- Vicariate V: South and southwest Cook County (including Chicago, Lemont, Oak Lawn, and Orland Park)
- Vicariate VI: South and southeast Cook County (including south Chicago, Blue Island, and Harvey)

== Vicariate I ==
Vicariate I covers the northern portion of the archdiocese, covers Lake County and portions of Cook County. It includes the communities of Des Plaines, Elk Grove Village, Lake Forest, Mount Prospect, Mundelein, Schaumburg, and Waukegan. A list of churches in these communities is found at List of churches in the Roman Catholic Archdiocese of Chicago – Vicariate I.

== Vicariate II ==
=== Deanery A: Evanston and Skokie ===
Name	Image	Location	Description/sources
St. Athanasius		1615 Lincoln St, Evanston	Established in 1921; current Gothic church dedicated in 1937 Became part of the new St. John Newman Parish in 2022
St. Joan of Arc		9248 N Lawndale Ave, Evanston	Established in 1951 Became part of the new St. John Newman Parish in 2022
St. Mary		1012 Lake St, Evanston	Established in 1865 Became part of the new St. John XXIII Parish in 2022
St. Nicholas		806 Ridge Ave, Evanston	Established in 1887; current church building opened in 1906 Became part of the new St. John XXIII Parish in 2022
St. Philip the Apostle		1962 Old Willow Rd, Northfield	Became part of the new Divine Mercy Parish in 2018
St. Lambert		8148 Karlov Ave, Skokie	Dedicated in 1961
St. Peter		8100 Niles Center Rd, Skokie	
St. Francis Xavier		524 9th St, Wilmette	Established in 1904
St. Joseph		1747 Lake Ave, Wilmette	Established in 1845
Sacred Heart		1077 Tower Rd, Winnetka	Became part of the new Divine Mercy Parish in 2018
Ss. Faith, Hope, and Charity		191 Linden St, Winnetka	Established in 1936, though Protestant city leaders fought legal battle to prevent construction of church; church ultimately built and dedicated in 1962

=== Deanery B: Chicago ===
Name	Image	Location	Description/sources
Blessed Alojzije Stepinac		6346 N Ridge Ave, Chicago	Croatian Catholic mission established in 1972; formerly St. Henry parish church built in 1906
St. Gertrude		6200 N Glenwood Ave, Chicago	Parish founded in 1912; current church dedicated in 1931
St. Gregory the Great		5545 N Paulina St, Chicago	Founded in 1904
St. Henry		6325 N Hoyne Ave, Chicago	Founded in 1851, closed in 2021
St. Ignatius		6559 N Glenwood Ave, Chicago	Founded in 1906, closed in 2021
St. Jerome		1709 W Lunt Ave, Chicago	Founded in 1895
St. Margaret Mary		2324 W Chase Ave, Chicago	Founded in 1921
St. Timothy		6326 N Washtenaw Ave, Chicago	Founded in 1925, closed in 2021

=== Deanery C: Chicago ===
Name	Image	Location	Description/sources
Immaculate Heart of Mary (Irving Park)		3834 N Spaulding Ave, Chicago	Founded in 1912, closed in 2021
Our Lady of Lourdes		4640 N Ashland Ave, Chicago	Founded in 1892, closed in 2024
Our Lady of Mercy		4432 N Troy St, Chicago	
Queen of Angels		2330 W Sunnyside Ave, Chicago	Founded in 1909
Resurrection		3033 N Francisco Ave, Chicago	
Transfiguration of Our Lord		2609 W Carmen Ave, Chicago	Founded in 1911, closed in 2020
St. Andrew		3546 N Paulina St, Chicago	
St. Benedict		2215 W Irving Park Rd, Chicago	
St. Edward		4350 W Sunnyside Ave, Chicago	
St. Hilary		5601 N California Ave, Chicago	Founded in 1926
St. Ita		1220 W Catalpa Ave, Chicago	Founded in 1900
St. Mary of the Lake		4200 N Sheridan Rd, Chicago	Founded in 1901
St. Matthias		2310 W Ainslie St, Chicago	Founded in 1887, weekly services discontinued in 2021
St. Thomas of Canterbury		4827 N Kenmore Ave, Chicago	Founded in 1916

=== Deanery D: Chicago ===
Name	Image	Location	Description/sources
Assumption		323 W Illinois St, Chicago	
Holy Name Cathedral		735 N State St, Chicago	
Immaculate Conception & St. Joseph (Near North Side)		1107 N Orleans St, Chicago	
Our Lady of Mount Carmel		708 W Belmont Ave, Chicago	
St. Alphonsus		1429 W Wellington Ave, Chicago	
St. Bonaventure Oratory		1641 W Diversey Pkwy, Chicago	Founded in 1911, closed in 2024
St. Clement		642 W Deming Pl, Chicago	
National Shrine of St. Francis Xavier Cabrini		2520 N Lakeview Ave, Chicago	
St. Josaphat		2311 N Southport Ave, Chicago	
St. Michael in Old Town		1633 N Cleveland Ave, Chicago	
St. Teresa of Avila		1033 W Armitage Ave, Chicago	
St. Vincent de Paul		1010 W Webster Ave, Chicago	

=== Deanery E: Niles and Park Ridge ===
Name	Image	Location	Description/sources
Shrine of All Saints		8523 Georgiana Ave, Morton Grove	
Mary, Seat of Wisdom		920 W Granville Rd, Park Ridge	
Our Lady of Hope		9711 W Devon Ave, Des Plaines	
Our Lady of Perpetual Help		1775 Grove St, Glenview	
Our Lady of Ransom		8300 N Greenwood Ave, Niles	
St. Catherine Laboure		3535 Thornwood Ave, Glenview	
St. Isaac Jogues		8149 W Golf Rd, Niles	
St. John Brebeuf		8307 N Harlem Ave, Niles	
St. Martha		8523 Georgiana Ave, Morton Grove	
St. Norbert & Our Lady of the Brook		1809 Walters Ave, Northbrook	
St. Paul of the Cross		320 S Washington St, Park Ridge	

=== Deanery F: Chicago ===
Name	Image	Location	Description/sources
Immaculate Conception (Norwood Park)		7211 W Talcott Ave, Chicago	
Queen of All Saints Basilica		6280 N Sauganash Ave, Chicago	
St. Cornelius		5430 W Foster Ave, Chicago	Founded in 1925, closed in 2021
St. Eugene		7958 W Foster Ave, Chicago	
St. Juliana		7201 N Oketo Ave, Chicago	
St. Mary of the Woods		6955 Hiawatha Ave, Chicago	Founded in 1952 in a storefront on Touhy Ave; first church building was dedicated in 1953, expanded and remodeled in 1966, and partially remodeled again in 2012
St. Monica		5135 N Mont Clare Ave, Chicago	
St. Tarcissus		6030 W Ardmore Ave, Chicago	Parish established in 1926; church dedicated in 1954
St. Thecla		6725 W Devon Ave, Chicago	Founded in 1925, closed in 2021

== Vicariate III ==
=== Deanery A: Chicago ===
Name	Image	Location	Description/sources
Basilica of St. Hyacinth		3635 W George St, Chicago	
Holy Rosary		612 N Western Ave, Chicago	
Maternity BVM		3647 W North Ave, Chicago	Part of San Luis Sanchez del Rio Parish
Our Lady of the Angels Mission Center		3808 W Iowa St, Chicago	
Our Lady of Fatima (Avondale)		3051 N Christiana Ave, Chicago	Founded in 1942, closed in 2020
Our Lady of Grace		2455 N Hamlin Ave, Chicago	
St. John Berchmans		2519 W Logan Blvd, Chicago	
St. Francis of Assisi (Humboldt Park)		932 N Kostner Ave, Chicago	Part of San Jose Luis Sanchez del Rio Parish
St. Mark		1048 N Campbell Ave, Chicago	Founded in 1894, closed in 2022
St. Mary of the Angels		1850 N Hermitage Ave, Chicago	
St. Philomena		1921 N Kedvale Ave, Chicago	Part of San Jose Luiz Sanchez del Rio Parish
St. Sylvester		2157 N Humboldt Blvd, Chicago	

=== Deanery B: Chicago ===
Name	Image	Location	Description/sources
Holy Innocents		743 N Armour St, Chicago	
Holy Trinity		1118 N Noble St, Chicago	Polish mission
St. Aloysius		2300 W LeMoyne St, Chicago	
St. Hedwig's		2136 W Webster Ave, Chicago	
St. Helen		2315 W Augusta Blvd, Chicago	
St. John Cantius		825 N Carpenter St, Chicago	
St. Stanislaus Kostka		1351 W Evergreen Ave, Chicago	
St. Stephen King of Hungary		2015 W Augusta Blvd, Chicago	Hungarian mission since 2021
Santa Maria Addolorata		528 N Ada St, Chicago	Founded in 1903, closed in 2021

=== Deanery C: Chicago ===
Name	Image	Location	Description/sources
All Saints - St. Anthony		518 W 28th Pl, Chicago	Founded in 1913, merged in 1968, closed in 2019
Blessed Sacrament		3745 S Paulina St, Chicago	
Five Holy Martyrs		4327 S Richmond St, Chicago	
Holy Cross		1740 W 46th St, Chicago	
Immaculate Conception (Brighton Park)		2745 W 44th St, Chicago	
Immaculate Heart of Mary (Back of the Yards)		4515 S Ashland Ave, Chicago	Founded in 1945, weekly services discontinued in 2021
Nativity of Our Lord		653 W 37th St, Chicago	
Our Lady of Fatima (Brighton Park)		2751 W 38th Pl, Chicago	
Our Lady of Good Counsel		3528 S Hermitage Ave, Chicago	Founded in 1901, closed in 2022
Shrine of St. Anne		2751 W 38th Pl, Chicago	
St. Barbara		2859 S Throop St, Chicago	
St. Gabriel		4522 S Wallace St, Chicago	
St. Jerome Croatian		2823 South Princeton St, Chicago	
St. John Nepomucene (SPRED Chapel)		2956 S Lowe Ave, Chicago	Founded in 1871, closed in 2024
St. Joseph		4821 S Hermitage Ave, Chicago	
St. Mary of Perpetual Help		1039 W 32nd St, Chicago	Founded in 1885
St. Maurice		3615 S Hoyne Ave, Chicago	Founded in 1890, closed in 2020
St. Michael the Archangel (Back of the Yards)		4821 S Damen Ave, Chicago	
St. Pancratius		2957 W 40th Pl, Chicago	
St. Simon the Apostle		5157 S California Ave, Chicago	
St. Therese Chinese		218 W Alexander St, Chicago	Chinatown
Santa Lucia		3022 S Wells St, Chicago	Founded in 1943, closed in 2019

=== Deanery D: Chicago ===
Name	Image	Location	Description/sources
Holy Family		1080 W Roosevelt Rd, Chicago	Weekly services discontinued in 2020
Notre Dame de Chicago		1338 W Flournoy St, Chicago	
Old St. Mary's		1500 S Michigan Ave, Chicago	
Old St. Patrick's		700 W Adams St, Chicago	
Shrine of Our Lady of Pompei		1224 W Lexington St, Chicago	
Our Lady of Sorrows Basilica		3121 W Jackson Blvd, Chicago	
St. Agatha		3147 W Douglas Blvd, Chicago	
Shrine of St. Anthony		110 W Madison St, Chicago	
St. Malachy + Precious Blood		2248 W Washington Ave, Chicago	
St. Martin de Porres		5112 W Washington Blvd, Chicago	
National Shrine of St. Peregrine		3121 W Jackson Blvd, Chicago	
St. Peter		110 W Madison St, Chicago	

=== Deanery E: Chicago ===
Name	Image	Location	Description/sources
Assumption B.V.M.		2434 S California Ave, Chicago	Founded in 1903, closed in 2020
Epiphany		2524 S Keeler Ave, Chicago	
Good Shepherd		2719 S Kolin Ave, Chicago	
Our Lady of Tepeyac		3045 W Cermak Rd, Chicago	Now Mother Of The Americas Parish
Providence of God		717 W 18th St, Chicago	Founded in 1900, closed in 2022
St. Adalbert's in Chicago		1650 W 17th St, Chicago	Founded in 1874, closed in 2019
St. Agnes of Bohemia		2651 S Central Park Ave, Chicago	
St. Ann		1820 S Leavitt St, Chicago	Founded in 1903, closed in 2018
St. Francis of Assisi (Near West Side)		813 W Roosevelt Rd, Chicago	
Shrine of St. Jude Thaddeus		1901 S Ashland Ave, Chicago	
St. Paul		2127 W 22nd Pl, Chicago	
St. Pius V		1901 S Ashland Ave, Chicago	
St Procopius		1641 S Allport St, Chicago	
St. Roman		2311 S Washtenaw Ave, Chicago	Founded in 1928, closed in 2020

== Vicariate IV ==
=== Deanery A: Chicago ===
Name	Image	Location	Description/sources
Korean Martyrs Catholic Center		4115 N Kedvale Ave, Chicago	
Our Lady of Victory		5212 W Agatite Ave, Chicago	Founded in 1906, closed in 2022
Shrine of Sacred Heart		5835 W Irving Park Rd, Chicago	
St. Bartholomew		3601 N Lavergne Ave, Chicago	
St. Constance		5843 W Strong St, Chicago	
St. Ferdinand		5900 W Barry Ave, Chicago	
St. Genevieve		4835 W Altgeld St, Chicago	
St. James		5730 W Fullerton Ave, Chicago	
St. John Bosco		2301 N McVicker Ave, Chicago	
St. Ladislaus		3343 N Long Ave, Chicago	
St. Pascal		3935 N Melvina Ave, Chicago	
St. Robert Bellarmine		4646 N Austin Ave, Chicago	
St. Stanislaus Bishop and Martyr		5352 W Belden Ave, Chicago	
St. Viator		4170 W Addison St, Chicago	
St. Wenceslaus		3400 N Monticello Ave, Chicago	

=== Deanery B: Melrose Park & Oak Park ===
Name	Image	Location	Description/sources
St. Simeon		429 Bellwood Ave, Bellwood	Founded in 1930, closed in 2019
St. Bernardine		7246 W Harrison St, Forest Park	
St. Domitilla		4940 Washington St, Hillside	
St. Eulalia		1851 S 9th Ave, Maywood	
Our Lady of Mount Carmel		1101 N 23rd Ave, Melrose Park	
Shrine of Our Lady of Mount Carmel		1101 N 23rd Ave, Melrose Park	
Sacred Heart		819 N 16th Ave, Melrose Park	
St. Charles Borromeo		1637 N 37th Ave, Melrose Park	
St. John Vianney		46 N Wolf Rd, Northlake	
Ascension		801 S East Ave, Oak Park	
St. Catherine of Siena - St. Lucy		38 N Austin Blvd, Oak Park	Founded in 1889, closed in 2025
St. Edmund		188 S Oak Park Ave, Oak Park	
St. Giles		1045 N Columbian Ave, Oak Park	
St. Luke		7600 W Lake St, River Forest	
St. Vincent Ferrer		7525 W North Ave, River Forest	
Calvary Hill Shrine		1621 N 39th Ave, Stone Park	
The Oratory of the Sacred Heart at Casa Italia		3800 W Division St, Stone Park	

=== Deanery C: Berwyn & Cicero ===
Name	Image	Location	Description/sources
Czech Mission of Ss Cyril and Methodius		9415 Rochester Ave, Brookfield	
St. Leonard		3318 S Clarence Ave, Berwyn	
St. Mary of Celle		1428 Wesley Ave, Berwyn	
St. Odilo		2244 East Ave, Berwyn	
Mary Queen of Heaven		5300 W 24th St, Cicero	
Our Lady of Charity		3620 S 57th Ct, Cicero	
Our Lady of the Mount		2400 S 61st Ave, Cicero	
St. Anthony		1510 S 49th Ct, Cicero	
St. Frances of Rome		1500 S 59th Ct, Cicero	
St. Mary of Czestochowa		3010 S 48th St, Cicero	
St. Pius X		4300 S Oak Park Ave, Stickney	

=== Deanery D: Chicago & Schiller Park ===
Name	Image	Location	Description/sources
Our Lady, Mother of the Church		8701 W Lawrence Ave, Chicago	
St. Francis Borgia		8033 W Addison St, Chicago	
St. Priscilla		6949 W Addison St, Chicago	
St. William		2600 N Sayre Ave, Chicago	
St. Celestine		3020 N 76th Ct, Elmwood Park	Part of St. Mother Theodore Guerin Parish
St. Gertrude		9613 Schiller Blvd, Franklin Park	
St. Rosalie		4401 N Oak Park Ave, Harwood Heights	
Divine Savior		7750 W Montrose Ave, Norridge	Founded in 1955, closed in 2022
St. Cyprian		2601 N Clinton St, River Grove	Was part of St. Mother Theodore Guerin Parish - Founded in 1926, closed in 2026
St. Beatrice		4157 Atlantic Ave, Schiller Park	
St. Maria Goretti		3929 N Wehrman Ave, Schiller Park	

=== Deanery E: LaGrange and Riverside ===
Name	Image	Location	Description/sources
St. Barbara		4008 Prairie Ave, Brookfield	
St. Cletus		600 W 55th St, LaGrange	
St. Francis Xavier		124 N Spring Ave, LaGrange	
St. Louise de Marillac		1144 Harrison Ave, LaGrange	
St. Hugh		4315 Joliet Ave, Lyons	Founded in 1925, closed in 2021
St. Mary		126 Herrick Rd, Riverside	
Mater Christi		2401 S 10th Ave, North Riverside	
Shrine of Mother of Mothers		2431 S 10th Ave, North Riverside	
Divine Infant Jesus		1601 Newcastle Ave, Westchester	
Divine Providence		2550 Mayfair Ave, Westchester	
St. John of the Cross		5005 S Wolf Rd, Western Springs	

== Vicariate V ==
=== Deanery A: Chicago ===
Name	Image	Location	Description/sources
Nativity of the Blessed Virgin Mary		6812 S Washtenaw Ave, Chicago	
St. Mary, Star of the Sea		6435 S Kilbourn Ave, Chicago	
Queen of the Universe		7114 S Hamlin Ave, Chicago	Part of the Mary, Mother of Mercy Parish
St. Adrian		7000 S Fairfield Ave, Chicago	Part of the Mary, Mother of Mercy Parish
St. Bruno		4751 S Harding Ave, Chicago	
St. Clare of Montefalco		2640 W 55th St, Chicago	
St. Gall		5500 S. Kedzie Ave, Chicago	
St. Nicholas of Tolentine		6200 S Lawndale Ave, Chicago	
St. Richard		5000 S Kostner Ave, Chicago	
St. Rita of Cascia		6243 S Fairfield Ave, Chicago	
St. Turibius		5646 S Karlov Ave, Chicago	

=== Deanery B: Chicago ===
Name	Image	Location	Description/sources
Our Lady of the Snows		4810 S Leamington Ave, Chicago	
St. Blase		6101 S 75th Ave, Argo	
St. Camillus		5426 S Lockwood Ave, Chicago	Founded in 1921, closed in 2020
St. Daniel the Prophet		6612 W 54th St, Chicago	
St. Jane de Chantal		5252 S Austin Ave, Chicago	
St. Joseph		7240 W 57th St, Summit	Founded in 1902, closed in 2023
St. Rene Goupil		6949 W 63rd Pl, Chicago	
St. Symphorosa		6135 S Austin Ave, Chicago	

=== Deanery C: Chicago, Evergreen Park ===
Name	Image	Location	Description/sources
Christ the King		9235 S Hamilton Ave, Chicago	
St. Barnabas		10134 S Longwood Ave, Chicago	
St. Bede the Venerable		8200 S Kostner Ave, Chicago	
St. Cajetan		2443 W 112th St, Chicago	
St. Christina		11005 S. Homan Ave, Chicago	
St. Denis		3456 W 83rd Place, Chicago	
St. John Fisher		10235 S Fairfield Ave, Chicago	
Shrine of St. Rita		7740 S Western Ave, Chicago	
St. Thomas More		2825 W 81st St, Chicago	Founded in 1958, weekly services discontinued in 2025
St. Walter		11722 S Oakley Ave, Chicago	Founded in 1953, weekly services discontinued in 2021
Most Holy Redeemer		9525 S Lawndale Ave, Evergreen Park	
St. Bernadette		9349 S Francisco Ave, Evergreen Park	Founded in 1947, merged with Queen of Martyrs to form St. Gianna Parish in 2022. Church closed in 2024
St. Gianna		10233 S Central Park Ave, Evergreen Park	Founded in 2022 after the merger of St. Bernadette and Queen of Martyrs.

=== Deanery D: Oak Lawn ===
Name	Image	Location	Description/sources
St. Terrence		4300 W 119th Pl, Alsip	
St. Fabian		8300 Thomas Ave, Bridgeview	
St. Albert the Great		5555 W State Rd, Burbank	
Our Lady of the Ridge		10838 S Oxford Ave, Chicago Ridge	
St. Patricia		9050 S 86th Ave, Hickory Hills	
Our Lady of Loretto		8925 S Kostner Ave, Hometown	Founded in 1951, closed in 2020
St. Catherine of Alexandria		10621 S Kedvale Ave, Oak Lawn	
St. Gerald		9310 S 55th Ct, Oak Lawn	
St. Germaine		9711 S Kolin Ave, Oak Lawn	
St. Linus		10300 S. Lawler Ave, Oak Lawn	
St. Louis de Montfort		8808 Ridgeland Ave, Oak Lawn	Founded in 1963, closed in 2021

=== Deanery E: Lemont, Orland Park, Tinley Park ===
Name	Image	Location	Description/sources
Incarnation		5757 W 127th St, Crestwood	
Blessed Anton Martin Slomsek		14246 Main St, Lemont	Slovenian mission
Blessed Jurgis Matulaitas		14911 127th St, Lemont	Lithuanian mission
St. Alphonsus		605 State St, Lemont	
Ss Cyril and Methodius		608 Sobieski St, Lemont	
St. James at Sag Bridge		1600 S Archer Ave, Lemont	Listed on National Register of Historic Places
St. Patrick		200 E Illinois St, Lemont	
St. Christopher		4130-147th St, Midlothian	Founded 1924, Merged with St. Stanislaus Bishop and Martyr Parish July 1st, 2022, and formed St. Augustine Parish.
St. Damian		5300-155th St, Oak Forest	St. Damian Catholic Parish in Oak Forest has been serving the community since 1961. The announcement of the parish was made by Archbishop Albert Cardinal Meyer in 1961, and St. Damian School was built and dedicated in 1963.
Our Lady of the Woods		10731 W 131st St, Orland Park	
St. Elizabeth Seton		9300 W 167th St, Orland Park	
St. Francis of Assisi (Orland Park)		15050 S Wolf Rd, Orland Park	
St. Michael		14327 Highland Ave, Orland Park	
St. Alexander		7025 W 126th St, Palos Heights	
Sacred Heart		8245 W 111th St, Palos Hills	
St. George		6707 W 175th St, Tinley Park	
St. Julie Billiart		7399 W 159th St, Tinley Park	
St. Stephen, Deacon and Martyr		17500 S 84th Ave, Tinley Park	
Our Lady Mother of the Church & Shrine of St. Paul II		116 Hilton St, Willow Springs	Polish mission and shrine

== Vicariate VI ==
=== Deanery A: South Side, Chicago ===
Name	Image	Location	Description/sources
Shrine of Christ the King Sovereign Priest		6401 S Woodlawn Ave, Chicago	
Corpus Christi		4930 S King Dr, Chicago	Founded in 1901, closed in 2022
Holy Angels		615 E Oakwood Blvd, Chicago	
St. Ailbe		9015 S Harper Ave, Chicago	Part of St. Katharine Drexel Parish
St. Ambrose		1012 E 47th St, Chicago	Founded in 1904, closed in 2022
St. Anselm		6045 S Michigan Ave, Chicago	Founded in 1909, closed in 2022
St. Basil/Visitation		843 W. Garfield Blvd, Chicago	
St. Benedict the African		340 W 66th St, Chicago	
St. Elizabeth		50 E 41st St, Chicago	Founded in 1881, weekly services discontinued in 2021
St. Felicitas		1526 E 84th St, Chicago	Founded in 1919, closed in 2019
St. James		2942 S Wabash Ave, Chicago	
St. Joachim		700 E 91st St, Chicago	Founded in 1894, closed in 2019
St. Thomas the Apostle		5472 S Kimbark Ave, Chicago	

=== Deanery B: Chicago ===
Name	Image	Location	Description/sources
Haitian Catholic Apostolate		7841 S Jeffrey St, Chicago	
Holy Name of Mary		1401 W 112th St, Chicago	
Our Lady Gate of Heaven		2330 E 99th St, Chicago	Founded in 1947, closed in 2020
Our Lady of Peace		2010 E 79th St, Chicago	Founded in 1919, closed in 2020
Sacred Heart Mission		11652 S Church St, Chicago	
St. Bride		7801 S Coles Ave, Chicago	Founded in 1900, closed in 2020
St. Clotilde		8430 S Calumet Ave, Chicago	Founded in 1928, closed in 2022
St. Columbanus		331 E 71st St, Chicago	
St. Dorothy		450 E 78th St, Chicago	Founded in 1916, closed in 2022
St. John de la Salle		10205 S Martin Luther King Dr, Chicago	Founded in 1948, weekly services discontinued in 2022
St. Kilian		8725 S May St, Chicago	Founded in 1904, closed in 2023
St. Margaret of Scotland		9837 S Throop St, Chicago	
Ss Peter and Paul		12433 S Halsted St, Chicago	Founded in 1913, closed in 2023
St. Philip Neri		2132 E 72nd St, Chicago	
St. Sabina		1210 W 78th Pl, Chicago	

=== Deanery C: Chicago ===
Name	Image	Location	Description/sources
Mother of God		14148 Green Bay Ave, Burnham	Founded in 1946, closed in 2020
Annunciata		3747 E 111th St, Chicago	
Immaculate Conception (South Chicago)		2944 E 88th St, Chicago	
Our Lady of Guadalupe		3200 E 91st St, Chicago	
Sacred Heart Croatian		2864 E 96th St, Chicago	
St Anthony		11544 S Prairie Ave, Chicago	
St. Columba		3340 E 134th St, Chicago	Founded in 1884, closed in 2020
St. Florian		13145 S Houston Ave, Chicago	
St. Francis de Sales		10201 S Ewing Ave, Chicago	Founded in 1888, closed in 2020
St. George		9546 S Ewing Ave, Chicago	Founded in 1903, closed in 2020
National Shrine of St. Jude		3200 E 91st St, Chicago	
St. Kevin		10501 S Torrence Ave, Chicago	Founded in 1884, closed in 2021
St. Michael the Archangel (South Chicago)		8237 S Shore Dr, Chicago	Founded in 1892, closed in 2021

=== Deanery D: Blue Island, Calumet City, Chicago Heights, Harvey, South Holland ===
Name	Image	Location	Description/sources
St. Benedict		2339 York St, Blue Island	
St. Donatus		1919 Union St, Blue Island	
Our Lady of Knock		501 163rd St, Calumet City	
St. Andrew the Apostle		768 Lincoln Ave, Calumet City	
St. Victor		553 Hirsch Ave, Calumet City	Founded in 1925, closed in 2020
St. Agnes		1501 Chicago Rd, Chicago Heights	
St. Kieran		724 W 195th St, Chicago Heights	
St. Paul		206 E 25th St, Chicago Heights	Founded in 1897, closed in 2022
St. Emeric		4300 W 180th St, Country Club Hills	Founded in 1959, closed in 2023
Infant Jesus of Prague		1131 Douglas Ave, Flossmoor	
St. John		301 S Cottage Grove Ave, Glenwood	Founded in 1897, closed in 2022
Ascension St. Susanna		15234 Myrtle Ave, Harvey	Founded in 1899 and 1927 (merged in 1986), closed in 2022
St. John the Baptist		15746 Union Ave, Harvey	
St. Anne		16801 Dixie Hwy, Hazel Crest	Founded in 1949, weekly services discontinued in 2022
St. Joseph		17951 Dixie Hwy, Homewood	
St. Ann		3010 Ridge Rd, Lansing	
St. Gerard Majella		16130 Clifton Pk, Markham	Founded in 1956, closed in 2022
St. Lawrence O'Toole		4101 St. Lawrence Ave, Matteson	Founded in 1961, closed in 2023
St. Irenaeus		78 Cherry St, Park Forest	Founded in 1948, closed in 2023
St. Stanislaus Bishop and Martyr		14410 S McKinley Ave, Posen	Founded in 1893, closed in 2022
St. Mary Queen of Apostles		207 W 145th St, Riverdale	Founded in 1886 (St. Mary) and 1953 (Queen of Apostles), merged in 2011, closed in 2019
St. Peter Claver		14139 S Claire Ave, Robbins	Founded in 1958, weekly services discontinued in 2021
St. James		22400 S Torrence Ave, Sauk Village	Founded in 1886, closed in 2023
Holy Ghost		700 E 170th St, South Holland	Founded in 1962, closed in 2019
St. Jude the Apostle		900 E 154th St, South Holland	
San Rocco Oratory		16565 S State St, South Holland	

== Other ==
Name	Image	Location	Description/sources
Holy Family		1840 Lincoln St, North Chicago	Former Catholic church listed on National Register of Historic Places (Founded in 1901, closed in 1991)
Madonna Della Strada Chapel		6453 N Kenmore Ave, Chicago	
St. Boniface		1358 W Chestnut St, Chicago	Founded in 1904, Closed in 1990, converted into condos
St. Vitus		1814 S Paulina St, Chicago	Founded in 1896, closed in 1990
