= Saints Cyril and Methodius Church (Chicago) =

Coordinates: 41.8029°N 87.66829°W

- Saints Cyril and Methodius Bohemian Roman Catholic Church
- Svatý Cyrila a Metoděje Český Římskokatolický Kostel
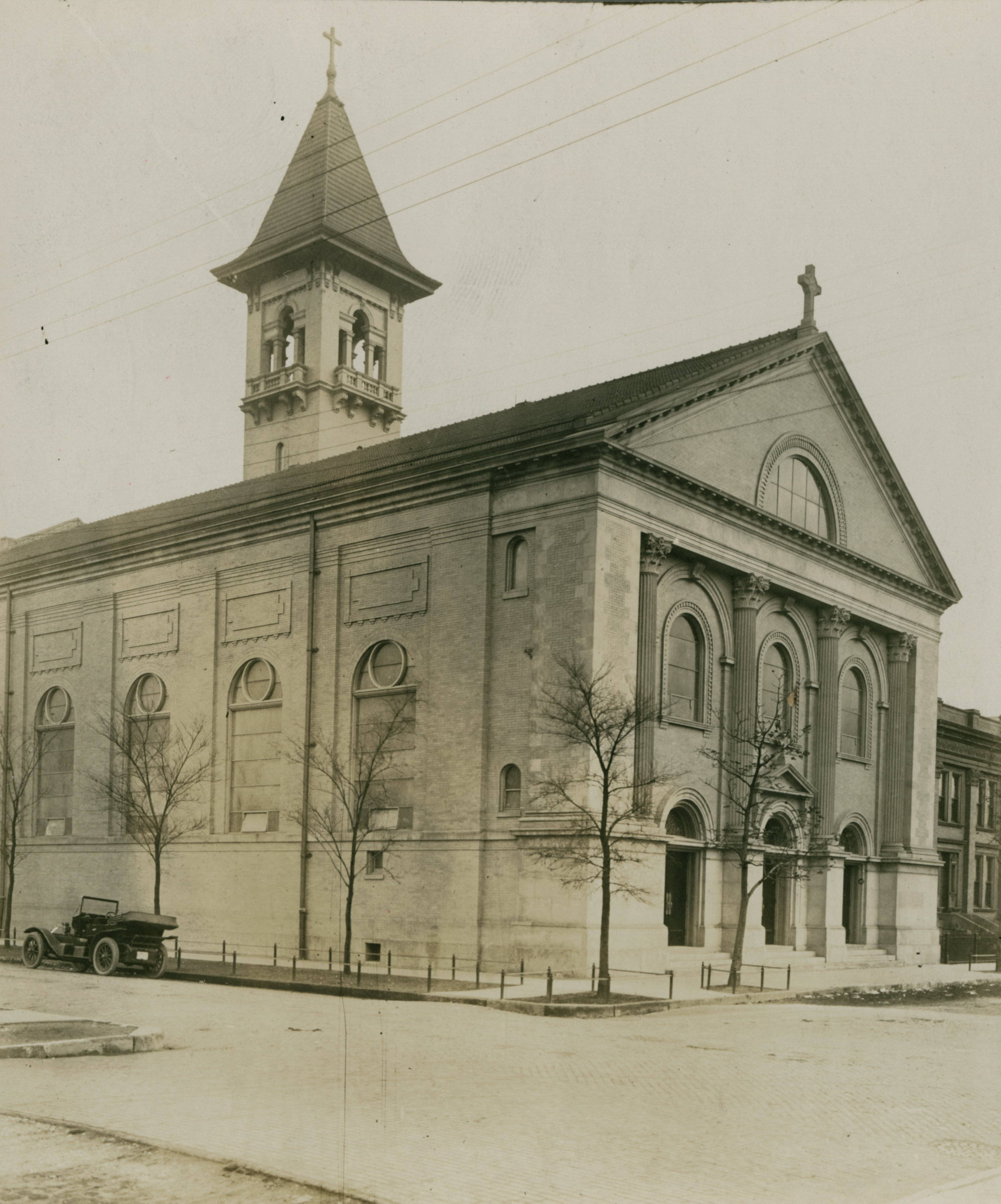
- A view of Sts. Cyril and Methodius's front facade. Photo taken in 1913.
- Saints Cyril and Methodius Church
- Location: 5009 South Hermitage Avenue, Chicago, Illinois, 60609
- Denomination: Roman Catholic

History
- Status: Permanently closed
- Founded: 1891
- Founder: Bohemian immigrants
- Dedication: Saints Cyril and Methodius
- Dedicated: ~1913

Architecture
- Architect: Joseph Molitor
- Architectural type: Church
- Style: Renaissance Revival
- Completed: 1913
- Closed: Saturday, June 30, 1990

Specifications
- Materials: Stone and Marble

Administration
- Province: Ecclesiastical Province of Chicago
- Archdiocese: Roman Catholic Archdiocese of Chicago
- Diocese: Roman Catholic Diocese of Chicago
- Parish: Saints Cyril and Methodius Parish

Saints Cyril and Methodius Church (Czech: Kostel Svatých Cyrila a Metoděje) was a historic church of the Roman Catholic Archdiocese of Chicago. It was located in Chicago, Illinois at 5009 South Hermitage Avenue. Built in 1913, Sts. Cyril and Methodius served a Bohemian congregation for decades until archdiocesan budget cuts in 1990 led to the church being closed.

== History ==
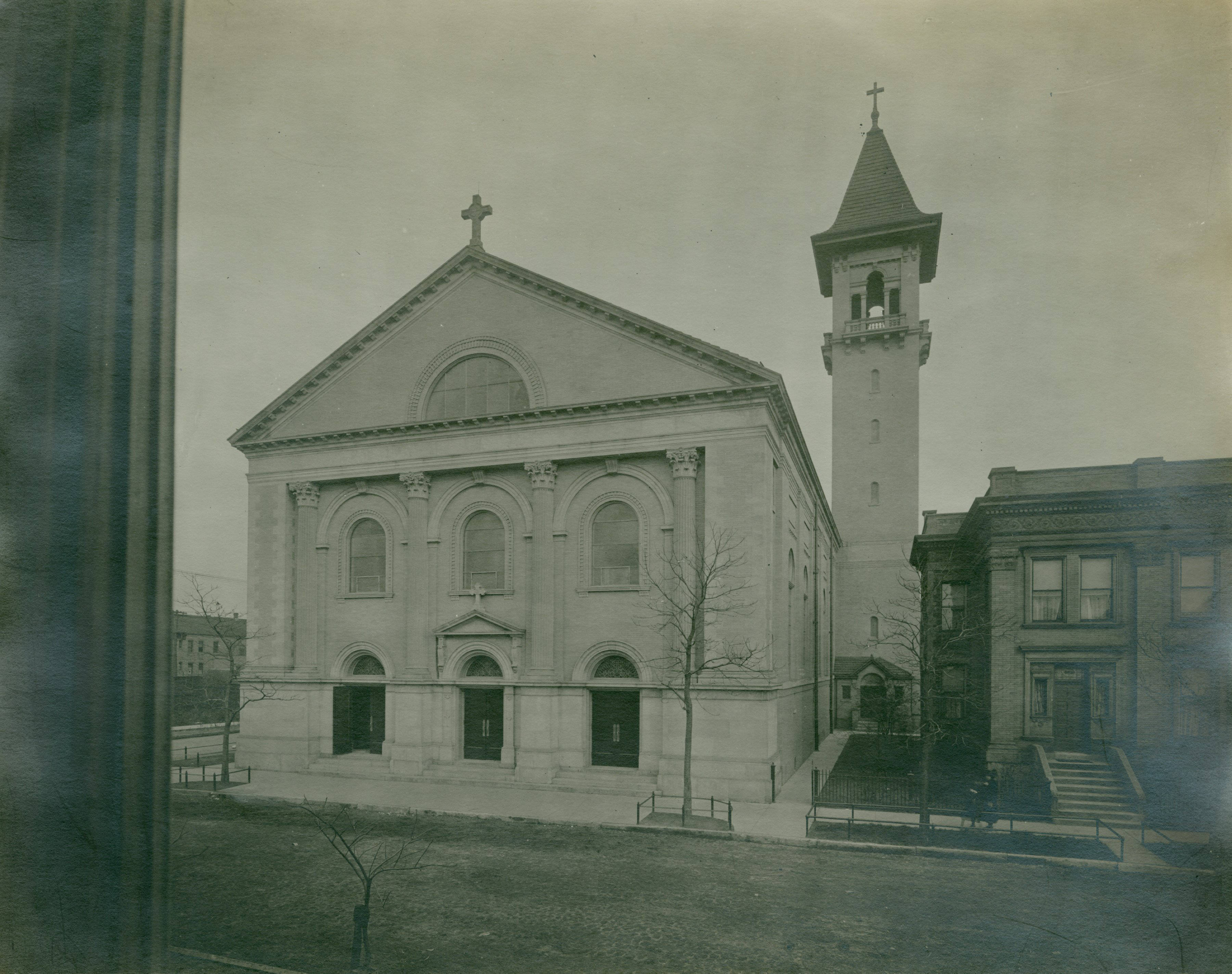
A view of Sts. Cyril and Methodius from across the street.

=== Founding ===
Sts. Cyril and Methodius Church was built in 1913 in order to serve a Bohemian congregation.

=== Decline ===
When Reverend Charles J. Kouba arrived at Sts. Cyril and Methodius in 1971 as its new pastor, the parish consisted of 900 families, and five masses were offered on weekends. By 1990, the parish had been reduced to 150 families, and the weekend masses, which were condensed into only two services, saw an average of about 100 attendees. During the week of January 14–20 in 1990, the congregation contributed only $543 to the collection basket, which was barely enough to pay the church building's $2,000 monthly utility bills.

==== Closure ====
In 1990, the Archdiocese of Chicago closed multiple parishes as part of a controversial budget cut that attempted to reduce the archdiocesan debt. During a meeting on Saturday, January 20, 1990, Reverend Kouba, long-time parish pastor for almost 19 years, told a group of 35 parishioners that the church would close on June 30 of the same year. After the church closed, Kouba became an associate pastor at the nearby St. Joseph Church, which, along with Holy Cross, Immaculate Heart of Mary, and Saint Michael Archangel, is and remains one of the four churches in the neighborhood.

== Architecture ==
The architect Joseph Molitor, himself a Bohemian-born American, designed Sts. Cyril and Methodius in the Renaissance Revival style. The building was originally constructed in 1913, and the church grounds included a convent. Due to the changes ushered in by the Second Vatican Council, the interior of the church building saw several renovations and a simpler design. Marlite (plastic wall paneling made to resemble marble in appearance) was used to simplify the walls, though the building retained its original stained glass windows, which were created by the Munich Studio in Chicago.
