= Joseph W. McCarthy =

American architect (1884–1965)

Joseph William McCarthy, AIA (June 22, 1884 – 1965), was an architect in the early 20th century most famous for his work on buildings for the Roman Catholic Church. He was born in Jersey City, New Jersey, on June 22, 1884, and attended Holy Innocents School in New York City until the 8th grade. He moved to Chicago, Illinois, and graduated from St. Gabriel High School in 1901 before entering the architecture firm of Daniel Burnham, a noted Chicago architect for whom he worked eight years. He then worked for two years with British-born Chicago church architect J.E.O. Pridmore before opening his own practice in 1911.

He later worked under the firm name of McCarthy, Smith and Eppig, and also McCarthy and Smith. Others with whom he worked in the late 1950s as "Joseph W. McCarthy and Associates" included Richard R. Reedy and Max A. Eckert. He served as chairman of the Chicago Housing Authority from 1938 to 1942 and was given the Catholic honor of Knight of St. Sylvester by Cardinal Mundelein of Chicago in 1924. He died in 1965 at the age of 81.

McCarthy is credited with at least 41 churches in addition to schools, hospitals, convents and other buildings.

Although McCarthy frequently designed his buildings using the traditional Gothic and Romanesque styles, he was one of the only American Catholic architects of his time to also design churches in the New England colonial mode. He is also noted for the unique design of the Art Deco altars that were installed in many of his churches. St. Carthage Roman Catholic Church and School, located at 7320 S. Yale Avenue in Chicago, Illinois, was built 1920-1921 and is an example of a Renaissance Revival style religious facility designed by McCarthy. Many of McCarthy's design for religious facilities in Chicago are included in the National Register of Historic Places Multiple Property Documentation Ethnic (European) Historic Settlement in the City of Chicago (1860-1930).

Favored not only by Cardinal Mundelein but several other Catholic Church officials, McCarthy was one of the most prolific designers of buildings for the Roman Catholic Church in the United States in the early twentieth century. His credited buildings include the 15-floor Mundelein College Skyscraper at Loyola University Chicago, constructed in 1931, and the entire campus design at Mundelein Seminary, constructed 1918–1934, as well as the Benedictine Convent and shrine in Libertyville, Illinois (now known as Marytown), Immaculate Conception Church in Waukegan, Illinois, Our Lady of Peace Church in Chicago, the Cathedral of St. Raymond in Joliet, Illinois, and the Cathedral of the Immaculate Conception in Springfield, Illinois. He was also the architect of record for the Saint Philip Neri Church (1928), on East 72nd Street, in Chicago's south side, a high rise on 1540 North Lake Drive (17 floors), opened 1926, and the Corpus Christi Church, constructed in 1916, on East 49th Street, in Chicago's south side. An article on McCarthy's involvement in the Springfield Cathedral appeared in 1929. Other buildings include Chicago's Notre Dame High School for Girls (c. 1938), Mercy High School in Chicago (31st Street, c. 1923), the upper church of Santa Sabina Church in Chicago, and the rectory of Chicago's Holy Name Cathedral.

He died at West Suburban Hospital in Oak Pak. At the time of his death he lived at 6936 W. Roosevelt Road, Oak Park. He was survived by his widow, Mary, their daughter Mrs. Miriam M. Hommel of Denver, 3 grandchildren and 6 great grandchildren.

== Works include ==
Under his own name:

- St. Francis Xavier Church, La Grange, Illinois
- Mary, Queen of Heaven Church, Cicero, Illinois
- Immaculate Conception Church, Waukegan, Illinois
- Cathedral of the Immaculate Conception, Springfield, Illinois
- Cathedral of St. Raymond Nonnatus, Joliet, Illinois
- St. Philip Neri Church, South Shore, Chicago, Illinois
- Our Lady of Peace, South Shore, Chicago, Illinois
- Corpus Christi Church, South Side, Chicago, Illinois
- St. Sabina Church, Auburn Gresham, Chicago, Illinois
- St. Carthage Church and School, Englewood, Chicago, Illinois
- Our Lady of Lourdes Church, Chicago, Illinois (original building by Worthmann and Steinbach later enlarged and relocated by McCarthy)
- St. Basil Church, New City, Chicago, Illinois
- St. Teresa of the Infant Jesus Church, Auburn Gresham, Chicago, Illinois
- Chapel of the Immaculate Conception, St. Mary of the Lake Seminary, Mundelein, Illinois
- St. Thomas of Canterbury Church, Uptown, Chicago, Illinois
- St. Jerome Church, Chicago, Illinois (original building by Charles H. Prindeville of Egan & Prindeville, sanctuary enlarged at east end with new altar by McCarthy)

With McCarthy, Smith and Eppig:

- St. Joseph Church, Wilmette, Illinois
- St. Francis Church, Wilmette, Illinois
- St. Athanasius Church, Evanston, Illinois
- St. Giles Church, Oak Park, Illinois
- Our Lady of Grace Church, Logan Square, Chicago, Illinois
- St. Killian Church, Auburn Gresham, Chicago, Illinois
- Blessed Sacrament Church, North Lawndale, Chicago, Illinois
- St. Wenceslaus Church, Avondale, Chicago, Illinois
- St. Edward Church, Chicago, Illinois
- Queen of Angels Church, Chicago, Illinois

 ST. Luke Church, River Forest
 ST. Catherine Church, Oak Park.
