= Holy Cross in Chicago =

Holy Cross in Chicago may refer to:

- Holy Cross Church in Chicago
- Holy Cross Hospital (Chicago)
