= St. Gertrude's Parish (Chicago) =

Catholic parish and church building in Chicago, Illinois

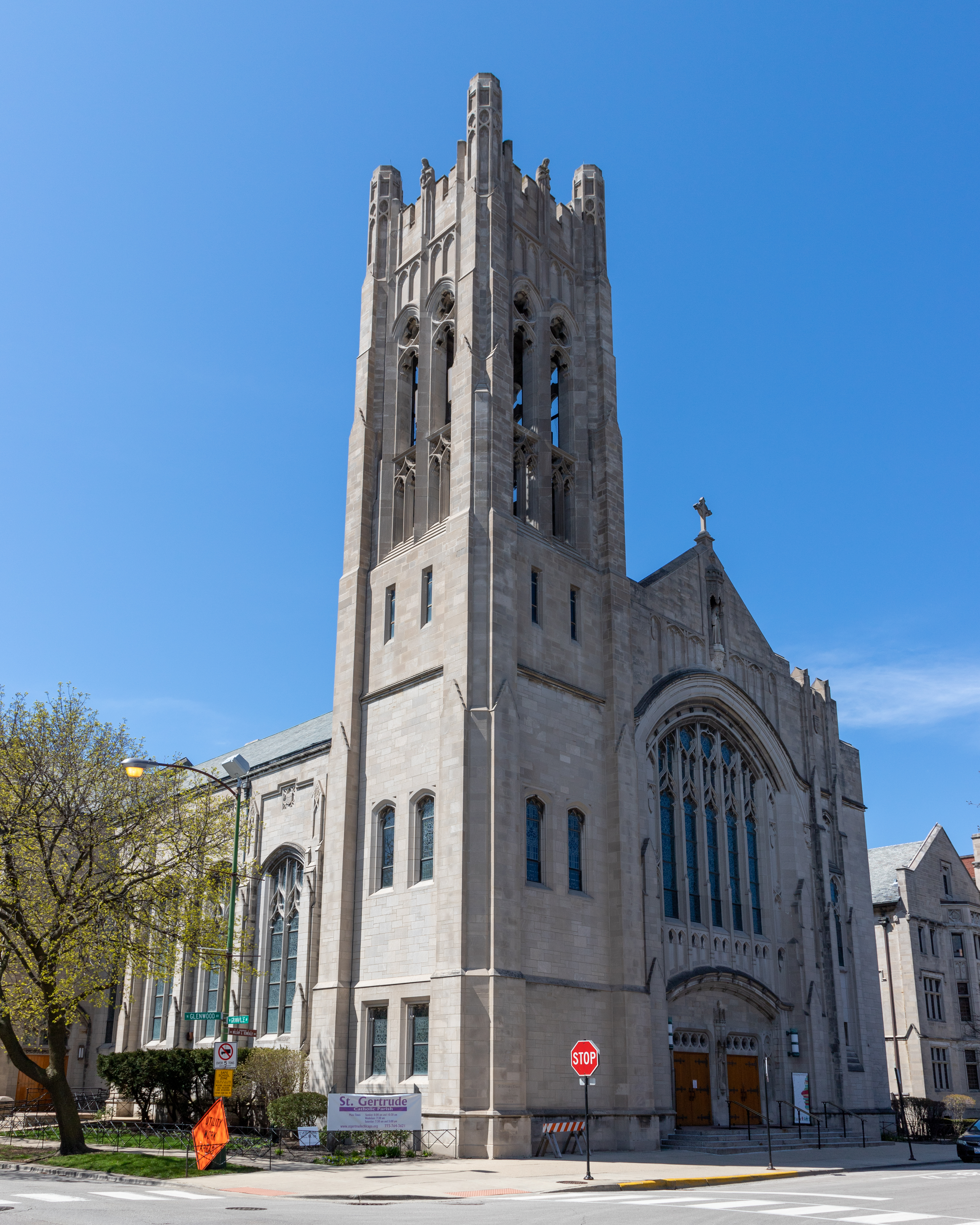
- St. Gertrude Catholic Church, Chicago, Illinois. Architect: James Burns (ca. 1858–1933). Dedicated November 15, 1931.
- St. Gertrude's Parish
- 41.9944°N 87.6655°W
- Location: Chicago, Illinois
- Address: 1420 West Granville Avenue, Chicago, Illinois 60660
- Country: United States
- Denomination: Roman Catholic
- Sui iuris church: Latin Church
- Website: stgertrudechicago.org

History
- Status: Parish church
- Founded: 3 January 1912
- Founder: Rev. Peter Shewbridge
- Dedication: Saint Gertrude
- Dedicated: 15 November 1931

Architecture
- Functional status: Active
- Architect: James Burns
- Architectural type: Church
- Style: English Gothic
- Groundbreaking: 30 November 1930
- Completed: November 15, 1931
- Construction cost: $225,000

Specifications
- Capacity: 650
- Materials: Bedford limestone

Administration
- Archdiocese: Chicago
- Parish: St. Gertrude

Clergy
- Pastor: Rev. Sergio Romo

St. Gertrude's Parish is a Roman Catholic parish in the Edgewater community area on the North Side of Chicago, Illinois. Established in 1912, the parish comprises a church, rectory and former convent clustered near the intersection of Granville and Glenwood avenues, and is part of the Roman Catholic Archdiocese of Chicago. Its English Gothic church building, designed by architect James Burns and completed in 1931, was one of the few churches in Chicago erected during the Great Depression.

== History ==
=== Founding ===
St. Gertrude's Parish was established on January 3, 1912, to serve Catholic families living in North Edgewater, in the area bounded by Thorndale Avenue, Devon Avenue, Lake Michigan and Ravenswood Avenue. The parish was organized through the efforts of six families and its first pastor, Rev. Peter Shewbridge; before a church was built, Sunday Mass was celebrated in the auditorium of Hayt School. Many of the early parishioners were immigrants from Germany, Ireland and Luxembourg.

A temporary frame church was erected on the north side of Granville Avenue, just west of Glenwood Avenue, and was in use by Palm Sunday, March 31, 1912. The unheated building was reportedly so cold that Shewbridge warmed the cruets by hand before the offertory.

=== Combination church and school ===
Ground was broken in May 1912 at 6220 Glenwood Avenue for a three-story combination church and school building, which was dedicated by Archbishop James Edward Quigley on December 1, 1912. The church occupied the first floor, classrooms the second and third floors, and an assembly hall the basement; movable partitions allowed the first-floor classrooms to be opened up for Sunday Mass and closed again for weekday classes.

North Edgewater developed rapidly after World War I, and Rev. Bernard C. Heeney, then pastor, made plans for a permanent church separate from the school. Throughout the 1920s the parish held annual building-fund events in the ballroom of the Edgewater Beach Hotel. Two buildings designed by James Burns were completed by 1929: a rectory at 1420 Granville Avenue and a convent at 6214 Glenwood Avenue.

=== Permanent church ===
The cornerstone of the present church was laid on November 30, 1930, and construction was completed on November 15, 1931. Burns again served as architect, and the general contractor was Matt Rauen, a parishioner whose shop stood on Ravenswood Avenue between Thome and Highland avenues. The Bedford limestone for the façade had been quarried, cut and paid for before the stock market crash of 1929. With pledges intended to fund the interior work in doubt, Heeney sought to halt construction, but the congregation pressed ahead; some parishioners donated wedding rings and other jewelry to be melted down for a chalice. The building was one of the few churches, or buildings of any kind, completed in Chicago during the Great Depression.

=== Later years ===
The liturgical reforms of the Second Vatican Council reached the parish in the mid-1960s under pastors Gerald Kealy and Lawrence Lynch, who established the basis for expanded lay participation. Under Rev. William Kenneally, who became pastor in 1984, the parish responded to a neighborhood of increasing diversity of race, ethnicity and sexual orientation with initiatives including the Heart to Heart outreach program for seniors, a Mass celebrated in the parish gymnasium, a Sunday Mass on Sheridan Road, participation in the founding of Northside Catholic Academy, and a parish synod held in 2007. The parish marked its centennial in 2012 under Rev. Dominic Grassi.

A subsequent capital campaign raised more than $1.5 million for building maintenance, funding a new sound system, tuckpointing of the bell tower, electrical work, new handrails, refinishing of the church doors and structural repairs to the former convent, now used as the parish Ministry Center. The parish also undertook a restoration of the church interior, including repainting.

== Architecture ==
The church is an English Gothic structure faced in Bedford limestone. Its interior Gothic arches were designed so that no columns obstruct the view of the main altar from any of the 650 seats. The five altars are of Italian Carrara marble with gold mosaic and Pavonazzo trim, and the stained glass windows were made by the Franz Mayer firm of Munich, Germany. The original Kilgen pipe organ cost $18,000, and the total cost of the building was $225,000.

The façade is composed of two wide arches set above stained glass windows and two sets of double doors. In keeping with the Gothic style, the arches carry carved stone symbols: one row includes acorns, grapes, a cornucopia, a bridge, a bell, keys, a bird and a pineapple, and a second row consists of floral motifs. The four central carvings depict a dove with an olive branch, the face of a prophet, a bell and the four Gospel writers.

== School ==
From its opening in 1912 the parish school was staffed by the Sisters of Charity of the Blessed Virgin Mary (B.V.M.s), who taught there for several decades; the building later known as the Ministry Center was originally built as their convent. The parish school later became part of Northside Catholic Academy, a consolidated regional Catholic school. The first-floor classrooms of the 1912 combination building remain in use as the cafeteria of the academy's Primary School Campus.

== Pastors ==
- Rev. Peter Shewbridge (1912–?)
- Rev. Bernard C. Heeney
- Rev. Gerald Kealy
- Rev. Lawrence Lynch
- Rev. William Kenneally (1984–?)
- Rev. Dominic Grassi (?–2017)
- Rev. Rich Prendergast (2017–2023)
- Rev. Mike Gabriel (2023–2025)
- Rev. Sergio Romo (2025–present)

== See also ==
- List of churches in the Roman Catholic Archdiocese of Chicago
- Edgewater, Chicago
