= Beaverville Township, Iroquois County, Illinois =

Beaverville Township
- Township
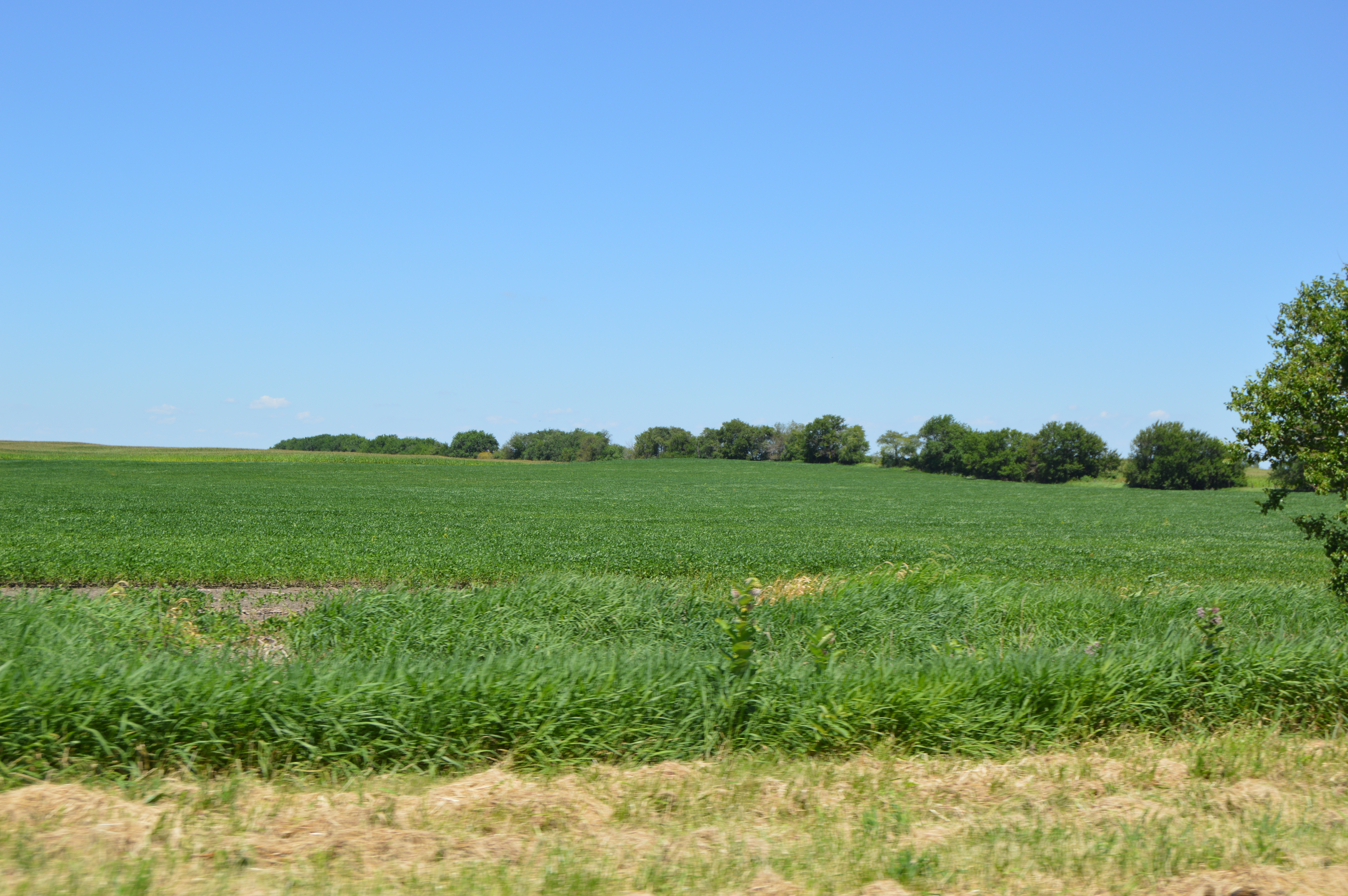
- Fields west of Beaverville

- Location in Iroquois County

- Iroquois County's location in Illinois
- Coordinates: 40°58′24″N 87°36′13″W
- Country: United States
- State: Illinois
- County: Iroquois
- Established: September 1921

Area
  - Total: 37.81 sq mi (97.9 km^{2})
  - Land: 37.80 sq mi (97.9 km^{2})
  - Water: 0.01 sq mi (0.026 km^{2}) 0.02%
- Elevation: 636 ft (194 m)

Population (2020)
  - Total: 515
  - Density: 13.6/sq mi (5.26/km^{2})
- Time zone: UTC-6 (CST)
  - Summer (DST): UTC-5 (CDT)
- ZIP codes: 60912, 60931, 60964
- FIPS code: 17-075-04520

Beaverville Township is one of twenty-six townships in Iroquois County, Illinois, USA. As of the 2020 census, its population was 515 and it contained 243 housing units. Beaverville Township formed from portions of Papineau Township and Beaver Township in September, 1921.

== Geography ==
According to the 2021 census gazetteer files, Beaverville Township has a total area of 37.81 square miles (97.93 km^{2}), of which 37.80 square miles (97.90 km^{2}) (or 99.98%) is land and 0.01 square miles (0.03 km^{2}) (or 0.02%) is water.

=== Cities, towns, villages ===
- Beaverville

=== Unincorporated towns ===
- North Hooper at 40.950589°N 87.606977°W

(This list is based on USGS data and may include former settlements.)

=== Cemeteries ===
The township contains Saint Mary's Cemetery.

== Demographics ==
As of the 2020 census there were 515 people, 267 households, and 171 families residing in the township. The population density was 13.62 inhabitants per square mile (5.26/km^{2}). There were 243 housing units at an average density of 6.43 per square mile (2.48/km^{2}). The racial makeup of the township was 88.35% White, 5.05% African American, 0.00% Native American, 0.00% Asian, 0.00% Pacific Islander, 2.33% from other races, and 4.27% from two or more races. Hispanic or Latino of any race were 4.85% of the population.

There were 267 households, out of which 27.70% had children under the age of 18 living with them, 47.57% were married couples living together, 13.86% had a female householder with no spouse present, and 35.96% were non-families. 35.20% of all households were made up of individuals, and 17.60% had someone living alone who was 65 years of age or older. The average household size was 2.10 and the average family size was 2.61.

The township's age distribution consisted of 20.2% under the age of 18, 5.0% from 18 to 24, 23.8% from 25 to 44, 23.7% from 45 to 64, and 27.3% who were 65 years of age or older. The median age was 47.3 years. For every 100 females, there were 105.1 males. For every 100 females age 18 and over, there were 90.2 males.

The median income for a household in the township was $43,897, and the median income for a family was $49,063. Males had a median income of $32,344 versus $29,792 for females. The per capita income for the township was $21,565. About 6.4% of families and 12.1% of the population were below the poverty line, including 8.8% of those under age 18 and 16.3% of those age 65 or over.

Historical population
Census	Pop.	Note	%±
2000	650		—
2010	609		−6.3%
2020	515		−15.4%
U.S. Decennial Census

== School districts ==
- Donovan Community Unit School District 3

== Political districts ==
- Illinois' 15th congressional district
- State House District 79
- State Senate District 40
