= Joseph Molitor =

- Josef Molitor
- Born: February 14, 1874; Bohemia, Austria-Hungary
- Died: August 26, 1917; Chicago, Illinois, United States
- Resting place: St. Adalbert Cemetery, Niles, Illinois
- Occupation: Architect
- Years active: ~1900–1915
- Notable work: St. Mary's Church, Beaverville Holy Cross Church, Chicago St. Joseph Roman Catholic Church
- Spouse: Teresa Molitor
- Children: 3

Joseph Molitor (14 February 1874 – 26 August 1917) was a Bohemian-born architect with a noteworthy legacy in church architecture.

== Early life ==
A map of Austria-Hungary. The province of Bohemia is denoted with the number "1".

Molitor was born Josef Molitor on 14 February 1874, the Catholic feast day of Saint Valentine. He spent his early years in the then Austro-Hungarian province of Bohemia. He eventually moved to the United States sometime in the 1890s.

== Career ==
In the 1890s, Molitor formed a partnership with Charles W. Kallal and designed St. Vitus's Bohemian church. As an independent architect, Molitor drew up the architectural plans for a number of churches, most of which are located in Chicago and its surrounding suburbs. They are noted for their refined architectural stylings, such structures include the Chicago churches of Sts. Cyril and Methodius (now closed), St. Lawrence, St. Francis of Assisi, St. Joseph Roman Catholic Church on, St. Bonaventure, and Holy Cross Roman Catholic Church, as well as St. Mary's Church in Beaverville, a suburb of Chicago. Molitor also designed the Passionist Father's Monastery in the North Side of Chicago. Molitor's career in the city was brief, as there is currently no evidence of any other commissions dating after 1915.

The most prominent recurring architectural styles in Molitor's works include the Baroque and Romanesque Revival styles. Minor elements of Gothic and Neoclassic architecture are also visible in some of his works. Another pattern seen throughout several churches designed by Molitor is the presence of twin towers at the front of a church, something that is very common in European church architecture.

== Personal life ==
Molitor was married to Teresa Molitor (8 October 1878 - 28 September 1917). It is not known whether they were married in Bohemia or in the United States after immigrating. The couple had three children: Frances, Josephine, and Genevieve. At the time of Molitor's death, the family was living in the present-day Ukrainian Village neighborhood of Chicago.

== Death and burial ==
In the autumn of 1916, Molitor suffered a nervous breakdown. Molitor's death at the age of 42 is recorded in two Chicago Tribune obituaries. According to Molitor's wife, Teresa, on 26 August 1917, he was refused admittance to the "Washingtonian Home" on 1533 West Madison Street. Later that day, at around 9:00 p.m., he died in a taxi cab while being transported to a local hospital. Joseph Molitor was buried three days later on August 29 in St. Adalbert Cemetery in Niles, Illinois. After Molitor's death, the Washingtonian Home's superintendent, W. H. Barton, stated that he was investigating whether or not an employee at the Home was justified in turning Molitor away. Just over a month after Molitor died, on 28 September 1917, his wife Teresa died as well, just 10 days away from her 39th birthday. The couple is buried together at St. Adalbert.

== Gallery ==
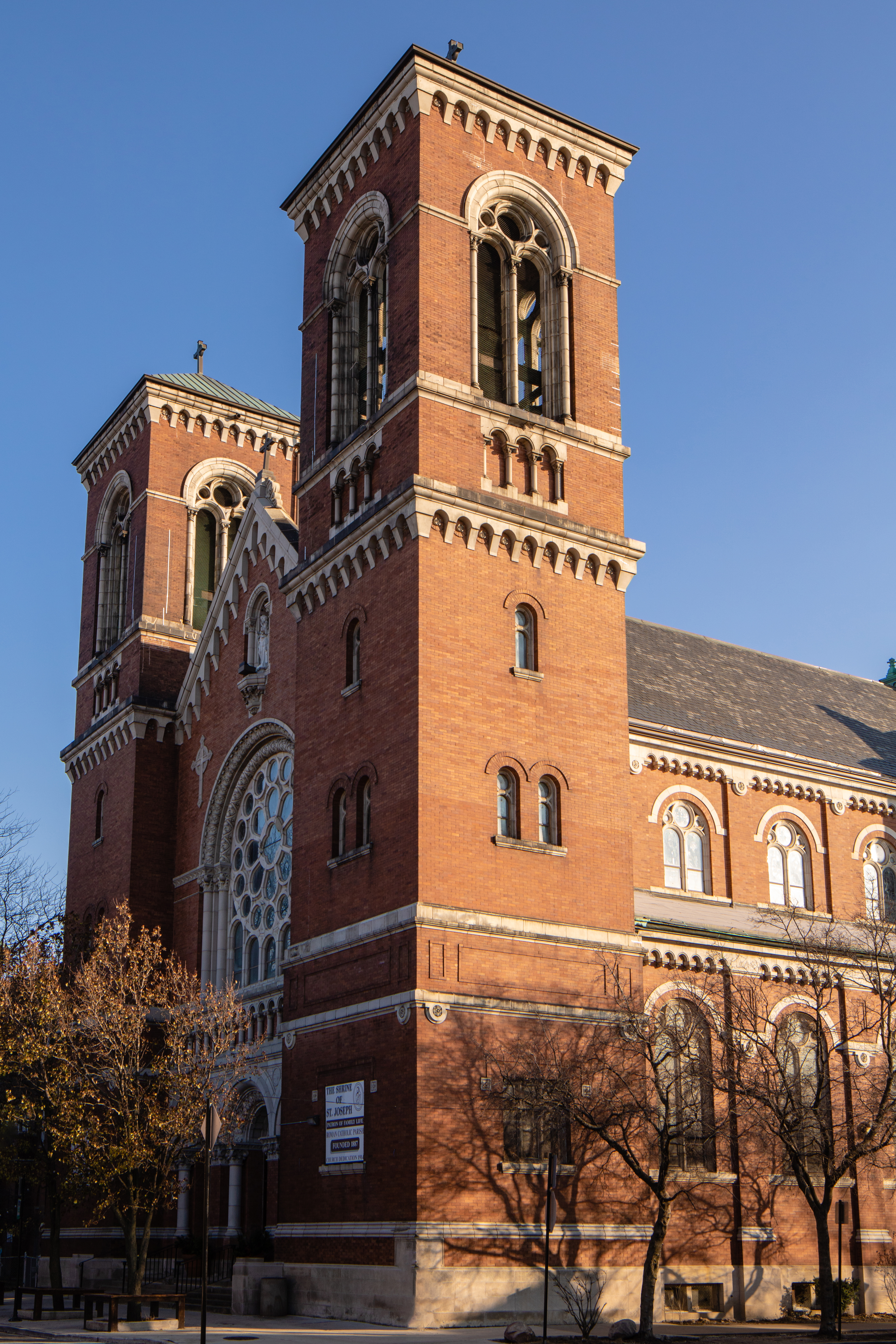
A view of St. Joseph Church, Chicago. Molitor built this church mostly in the Baroque style.

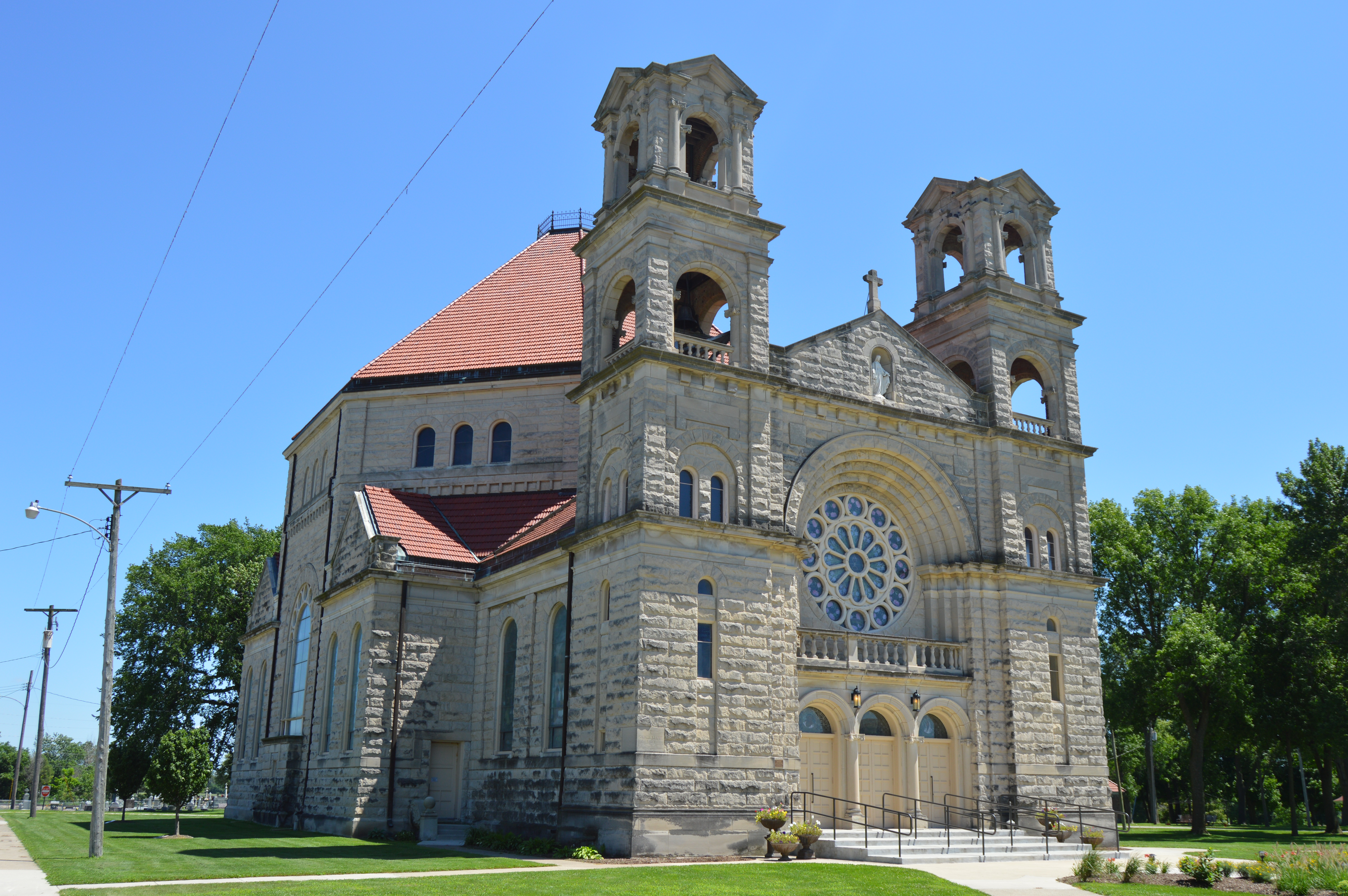
St. Mary's Church in Beaverville. This structure in particular was designed in the Romanesque Revival style.

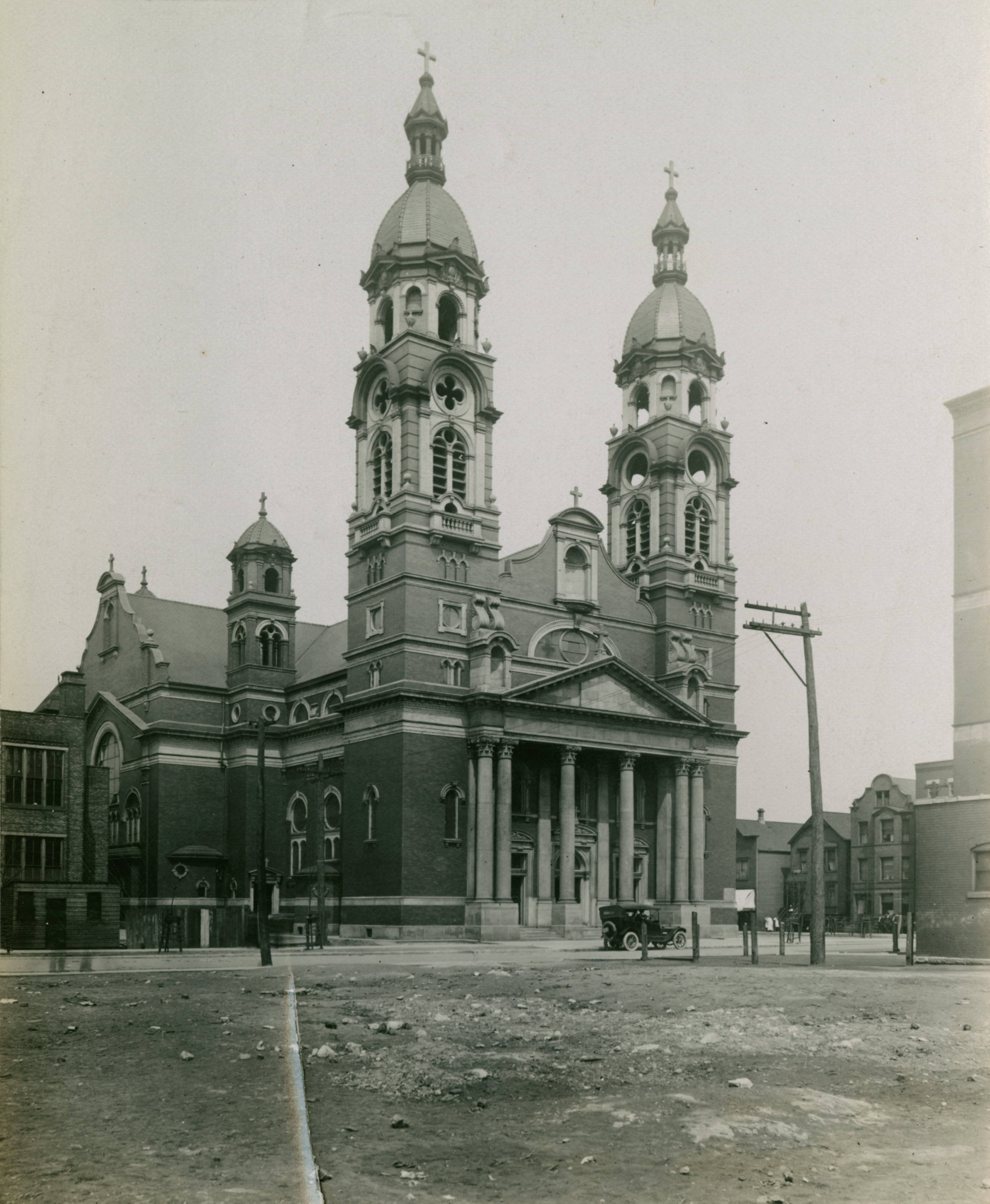
A photograph of Holy Cross Church near Chicago's Union Stock Yards. The image was captured in 1914, just before the Baroque building was completed.

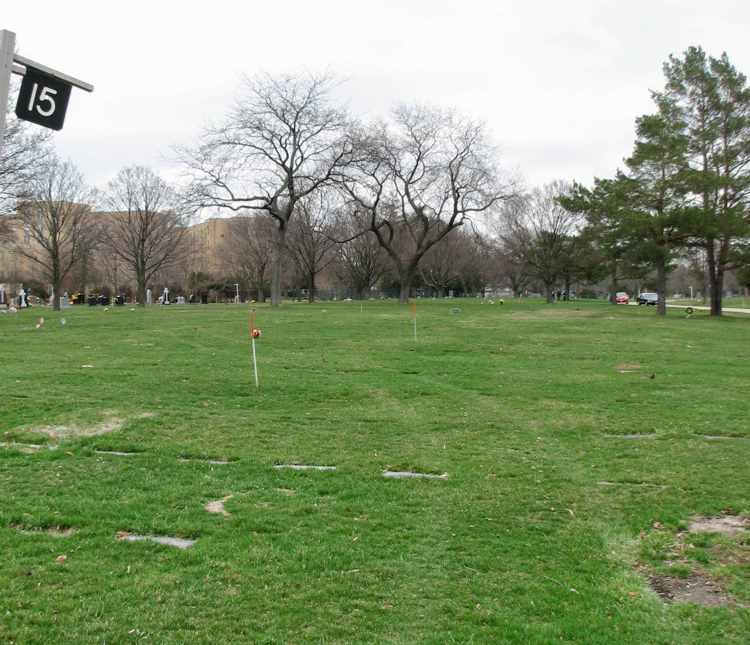
Part of St. Adalbert Cemetery, Molitor's resting place, in the northern Chicago suburb of Niles.

== See also ==
- Religious architecture
- Polish Cathedral style
