= St. Mary's Church (Beaverville, Illinois) =

Historic church in Illinois, United States

- U.S. National Register of Historic Places
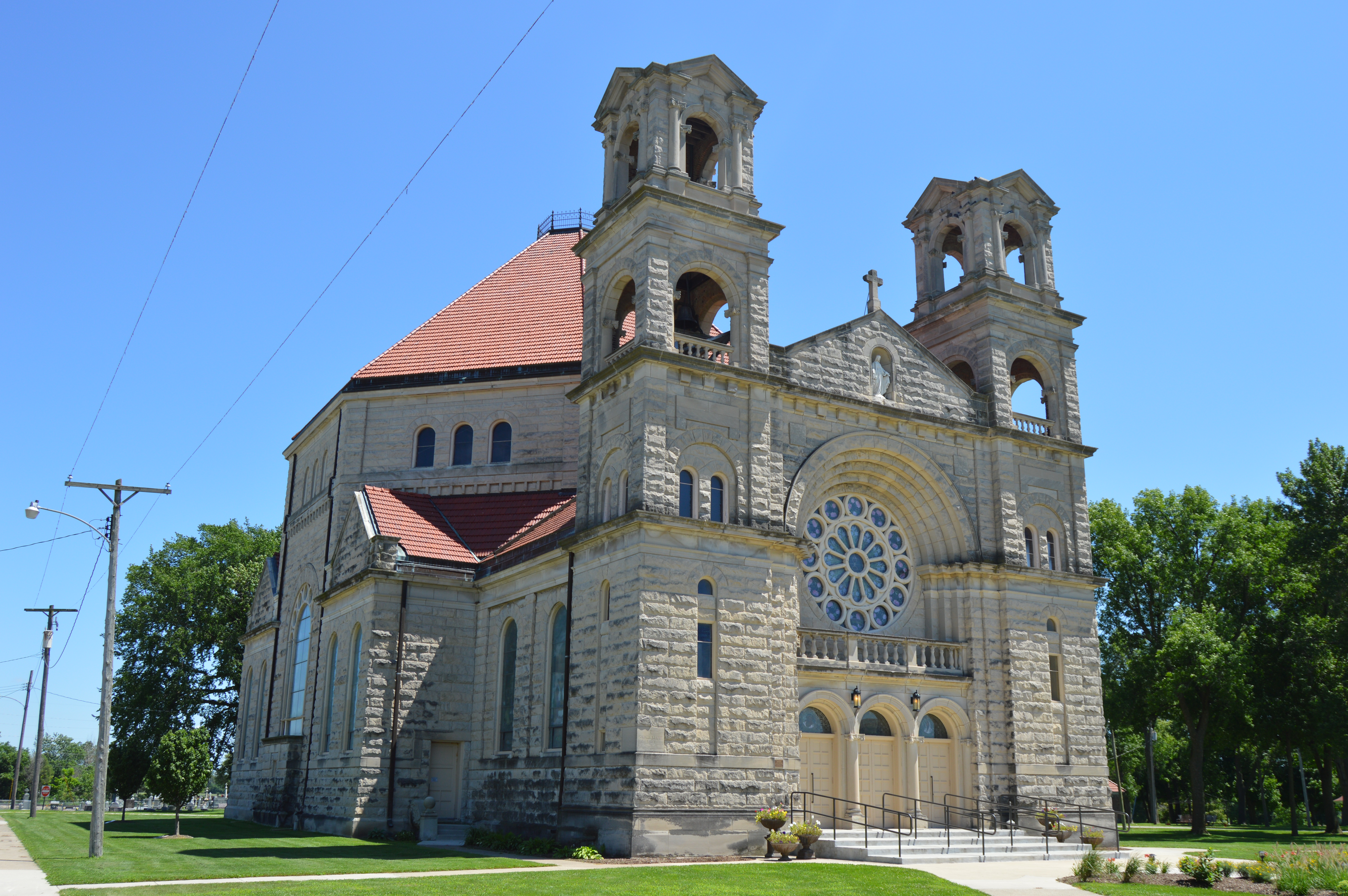
- St. Mary's Church, Beaverville, IL

- Location within Illinois Location within the United States
- Location: 308 St. Charles Avenue; Beaverville, Illinois
- Coordinates: 40°57′8″N 87°39′9″W
- Area: 15 acres (6.1 ha)
- Built: 1911
- Architect: Joseph Molitor
- Architectural style: Romanesque, Renaissance
- NRHP reference No.: 96000514
- Added to NRHP: May 2, 1996

St. Mary's Catholic Church, known as the "Prairie Cathedral" or the "Cathedral of the Cornfields", is a Roman Catholic church in Beaverville, Illinois. The Romanesque Revival church was built in 1909–1911. The church features two towers and a tiled dome roof; it is both the tallest and most prominent landmark in Beaverville. In 1996, the church was added to the National Register of Historic Places.

== Architecture ==
Prominent Chicago church architect Joseph Molitor designed the church in the Romanesque Revival style. The church was built using limestone blocks with a rough-cut exterior. The church has an L-shaped plan with a small wing in the back forming the leg. The building is both the tallest structure in Beaverville and the most visible landmark in the village.

The church's main entrance is located on its west side; the three sets of double doors are each topped by a stained glass transom. A pair of four-story towers are located on either side of the entrance. The third and fourth floors of each tower are open with pilasters framing the arched openings; balustrades run along the third-floor apertures, while the fourth-floor openings feature keystones and classical cornices. Triangular pediments are situated atop both towers.

The center of the church includes an octagonal section topped by a dome roof. The roof is composed of red French clay tiles. Each side of the octagon is 52 feet (16 m) long with a 32 feet (9.8 m) base. A small flat octagonal section at the top of the dome is fenced off by an iron railing. Seven secondary gable roofs cover the other parts of the church, while a smaller octagon tops the wing; these other roofs are also shingled with red tiles. Roughly 22,000 tiles were used to construct the church's roofs.

Each side of the church features seven arched stained glass windows on its first floor. Six windows on each side have the same dimensions, while a larger window is located in the base of the octagon. Each side of the octagon's second story includes three smaller windows. The wing includes five additional stained glass windows; two are located on each floor of the west side, while the fifth is on the east side's second story.

== History ==
The St. Mary's parish was established in 1857, when the village of Beaverville was known as St. Marie. The parish opened its own school in 1895 and established a convent the following year. Due to the parish's increasing congregation, construction began on the current church building in 1909. The new church was dedicated in 1911; however, the building's construction debts were not fully paid until 1945. After its debt was cleared, the congregation decorated the interior of the church; however, many of these decorations were lost to renovations in the 1970s. The parish's elementary and high schools closed in 1965 and 1969 respectively; Mass is still held in the church, however.
