= List of churches in the Archdiocese of Chicago – Vicariate I =

This is a list of current and former Roman Catholic churches in Vicariate I of the Roman Catholic Archdiocese of Chicago. Vicariate I covers Lake County, Illinois, and portions of northern Cook County. It includes the communities of Des Plaines, Elk Grove Village, Lake Forest, Mount Prospect, Mundelein, Schaumburg, and Waukegan. The vicariate is further subdivided into six regional areas, Deanery A through Deanery F.

== Deanery A: Mundelein area ==
| Name | Image | Location | Description/sources |
|---|---|---|---|
| Prince of Peace | | 135 S Milwaukee Ave, Lake Villa | Established in 1955 |
| St. Bede | | 36455 N Wilson Rd, Ingleside | Formed in the 1930s; combined in 2018 with St. Peter in Antioch to form Our Lady of Lakes parish |
| St. Francis de Sales | | 33 S. Buesching Rd, Lake Zurich | Established in 1948 as a mission |
| St. Gilbert | | 301 E Belvidere Rd, Grayslake | Dedicated in 1932 |
| St. Joseph | | 114 N Lincoln Ave, Round Lake | Established in 1911 |
| St. Mary of the Annunciation | | 22333 W Erhart Rd, Mundelein | |
| National Shrine of St. Maximilian Kolbe | | 1600 W Park Ave, Libertyville | Pilgrimage site, retreat center, and community of Franciscan friars |
| St. Peter | | 557 W Lake St, Antioch | Parish dates to 1897; combined in 2018 with St. Bede in Ingleside to form Our Lady of the Lakes parish |
| St. Peter | | 27551 Volo Village Rd, Volo | Began as a mission church in 1868 |
| St. Raphael the Archangel | | 40000 North US Hwy 45, Old Mill Creek | Church built in 2008 using portions of two closed Chicago Catholic churches, St. John of God (a Chicago landmark designed by Henry J. Schlacks) and St. Peter Canisius. |
| Santa Maria del Popolo | | 116 N Lake St, Mundelein | Includes Our Lady of Siluva Shrine |
| Transfiguration | | 316 W Mill St, Wauconda | Parish celebrated 175th anniversary in 2016; masses conducted in Polish |

== Deanery B: Waukegan area ==
| Name | Image | Location | Description/sources |
|---|---|---|---|
| Holy Family | | 450 Keller Ave, Waukegan | Part of Most Blessed Trinity Parish |
| Immaculate Conception | | 508 Grand Ave, Waukegan | Part of Most Blessed Trinity Parish |
| Our Lady of Humility | | 10655 W Wadsworth Rd, Beach Park | Established 1950 |
| Queen of Peace | | 910-14th St, Waukegan | Part of Most Blessed Trinity Parish |
| St. Anastasia | | 624 Douglas Ave, Waukegan | Established 1926; part of Little Flower Parish |
| St. Dismas | | 2600 Sunset Ave, Waukegan | Established 1963; part of Little Flower Parish |
| St. Patrick | | 15000 W Wadsworth Rd, Wadsworth | Parish traces roots to 1849 |
| St. Paul the Apostle | | 6401 Gages Lake Rd, Gurnee | |

== Deanery C: Lake Forest area ==
| Name | Image | Location | Description/sources |
|---|---|---|---|
| Holy Cross | | 724 Elder Ln, Deerfield | Established in 1929 |
| Immaculate Conception | | 770 Deerfield Rd, Highland Park | |
| St. James | | 135 North Ave, Highwood | |
| St. Joseph | | 121 E Maple Ave, Libertyville | |
| St. Mary | | 175 E Illinois Rd, Lake Forest | Established in 1844 as a mission church |
| St. Mary of Vernon | | 236 US Hwy 45, Indian Creek | Established in 1978 |
| St. Patrick | | 991 W Waukegan Rd, Lake Forest | Oldest church in Lake Forest; parish traces roots to 1839 |

== Deanery D: Arlington Heights area ==
| Name | Image | Location | Description/sources |
|---|---|---|---|
| Holy Family | | 2515 W Palatine Rd, Inverness | Established in 1984 |
| Mission San Juan Diego | | 2323 N Wilke Rd, Arlington Heights | Church serving the area's Mexican community |
| Our Lady of the Wayside | | 450 S Mitchell Ave, Arlington Heights | Founded in 1952 |
| St. Anne | | 120 N Ela St, Barrington | Original church (now used as a daily mass chapel) dedicated 1884 |
| St. Collette | | 3900 S Meadow Rd, Rolling Meadows | |
| St. Edna | | 2525 N Arlington Hts Rd, Arlington Heights | |
| St. James | | 820 N Arlington Hts Rd, Arlington Heights | |
| St. Joseph the Worker | | 181 W Dundee Rd, Wheeling | Established in 1957 |
| St. Mary | | 10 N Buffalo Grove Rd, Buffalo Grove | Old church built in 1899 with landmark steeple now a chapel; larger church built 1978 |
| St. Theresa | | 455 N Benton St, Palatine | Established as a mission 1930 |
| St. Thomas of Villanova | | 1201 E Anderson Dr, Palatine | Established in 1961 |

== Deanery E: Elk Grove and Schaumburg area ==
| Name | Image | Location | Description/sources |
|---|---|---|---|
| Holy Spirit | | 1451 W Bode Rd, Schaumburg | Established in 1974 |
| Queen of the Rosary | | 750 W Elk Grove Blvd, Elk Grove Village | Established in 1959 |
| St. Alphonsus Liguori | | 411 N Wheeling Rd, Prospect Heights | Established in 1956 |
| St. Ansgar | | 2040 Laurel Ave, Hanover Park | Established in 1968 |
| St. Hubert | | 729 Grand Canyon St, Hoffman Estates | Established in 1960, replacing "St Buggy Whip" |
| St. John the Evangelist | | 502 S Park Blvd, Streamwood | |
| St. Julian Eymard | | 601 Biesterfield Rd, Elk Grove Village | Established in 1968 |
| St. Marceline | | 822 S Springinsguth Rd, Schaumburg | Established in 1966 |
| St. Matthew | | 1001 E Schaumburg Rd, Schaumburg | Opened doors 1975 |
| St. Peter Damian | | 131 S Crest Ave, Bartlett | |

== Deanery F: Des Plaines and Mount Prospect area ==
| Name | Image | Location | Description/sources |
|---|---|---|---|
| Shrine of Our Lady of Guadalupe | | 1170 N River Rd, Des Plaines | Established in 1987 |
| St. Cecilia | | 700 S Meier Rd, Mt. Prospect | |
| St. Emily | | 1400 E Central Rd, Mt. Prospect | Established in 1960 |
| St. Mary | | 794 Pearson St, Des Plaines | Established as a permanent parish in 1906 |
| St. Paul Chong Hasang | | 675 Dursey Ln, Des Plaines | Korean Catholic mission named for 19th century Korean martyr Paul Chong Hasang |
| St. Raymond de Penafort | | 301 S I Oka Ave, Mt. Prospect | Established in 1949 |
| St. Stephen Protomartyr | | 1280 Prospect Ave, Des Plaines | |
| St. Thomas Becket | | 1321 N Burning Bush Ln, Mt. Prospect | |
| St. Zachary | | 567 W Algonquin Rd, Des Plaines | Established in 1962 |

== See also ==
- List of churches in the Roman Catholic Archdiocese of Chicago
