= Church of St. Vitus (Chicago) =

Former church in Chicago, Illinois, US

The Former St. Vitus' Roman Catholic Church Complex
- Interactive map of the The Former St. Vitus' Roman Catholic Church Complex area

General information
- Location: Pilsen, Chicago, Illinois, United States
- Coordinates: 41.8570°N 87.6688°W
- Construction started: 1896
- Completed: 1897
- Client: The Roman Catholic Archdiocese of Chicago

Technical details
- Structural system: Masonry

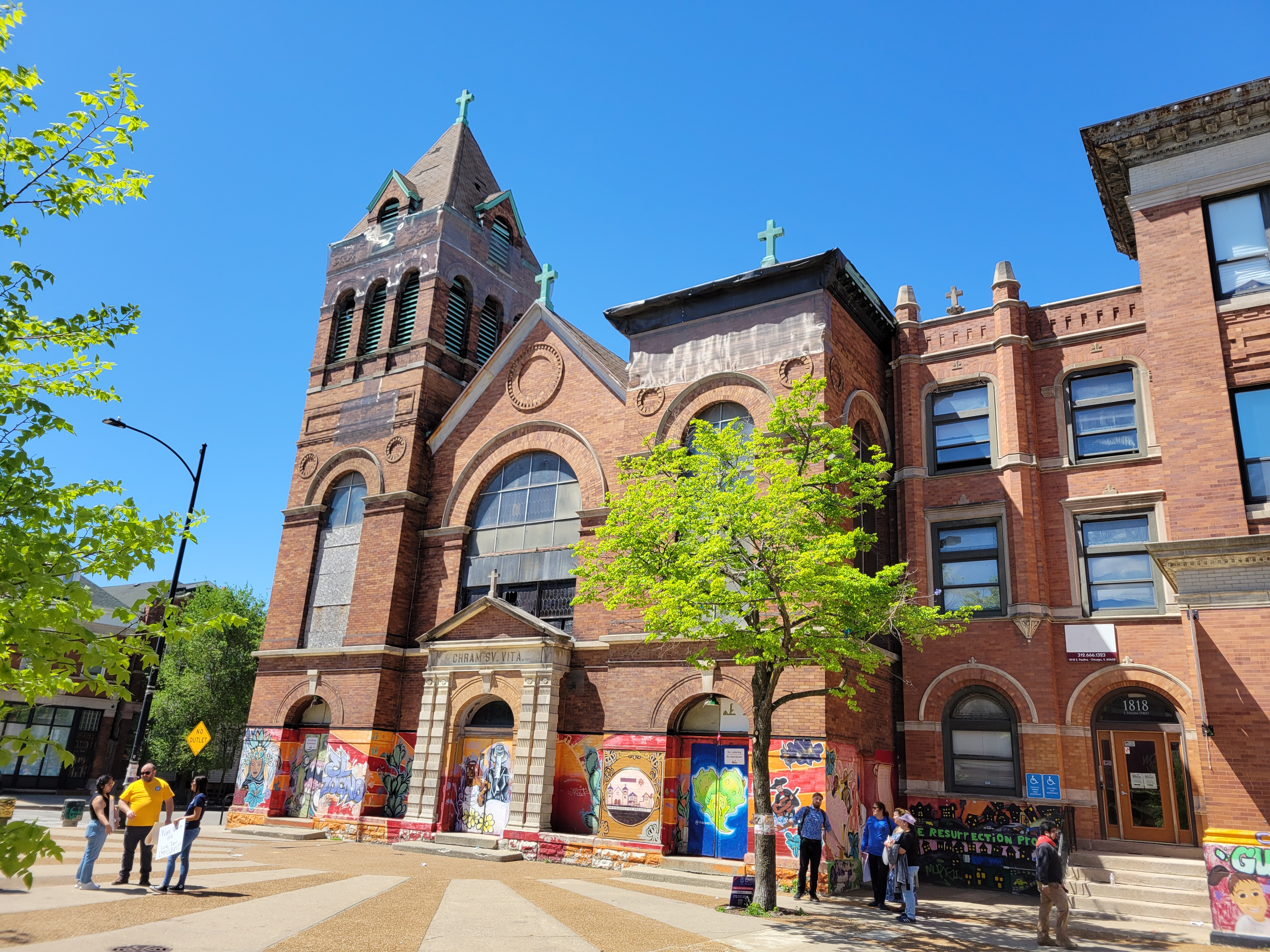

St. Vitus's Church Complex was a former late-nineteenth-century Roman Catholic church located in Pilsen, Chicago, Illinois, at 1814 South Paulina Street, and corner of 18th Street. The church itself was closed in 1990 and the rectory and remaining space adaptively reused as the Guadalupano Family Center, a daycare and cultural center thereafter.

The complex contained a 4,500-square-foot (420 m^{2}) church (1896–1897), rectory (1898), and parish school (1902). The complex was closed 1990. The National Trust for Historic Preservation profiled the structure as a good example of adaptive reuse: "A community task force collaborated with area interfaith organizations to develop a non-profit community development corporation called The Resurrection Project. This group was organized to specifically focus on developing and overseeing uses for the complex, as well as developing numerous low-income and affordable housing units and residences in the area." The church was renovated 1992–1996 as a "state-of-the-art day care facility was designed for the former parochial school, and plans are underway for a cultural center in the now hollow sanctuary space that was destroyed by a fire….The Resurrection Project operates one of the most active community reinvestment programs in the area from the [church]," costing $1.2 million for conversion of school and $400,000, anticipated repairs to church.

Its location in a Latino neighborhood enabled its large number of parishioners to work with the Roman Catholic Archdiocese of Chicago to explore reuse options with a team of architects, urban planners, historic preservationists, low-income housing specialists, commercial developers, and educators to create Guadalupano Family Center, a day care and cultural activity center. Opened in 1994, the child care facility "that operates on a sliding scale fee, serving the population of 6,000 children between 3 and 12 years of age living within 1/2 mile of the center. The center also employs a staff of 22 teachers."
