= Beaverville, Illinois =

- Village
- Location of Beaverville in Iroquois County, Illinois

- Beaverville's location in Iroquois County
- Coordinates: 40°57′12″N 87°39′17″W
- Country: United States
- State: Illinois
- County: Iroquois
- Township: Beaverville

Area
  - Total: 0.28 sq mi (0.72 km^{2})
  - Land: 0.27 sq mi (0.71 km^{2})
  - Water: 0.0039 sq mi (0.01 km^{2})
- Elevation: 673 ft (205 m)

Population (2020)
  - Total: 306
  - Density: 1,112.0/sq mi (429.33/km^{2})
- ZIP code: 60912
- Area code: 815
- FIPS code: 17-04507
- GNIS feature ID: 2398062

Beaverville (formerly St. Marie) is a village in Beaverville Township, Iroquois County, Illinois, United States. The population was 306 at the 2020 census.

== History ==
In 1851, 32 families from the area of Montreal, Canada, mostly newlywed or single, came up the St. Lawrence River in search of farmland on the prairie. They traveled across the Great Lakes and stopped at Fort Dearborn (Chicago). Then they pushed south through the swamps and frontier until they reached the area that is now Beaverville. The settlement, named "St. Marie," was led by Francis Besse, who became a general merchant. The group consisted of families with names such as Fortin, Dionne, Boudreau, Benoit, Nourie, Lafond, Lemna, and at least six Arseneau families. They settled here because of the good land and the many creeks.

In 1905, the village name was changed to "Beaverville", when the village founders realized that there was another town in Illinois named St. Mary. The new name was inspired by the profusion of beavers in the area in the early 19th century, when Beaver Lake right across the border in Indiana still existed.

== Geography ==
Beaverville is located in northeastern Iroquois County. It is 16 miles (26 km) northeast of Watseka, the county seat; 20 miles (32 km) southeast of Kankakee; and 7 miles (11 km) west of the Indiana border.

According to the 2021 census gazetteer files, Beaverville has a total area of 0.28 square miles (0.73 km^{2}), of which 0.28 square miles (0.73 km^{2}) (or 99.28%) is land and 0.00 square miles (0.00 km^{2}) (or 0.72%) is water.\

=== The Cathedral of the Cornfields ===
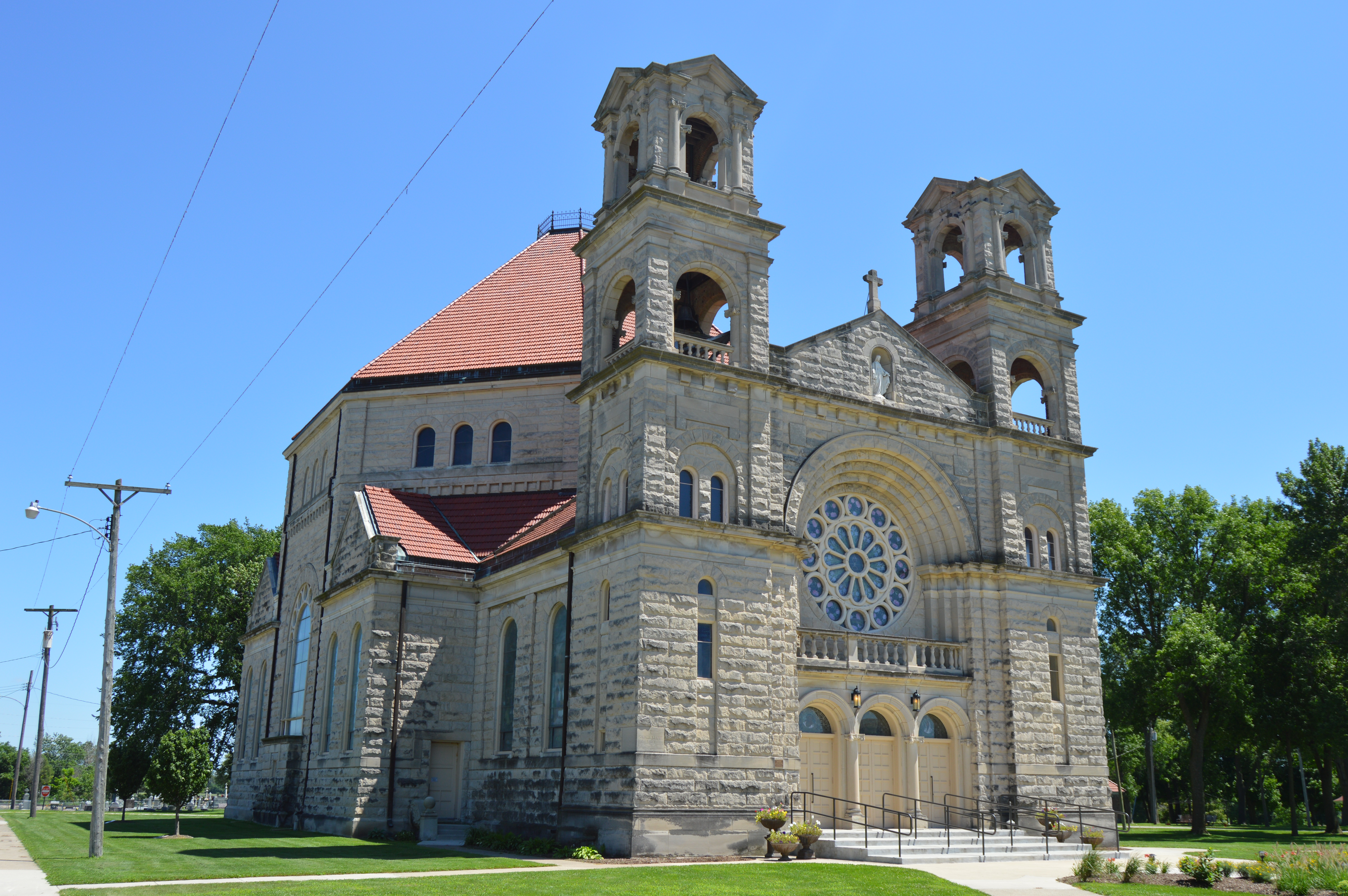
St. Mary's Church in Beaverville

Beaverville is home to St. Mary's Catholic Church, known as the "Prairie Cathedral" or the "Cathedral of the Cornfields". Built in 1909, the structure is recorded in the National Register of Historic Places and is large enough that its red, clay tile roof can be seen from several miles away.

== Demographics ==
Historical population
Census	Pop.	Note	%±
1900	395		—
1910	401		1.5%
1920	402		0.2%
1930	348		−13.4%
1940	425		22.1%
1950	383		−9.9%
1960	430		12.3%
1970	442		2.8%
1980	377		−14.7%
1990	278		−26.3%
2000	391		40.6%
2010	362		−7.4%
2020	306		−15.5%
U.S. Decennial Census

As of the 2020 census there were 306 people, 173 households, and 101 families residing in the village. The population density was 1,104.69 inhabitants per square mile (426.52/km^{2}). There were 143 housing units at an average density of 516.25 per square mile (199.33/km^{2}). The racial makeup of the village was 94.44% White, 0.33% African American, 0.00% Native American, 0.00% Asian, 0.00% Pacific Islander, 3.27% from other races, and 1.96% from two or more races. Hispanic or Latino of any race were 4.58% of the population.

There were 173 households, out of which 22.0% had children under the age of 18 living with them, 42.20% were married couples living together, 12.14% had a female householder with no husband present, and 41.62% were non-families. 40.46% of all households were made up of individuals, and 21.97% had someone living alone who was 65 years of age or older. The average household size was 2.77 and the average family size was 2.14.

The village's age distribution consisted of 20.5% under the age of 18, 6.5% from 18 to 24, 18.7% from 25 to 44, 27% from 45 to 64, and 27.3% who were 65 years of age or older. The median age was 49.9 years. For every 100 females, there were 97.9 males. For every 100 females age 18 and over, there were 86.1 males.

The median income for a household in the village was $49,464, and the median income for a family was $57,404. Males had a median income of $44,500 versus $35,536 for females. The per capita income for the village was $23,676. About 5.9% of families and 15.7% of the population were below the poverty line, including 13.2% of those under age 18 and 24.8% of those age 65 or over.
