= St. Joseph Roman Catholic Church (Chicago) =

Coordinates: 41°48′23.9″N 87°40′06″W

St. Joseph Church
- Saint Joseph Polish Roman Catholic Church
- Polski Kościół Rzymskokatolicki Świętego Józefa
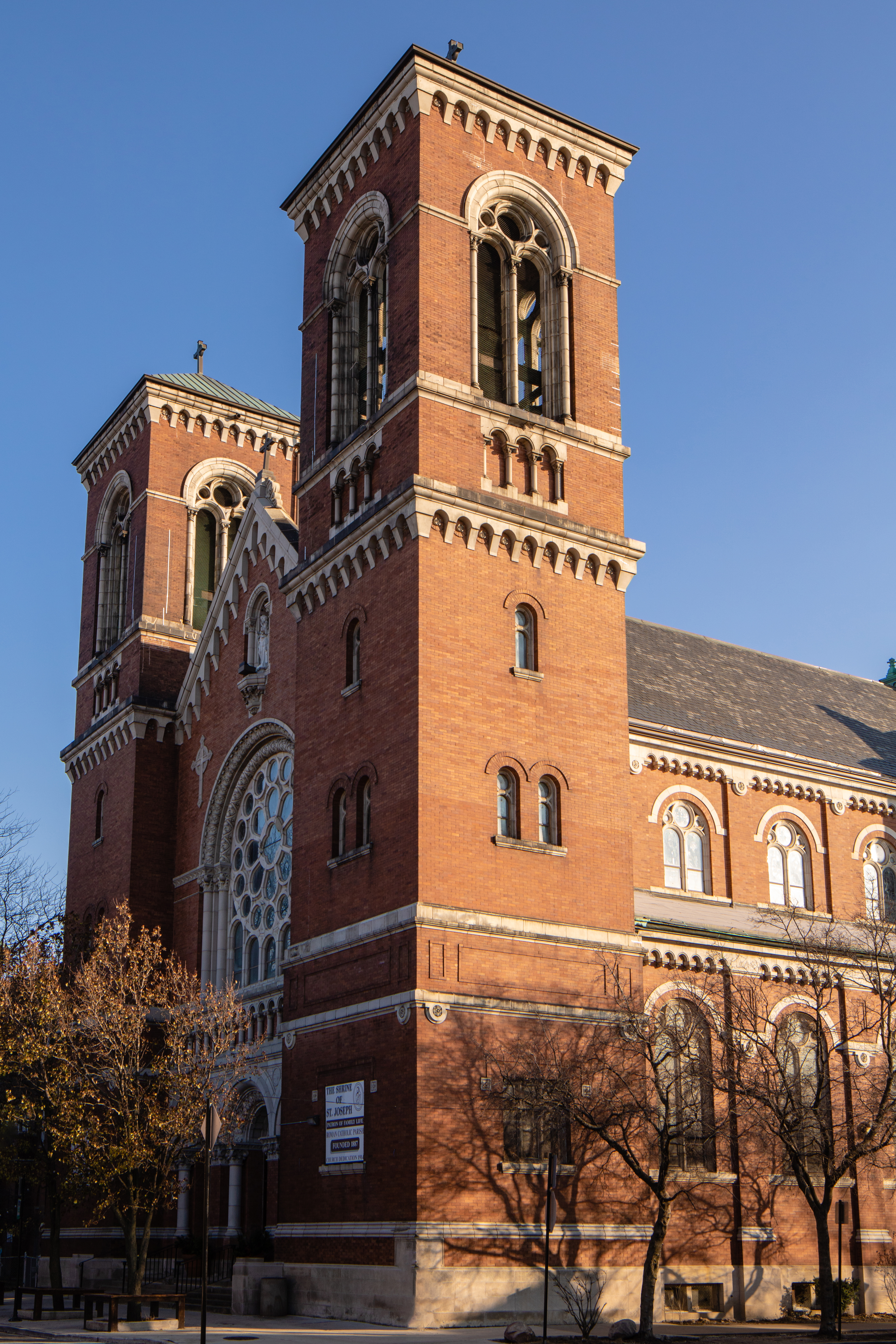
- A view of St. Joseph looking southeast from the northwest corner of 48th and Hermitage

- Location: 4821 South Hermitage Avenue; Chicago
- Country: United States
- Denomination: Roman Catholic

History
- Founded: 1887
- Founder: Polish immigrants
- Dedication: St. Joseph
- Dedicated: December 19, 1886

Architecture
- Functional status: Active
- Heritage designation: For Polish immigrants
- Architect: Joseph Molitor
- Architectural type: Church
- Style: Baroque
- Groundbreaking: September 10, 1913
- Completed: 1914
- Construction cost: $200,000 (1914)

Specifications
- Capacity: 1,200
- Materials: Brick, Stone

Administration
- Province: Ecclesiastical Province of Chicago
- Archdiocese: Roman Catholic Archdiocese of Chicago
- Diocese: Roman Catholic Diocese of Chicago
- Parish: Saint Joseph Parish

Clergy
- Pastor(s): Fr. Ernesto Caicedo, MSC

St. Joseph's (Polish: Kościół Świętego Józefa) is a historic church of the Roman Catholic Archdiocese of Chicago located in Chicago, Illinois, at 4821 South Hermitage Avenue. Founded in 1887 with the current church building dating to 1914, Saint Joseph's is a prime example of the Polish Cathedral style of churches in both its opulence and grand scale. Along with St. John of God and Holy Cross, it is one of three monumental religious edifices that dominates the skyline of the Back of the Yards neighborhood. The parish survived archdiocesan budget cuts in 1990, and, in 2021, was merged with several local churches into a single parish. Today, St. Joseph serves a multicultural community.

== History ==
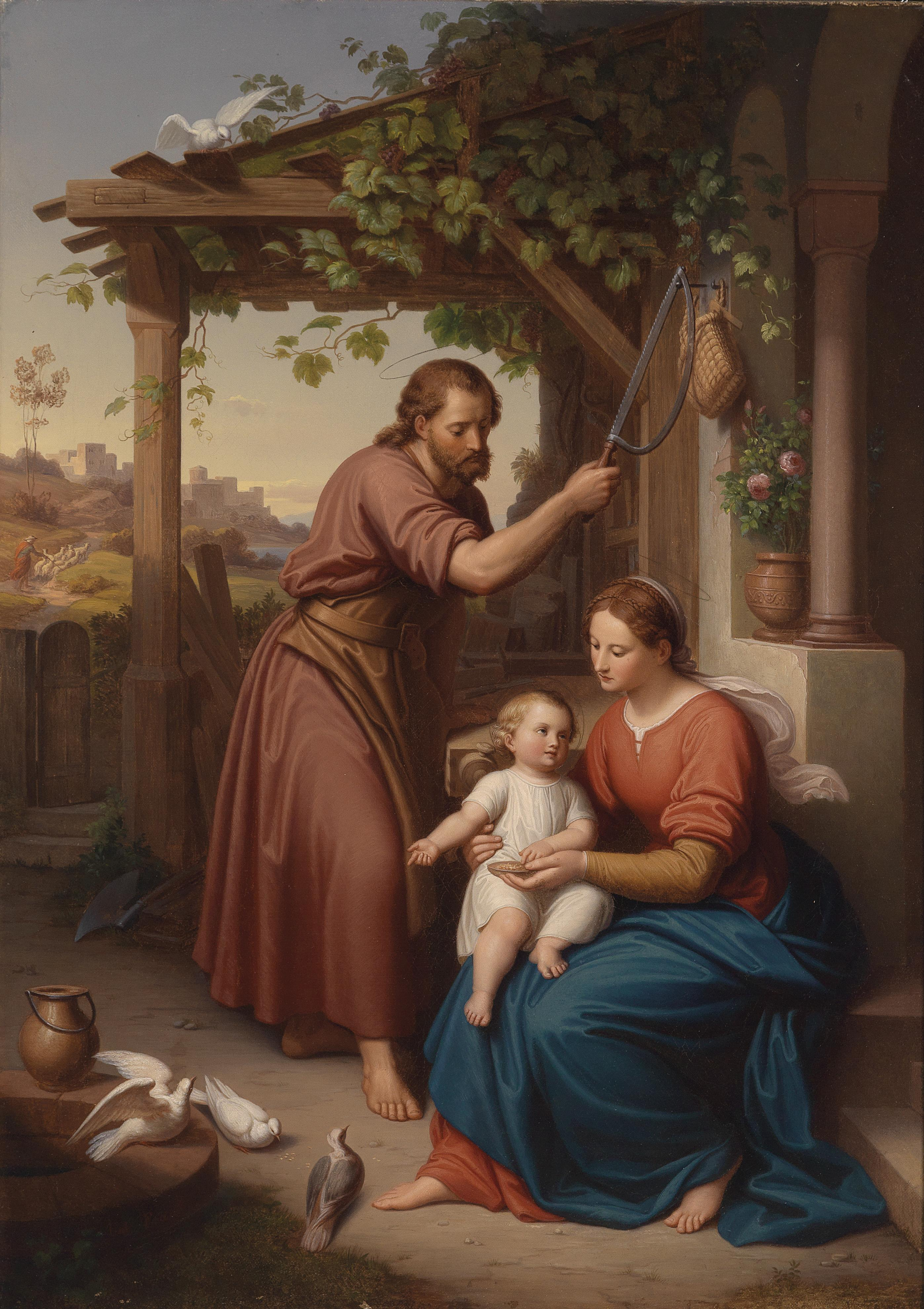
The Holy Family. St. Joseph Church is named after Saint Joseph, Jesus's adoptive father on Earth.

Initially a mission of St. Mary of Perpetual Help, St. Joseph's was organized in 1887 as the first Polish parish in the Back of the Yards. Its patron saint proved very appropriate as the parish long served a congregation of immigrant workers near the Union Stockyards. In the beginning of the 20th century, the Polish population in the Back of the Yards increased so greatly that two other Polish parishes were formed from St. Joseph's parish—St. John of God, in 1906, and Sacred Heart, in 1910. Like most of the Poles who settled in Chicago's Southwest Side, many of the first parishioners of St. Joseph's were Gorals, or Polish Highlanders, from the Carpathian Mountains. In 1914, the current church building was officially dedicated. In the early 1950s, the church was redecorated by artist John A. Mallin. Although the Union Stockyards, a major employer in the area, closed in the early 1970s and some Polish immigrants subsequently left Back of the Yards, St. Joseph's still celebrates mass in Polish.

In 1990, St. Joseph was one of four Back of the Yards parishes to survive diocesan budget cuts. The others - Sacred Heart of Jesus at 4600 South Honore Street, St. Rose of Lima Church at 1546 West 48th Street, Sts. Cyril and Methodius at 5009 South Hermitage, and St. Augustine Church at 5045 South Laflin, closed that year. In 1996, restoration works at St. Joseph's were initiated. The following year, the status of shrine was given to St. Joseph Church. In 1998, the Shrine of Saint Joseph, Patron of Family Life, was officially dedicated. In 2000, St. Joseph's restoration was completed, and on June 4 of that year, the Shrine of Saint Joseph was rededicated.

St. Joseph celebrated its 125th anniversary with a Mass and celebration on September 1, 2012. In 2015, the parish received a relic of Pope John Paul II, recognised as a saint by the Catholic Church. For many years, a dirt lot occupied the spot where a convent once stood. In August 2015, when the new St. Joseph Plaza, adorned with a paver stone rosary, was inaugurated in its place. Two years later, on March 19, 2017, the parish received a relic of Saint Joseph. In October 2017, the parish celebrated its 130th anniversary. To commemorate the event, a procession involving three religious images of the Virgin Mary - Our Lady of Zapopan, Our Lady of Talpa, and Our Lady of San Juan de los Lagos - was held. Other events, including a peace walk and an outdoor mass, were held to mark the occasion. On February 10, 2019, the formal installation mass for the church's current pastor was held. In 2021, the church was united with two nearby parishes, St. Michael and Holy Cross - Immaculate Heart of Mary, into Holy Cross and SS. Mary, Joseph, and Michael Parish as part of an archdiocesan Renew My Church planning process.

== St. Joseph's today ==
In 2012, Saint Joseph's parishioners were 75% Mexican-American, with the remaining 25% consisting of Americans, Polish-Americans, and African-Americans. St. Joseph's offers mass every day of the week, with services in Polish, English, and Spanish.

=== Mass Schedule ===
This is a schedule listing the services held at St. Joseph Church as of Summer 2020. All times listed are local.

Mass Schedule for Saint Joseph Church
Language	Sunday	Monday	Tuesday	Wednesday	Thursday	Friday	Saturday
Polish	10:30 a.m.						
English	9:00 a.m.	7:30 a.m.	7:30 a.m.	7:30 a.m.	7:30 a.m.	7:30 a.m.	7:30 a.m.
Spanish	7:30 a.m.,12:30 p.m., 5:30 p.m.						

== Architecture ==
The initial church structure is now Saint John Paul II Hall. The current Baroque church was designed by Joseph Molitor in 1914 with a seating capacity of 1,200. Molitor also created the plans for two neighboring Roman Catholic churches in the Back of the Yards neighborhood of Chicago founded by Eastern European immigrants—Holy Cross Church which served a Lithuanian congregation and the now-closed Sts. Cyril and Methodius Church, constructed by a Bohemian congregation.

== St. Joseph's in architecture books ==
=== Books on Chicago architecture ===
- Sinkevitch, Alice (2004). The AIA Guide to Chicago. Harvest Books.
- Schulze, Franz; Harrington, Kevin (2003). Chicago's Famous Buildings. University Of Chicago Press.

=== Books on church architecture ===
- McNamara, Denis R. (2005). Heavenly City: The Architectural Tradition of Catholic Chicago. Liturgy Training Publications.
- Chiat, Marylin (2004). The Spiritual Traveler: Chicago and Illinois: A Guide to Sacred Sites and Peaceful Places. HiddenSpring.
- Lane, George A. (1982). Chicago Churches and Synagogues: An Architectural Pilgrimage. Loyola Press.
- Kantowicz, Edward R. (2007). The Archdiocese of Chicago: A Journey of Faith. Booklink.
- Kociolek, Jacek (2002). Kościoły Polskie w Chicago {Polish Churches of Chicago} (in Polish). Ex Libris.

== See also ==
- Polish Cathedral style churches of Chicago
- Polish Americans
- Poles in Chicago
- Roman Catholicism in Poland
