= Sacred Heart Church (Chicago) =

Church building in United States of America

Coordinates: 41°43′16.6″N 87°33′12.6″W

Sacred Heart Church is a historic church, part of the Roman Catholic Archdiocese of Chicago, located in the South Deering neighborhood in Chicago, United States. It is located at 2864 East 96th Street. The church services are in Croatian and English.

== History ==
Sacred Heart parish was founded in 1913 which was the third Croatian parish in Chicago. Before the foundation of Sacred Heart the Croatians of South Chicago belong to the Slovene Parish of St. George at 96th and Ewing. Sacred Heart opened on Christmas Day 1913. It was dedicated on May 17, 1914 by Archbishop James E. Quigley. The church building had four schoolrooms with a total capacity for 200 children.

Rev. Ivan A. Stipanvic was the first pastor of Sacred Heart Croatian Church. Under his administration a school opened with the Sisters of St. Francis of Christ The King of Lemont, Illinois.

At the parish's Golden Jubilee celebrated on November 10, 1963 construction was begun on a new church. The dedication ceremony took place on June 21, 1964. The brick structure at 96th and Escanaba was designed by the architectural firm of Fox & Fox. Today the parish of Sacred Heart has over 600 families and a membership which includes families of Croatian descent who have been in the South Chicago area for years as well as Polish and Hispanic families who have been attending services as well.
