= Holy Cross Church (Chicago) =

Coordinates: 41.8108°N 87.6691°W

- Holy Cross Lithuanian Roman Catholic Church
- Šventojo Kryžiaus Lietuvos Romos Katalikų Bažnyčia
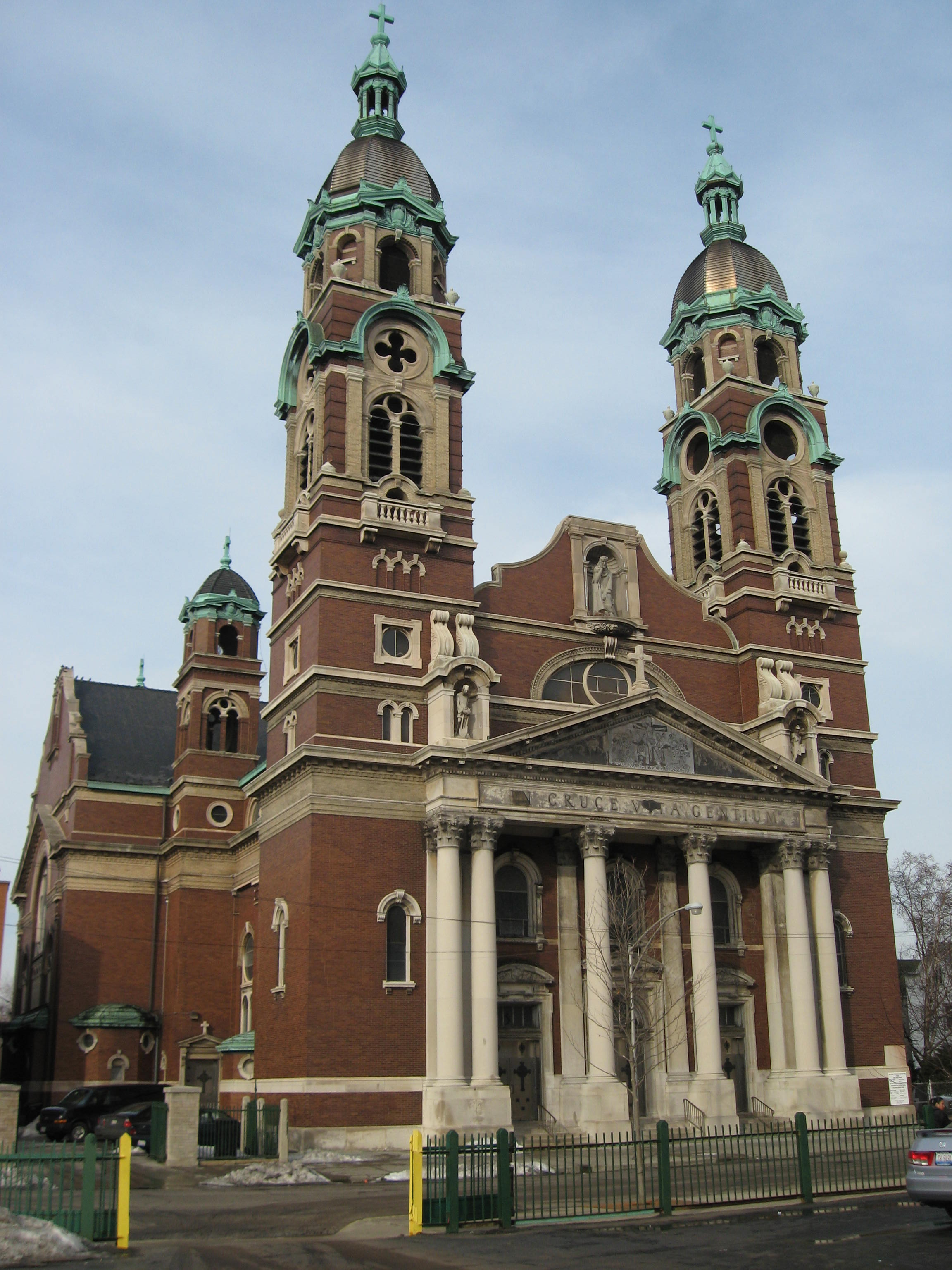
- A view of Holy Cross's front facade and entrance
- Holy Cross Church (Chicago)
- Location: 1740 West 46th Street Chicago, Illinois
- Country: United States
- Denomination: Roman Catholic

History
- Status: Active
- Founder: Lithuanian immigrants
- Dedication: The Holy Cross

Architecture
- Architect: Joseph Molitor
- Architectural type: Church
- Style: Baroque
- Years built: 1904–1915
- Groundbreaking: 1904
- Completed: 1915

Specifications
- Length: 172.37 ft [CONVERT]
- Width: 131.12 ft [CONVERT]
- Materials: Brick and marble

Administration
- Province: Ecclesiastical Province of Chicago
- Archdiocese: Roman Catholic Archdiocese of Chicago
- Diocese: Roman Catholic Diocese of Chicago
- Parish: Holy Cross – Immaculate Heart of Mary Parish

Clergy
- Priest: Fr. Jose del Carmen Mendez

Holy Cross Church (Chicago), referred to in Lithuanian as Šv. Kryžiaus Bažnyčia, is a historic church of the Roman Catholic Archdiocese of Chicago located on West 46th Street in Chicago, Illinois. Built by Lithuanian immigrants, it bears a striking resemblance to many of Chicago's so-called "Polish Cathedrals" by virtue of the common heritage Poles and Lithuanians shared during the Polish–Lithuanian Commonwealth and reflected in their architectural tastes. Holy Cross merged with the nearby Immaculate Heart of Mary Church on 45th and Ashland to make one parish, Holy Cross – Immaculate Heart of Mary. In 2021, the parish was further united with two nearby churches.

== History ==
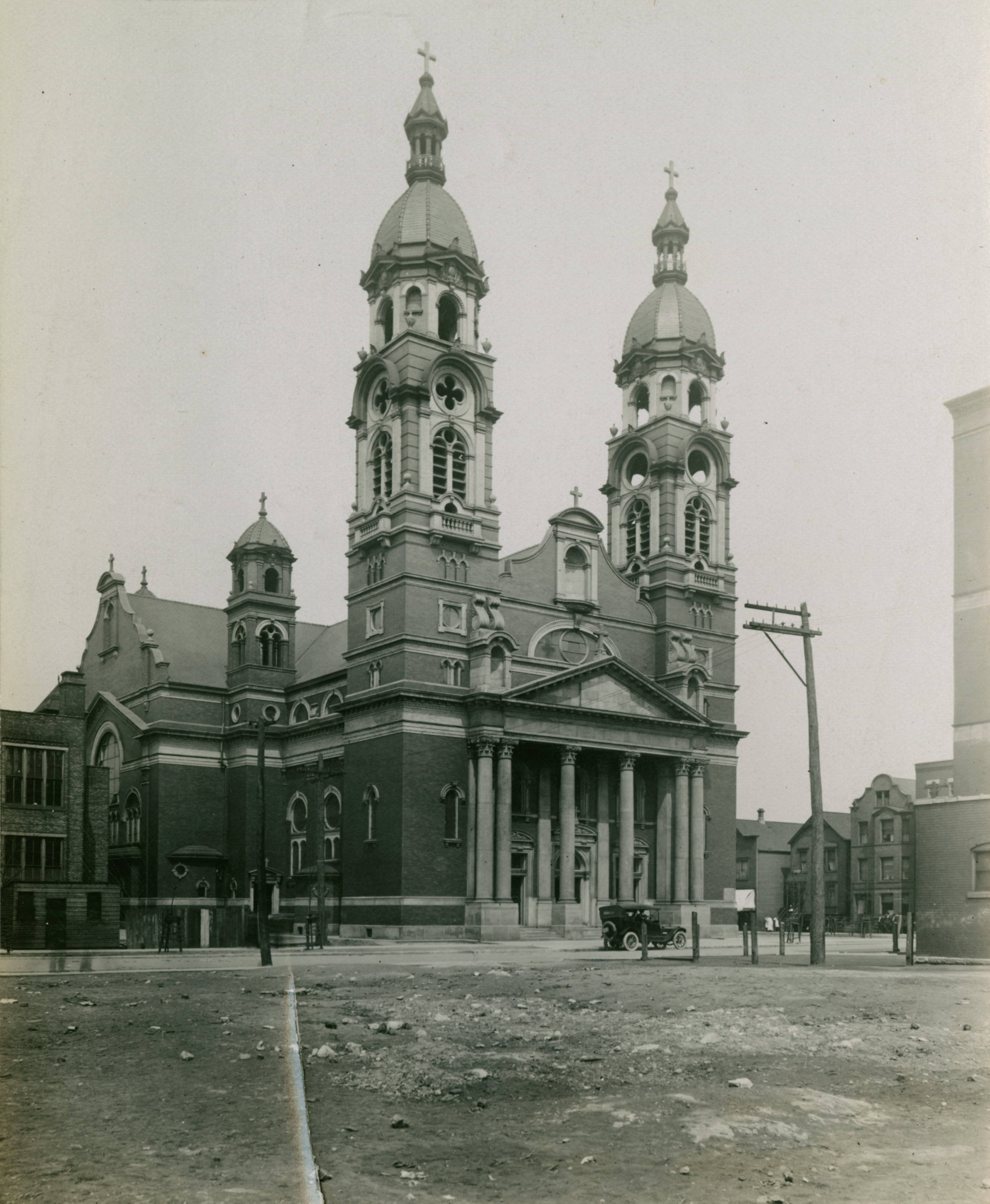
Holy Cross Church in 1914, just before it was completed.

At the turn of the 20th century, immigrants from Lithuania had been settling down in the Back of the Yards area for over a decade. Between 1870 and 1880, around 10,000 residents moved to Lake Township (referred to as "Taunleikis" by Lithuanians). Even after the township ceased to exist when it was annexed to the City of Chicago in 1889, new residents continued settling in the area, which was economically tied to the Union Stock Yards. Lithuanian immigrants formed a distinct settlement in the vicinity of the intersection of 47th Street and Ashland Avenue, in addition to the blocks northwest of that intersection.

By February 6, 1902, a group of Lithuanians formed the Society of St. Vincent Ferrer. A committee, consisting of Lithuanians, was created, and the group approached Archbishop Quigley with a desire to create a Lithuanian parish. Quigley agreed to the request, and on February 1, 1904, ten lots on 46th Street between Hermitage and Wood Streets were purchased by the Society of St Vincent Ferrer. On June 16, 1904, Alexander Skrypko started organizing the new parish. Holy Cross was founded in 1904 as a "national parish" for Lithuanians in Chicago living in the Back of the Yards area, most of whom were employed at the nearby Union Stock Yards. By 1909, Skyrpko, referred to as "Skripka", was being assisted by Reverend Ezerskis. On October 26, 1913, Quigley laid the new church's cornerstone. The church was completed in 1915, and the first mass celebrated in it occurred on Wednesday, September 15, 1915, the feast day of Our Lady of Sorrows. The parish fell on hard times in the 1970s after the closure of the stockyards, resulting in a merger with the neighboring parish of The Immaculate Heart of Mary. In 2004 the parish celebrated its 100-year anniversary, and in 2021, the parish was united with two nearby churches, St. Joseph and St. Michael, into Holy Cross and SS. Mary, Joseph, and Michael Parish as part of an archdiocesan Renew My Church planning process.

Today, the parish is largely Latino and uses both churches for worship as well as a wide variety of activities, with around 3,000 parishioners turning out for mass each weekend.

== Holy Cross today ==
Today, mass at Holy Cross is held 2 days each week, with other services held at the nearby Immaculate Heart of Mary Church. Currently, only Spanish language services are given at Holy Cross. The church previously held services in English, but these services are now mainly given in Immaculate Heart of Mary.

=== Mass schedule ===
This is a schedule listing the services held at Holy Cross as of Summer 2020. Note that the services held at Immaculate Heart of Mary Church are not included in this list. All times listed are local.

Mass Schedule for Holy Cross Church
Language	Sunday	Monday	Tuesday	Wednesday	Thursday	Friday	Saturday
Spanish Only	11:30 am*			6:30 p.m.			

The Sunday service marked with an asterisk (*) includes music that is performed by the local Children's Choir and the Marimba Ensemble.

== Architecture ==
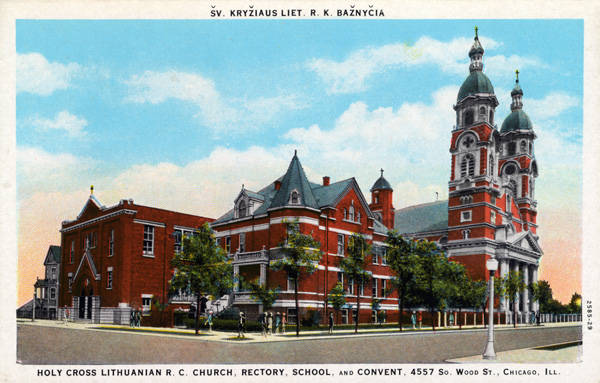
Color image of Holy Cross in 1929, when the structure had been open for just 15 years. The church (right), the parochial school (left), and the clergy residence (center) are depicted in this particular view.

The Baroque church, designed by Joseph Molitor, was completed in 1915. Chicago's Lithuanian churches were designed in the spirit of the architecture of the Polish–Lithuanian Commonwealth as a statement affirming Lithuania's culture, and reaffirming ties to their former homeland. Its twin towers soar above the working class houses and two-flats of the Back of the Yards neighborhood. The church features bell towers, domes and ceramic tiles on the floor imported from Lithuania. The church is covered with paintings, statues, and stained glass windows. The ornate Stations of the Cross are by renowned painter Thaddeus von Zukotynski, whose work at the church was later restored by Chicago artist Sr. Mary Stanisia. A lofty dome covers the church's vast interior that was richly decorated in 1951 by Lithuanian artists who had sought refuge from the Soviet Union. Most notable among them was Adolfas Valeška who executed four oil paintings that depict scenes from Lithuanian and American history. The vaulted ceiling is supported by marble columns located near the walls and it is lined with more than 2,000 light bulbs that brighten the church, each within a rosette. The brightly colored stained glass windows were installed in 1943 and 1944 by the Chicago firm of Arthur Michaudel depicting scenes from the life of Christ and a number of saints. There are also two choir lofts as well as an organ with over 1,700 pipes. The church's architecture helped ease the transition from predominantly Lithuanian to Latin American immigrant congregations since both ethnic groups would have found the Baroque stylings familiar to churches in their own countries of origin.

Holy Cross's architect, Joseph Molitor, also drew up the plans for two neighboring Roman Catholic churches in the Back of the Yards area of Chicago founded by Eastern European immigrants: St. Joseph's church for Poles and the now-closed Sts. Cyril and Methodius Church for Bohemians.

== Holy Cross in architecture books ==
Holy Cross is featured in a number of books on Chicago architecture and church architecture. The following is a list of books that feature Holy Cross's architecture.

=== Books on Chicago architecture ===
- The AIA Guide to Chicago by Alice Sinkevitch (Harvest Books 2004)

=== Books on church architecture ===
- Chicago Churches and Synagogues: An Architectural Pilgrimage by George A. Lane (Loyola University Press 1982)
- The Spiritual Traveler: Chicago and Illinois: A Guide to Sacred Sites and Peaceful Places by Marylin Chiat (Hidden Spring 2004)
- Heavenly City: The Architectural Tradition of Catholic Chicago by Denis R. McNamara (Liturgy Training Publications 2005)
- The Archdiocese of Chicago: A Journey of Faith by Edward R. Kantowicz (Booklink 2007)

== See also ==
- Polish Cathedral style churches of Chicago
