= St. Edward's Parish (Chicago) =

Catholic church, rectory convent and parish school in Chicago

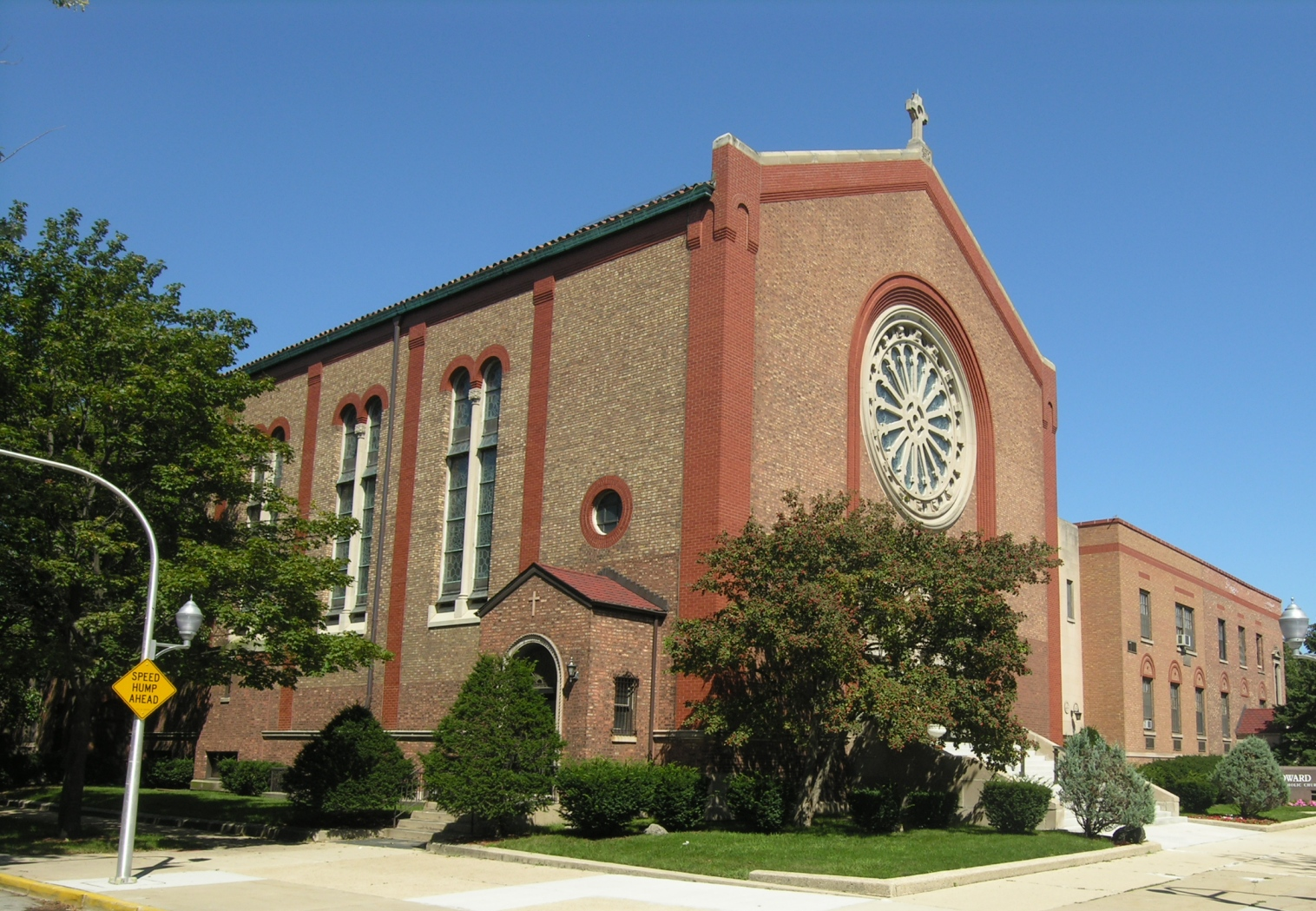

Location
- 4350 W Sunnyside Ave, Chicago, Illinois 60630; United States
- Coordinates: 41.9628994°N 87.7375708°W

Information
- Type: Catholic Parish
- Religious affiliation: Roman Catholic
- Patron saint: Edward the Confessor
- Established: 10 December 1899
- Founder: Rev. Thomas J. McCormick, C.S.V.
- Principal: Sarah Lasica
- Staff: Cathy McGill
- Grades: K-8 school
- Gender: Co-educational
- Enrollment: 1,336 in 1966
- Language: English
- Colors: Red and white (athletics) / Blue and gold (education)
- Affiliation: Roman Catholic Archdiocese of Chicago
- Website: www.stedparish.org

St. Edward's Parish is a Roman Catholic church, rectory, convent and coeducational grammar school located on the northwest side of Chicago founded in 1899. It is within the Roman Catholic Archdiocese of Chicago.

== Pastors ==
- Rev. Thomas J. McCormick, C.S.V. (1899–1903)
- Rev. J. J. Cregan, C.S.V. (1903–1916)
- Rev. Thomas J. McCormick, C.S.V. (1916–1918)
- Rev. John J. Corbett, C.S.V.(1918–1931)
- Rev. John J. O'Hearn (1931–1951)
- Rev. Cornelius J. Corkery (1951–1955)
- Rt. Rev. Msgr. John W. Schmid (1955–1967)
- Rev. Albert J. Buckley (1967–1981)
- Rev. John J. Donahue (1981–1991)
- Rev. John M. Murphy (1992–2004)
- Rev. Edward A. Carlson (2004–2010)
- Rev. Michael J. Cronin (2010 to 2019)
- Rev. Dominic Clemente (2019 to present)
