= Immaculate Heart of Mary Church (Chicago) =

Coordinates: 41°48′42.2″N 87°39′52.7″W

- Immaculate Heart of Mary Roman Catholic Church
- Iglesia Católica del Inmaculado Corazón de María
- Immaculate Heart of Mary Church
- Location: 4515 South Ashland Avenue, Chicago, Illinois
- Denomination: Roman Catholic

History
- Status: Active
- Founder: Mexican immigrants
- Dedication: Immaculate Heart of Mary
- Dedicated: December 30, 1945

Architecture
- Architectural type: Church

Specifications
- Materials: Wood and Brick

Administration
- Province: Ecclesiastical Province of Chicago
- Archdiocese: Roman Catholic Archdiocese of Chicago
- Diocese: Roman Catholic Diocese of Chicago
- Parish: Holy Cross - Immaculate Heart of Mary Parish

Immaculate Heart of Mary (Spanish: Inmaculado Corazon de Maria) is a church of the Roman Catholic Archdiocese of Chicago located on South Ashland Avenue near 45th Street in Chicago, Illinois. The church was constructed more recently, compared other places of worship in the Back of the Yards area, such as St. Joseph Roman Catholic Church or Holy Cross Church. The church, along with Holy Cross, formed part of the Holy Cross - Immaculate Heart of Mary Parish, which was in turn merged with two nearby churches into a new parish in 2021.

== History ==
=== Founding the parish ===
In the latter half of the 1930s, the workforce involvement and population as a whole of Mexican immigrants increased across the United States as the socioeconomic effects of the Great Depression started wearing down. The steady increase of their population lead to mass being given on storefront "chapels" due to the lack of a physical church for the Spanish-speaking community. Claretian priests from St. Francis of Assisi Church were traveling to the area on Sundays to give mass. In 1941, a former butcher shop was rented and outfitted as the Our Lay of Guadalupe chapel. For the next three years, Reverend Aloysius Dot, CMF, served the Mexican community in Back of the Yards. Donations eventually helped the community gain a permanent place of worship.

On March 5, 1944, the Our Lady of Guadalupe parish was relocated to 45th and Ashland, just a couple of blocks away from its original location. The new facility consisted of four storefront locations which were purchased by Reverend James F. Tort, CMF, Reverend Joachin DePrada, CMF, and the Archdiocesan Chancery Office. Archbishop Samuel A. Stritch encouraged Father Tort to enlarge the new chapel by completing $20,000 worth of renovations. Father Tort complied with the request and on December 30, 1945, Archbishop Stritch dedicated the church. Eventually, it was renamed to the Immaculate Heart of Mary Church. From August 1, 1947 onward, daily mass was celebrated in the church, with Reverend Raymond Sunye, CMF, as pastor. The church currently offers regular services consisting of both weekday and weekend masses.

=== Recent times ===
In 1990, the Archbishop of Chicago, Cardinal Joseph Bernardin, closed 40 Catholic churches and schools in an effort to save resources with which to pay off the Archdiocese's debt. Several schools in Back of the Yards, like St. Rose of Lima, were closed, increasing attendance at the remaining churches.

The population of Mexicans had still shown no signs of slowing down, especially in the latter half of the twentieth century. With the growing population of the neighborhood, Immaculate Heart of Mary was not big enough to accommodate all of the people. It eventually merged with Holy Cross Church to form a single parish, Holy Cross - Immaculate Heart of Mary, with both locations still being used for worship to this day. In 2021, the parish was united with two nearby churches, St. Michael and St. Joseph, into Holy Cross and SS. Mary, Joseph, and Michael Parish as part of an archdiocesan Renew My Church planning process.

== Immaculate Heart of Mary today ==
Today, mass at Immaculate Heart of Mary is held five days each week, with other services held at the nearby Holy Cross Church.

=== Mass Schedule ===
This is a schedule listing the services held at Immaculate Heart of Mary as of Summer 2020. Note that the services held at Holy Cross Church are not included in this list. All times listed are local.

Mass Schedule for Immaculate Heart of Mary Church
Language	Sunday	Monday	Tuesday	Wednesday	Thursday	Friday	Saturday
English Only	10:00 a.m.						
Spanish Only	8:30 a.m.						5:30 p.m.
Bilingual (English and Spanish)			8:30 a.m.*		8:30 a.m.	8:30 a.m.	

All services marked with an asterisk (*) are "Liturgies of the Word".
