= Wiesław Śpiewak =

Polish-born Bermudian Roman Catholic prelate

The Most Reverend Wiesław Śpiewak C.R.
- Diocesan Bishop of Hamilton in Bermuda
- Church: Catholic Church
- Appointed: 13 June 2015
- Predecessor: Robert Kurtz
- Successor: Incumbent
- Previous post: Provincial Superior of the Resurrectionists in Poland (2010–2015)

Orders
- Ordination: 19 May 1990 (Priest) by Stanisław Smoleński
- Consecration: 1 October 2015 (Bishop) by Robert Kurtz

Personal details
- Born: Wiesław Śpiewak; 19 October 1963 (age 62) Kraków, Poland
- Education: Pontifical Gregorian University, Academy of Theology in Kraków, Salesian Pontifical University

Wiesław Śpiewak, C.R. (born 19 October 1963) is a Polish-born Bermudian Catholic prelate who has served as Bishop of Hamilton in Bermuda since 2015. He is a member of the Resurrectionists.

== Education ==
Bishop Śpiewak was born into a Polish Catholic family in Kraków and was parishioner of the Resurrection parish in Wola Duchacka district.

After completion of his school education, he joined a religious congregation of the Resurrectionists and after the novitiate made a profession on 15 September 1984. He consequently studied philosophy at the Vincentian Institute in Kraków and continued his studies of theology at the Pontifical Gregorian University in Rome, Italy, the master's degree at the Academy of Theology in Kraków and the licentiate of the Spirituality degree at the Salesian Pontifical University in Rome and was ordained a priest on 19 May 1990 by Bishop Stanisław Smoleński in Kraków, after completed his philosophical and theological studies.

Coat of arms of Bishop Wiesław Śpiewak

== Pastoral, administrative and educational work ==
After his ordination Fr. Śpiewak was engaged in the different services and from 1990 until 1992 was a Vice-Rector of the Minor Seminary of the Resurrectionists in Poznań, Poland; during 1992–1995 was a Vocational Pastoral Director and Secretary of the Provincial Superior in Warsaw and Kraków and during 1996–1997 was a Vocational Pastoral Director and Head of the Emmaus Vocation Center in Mszana Górna.

In 1997 he was transferred to Rome and here held a various positions at the Generalate. During 1998–2014 was a Postulator General of the Resurrections, while served a parish priest of Santa Maria Maddalena in Capranica Prenestina in the Roman Catholic Suburbicarian Diocese of Palestrina from 1998 until 2003, when he returned to Rome to serve at the Generalate. Later he returned to Poland and was elected a Provincial Superior of the Resurrectionists in Poland (2010–2015).

== Prelate ==
On 13 June 2015, Fr. Śpiewak was appointed by Pope Francis as a Diocesan Bishop of Roman Catholic Diocese of Hamilton in Bermuda. On 1 October 2015, he was consecrated as bishop by his predecessor, Bishop Emeritus Robert Kurtz and other prelates of the Roman Catholic Church in the Cathedral of Saint Theresa of Lisieux in Hamilton, Bermuda is the feast of St. Thérèse of Lisieux.

Catholic Church titles
Preceded by Robert Kurtz	Diocesan Bishop of Hamilton in Bermuda; 2015–present	Incumbent
