= Brian Hennessy (bishop) =

American-born Roman Catholic bishop (1919–1997)

The Most Reverend Brian Leo John Hennessy C.R.
- Bishop Emeritus of Hamilton in Bermuda
- Church: Catholic Church
- Diocese: Diocese of Hamilton in Bermuda
- Appointed: 28 February 1975
- Installed: 30 May 1975
- Term ended: 1 June 1995
- Predecessor: Bernard James Murphy
- Successor: Robert Joseph Kurtz

Orders
- Ordination: 30 July 1950 by Ralph Hubert Dignan
- Consecration: 14 May 1975 by Paul Francis Reding

Personal details
- Born: January 7, 1919 Detroit, Michigan, US
- Died: February 13, 1997 (aged 78)
- Buried: Holy Sepulchre Cemetery, Burlington, Ontario, Canada
- Education: St. Peter's Seminary
- Motto: Illum Crescere Me Minui ('He must increase, but I must decrease'; John 3:30)

Brian Leo John Hennessy, C.R. (7 January 1919 – 13 February 1997) was an American-born Catholic prelate who served as Bishop of Hamilton in Bermuda from 1975 to 1995. He was a member of the Resurrectionists.

== Biography ==
Hennessy, who was from Detroit, and raised in Hamilton, Ontario. He studied philosophy and theology at St. Peter's Seminary in London, Ontario and was ordained as a Catholic priest in North Bay, Ontario by Bishop Ralph Hubert Dignan on 30 July 1950. He served as headmaster at Scollard Hall in North Bay; principal of St. John's College in Brantford from 1965-1969; and as pastor of St. Joseph's Parish in Hamilton from 1969-1975.

He was ordained bishop on 14 May 1975 at the Cathedral of Christ the King in Hamilton by Bishop Paul Francis Reding. He was installed as the Bishop of the Roman Catholic Diocese of Hamilton in Bermuda 30 May 1975 and served the diocese to his retirement in 1995.

Catholic Church titles
Preceded by Bernard James Murphy	Roman Catholic Bishop of Bermuda; 1975–1995	Succeeded by Robert Joseph Kurtz
