= St. Agatha, Ontario =

St. Agatha
- Unincorporated community
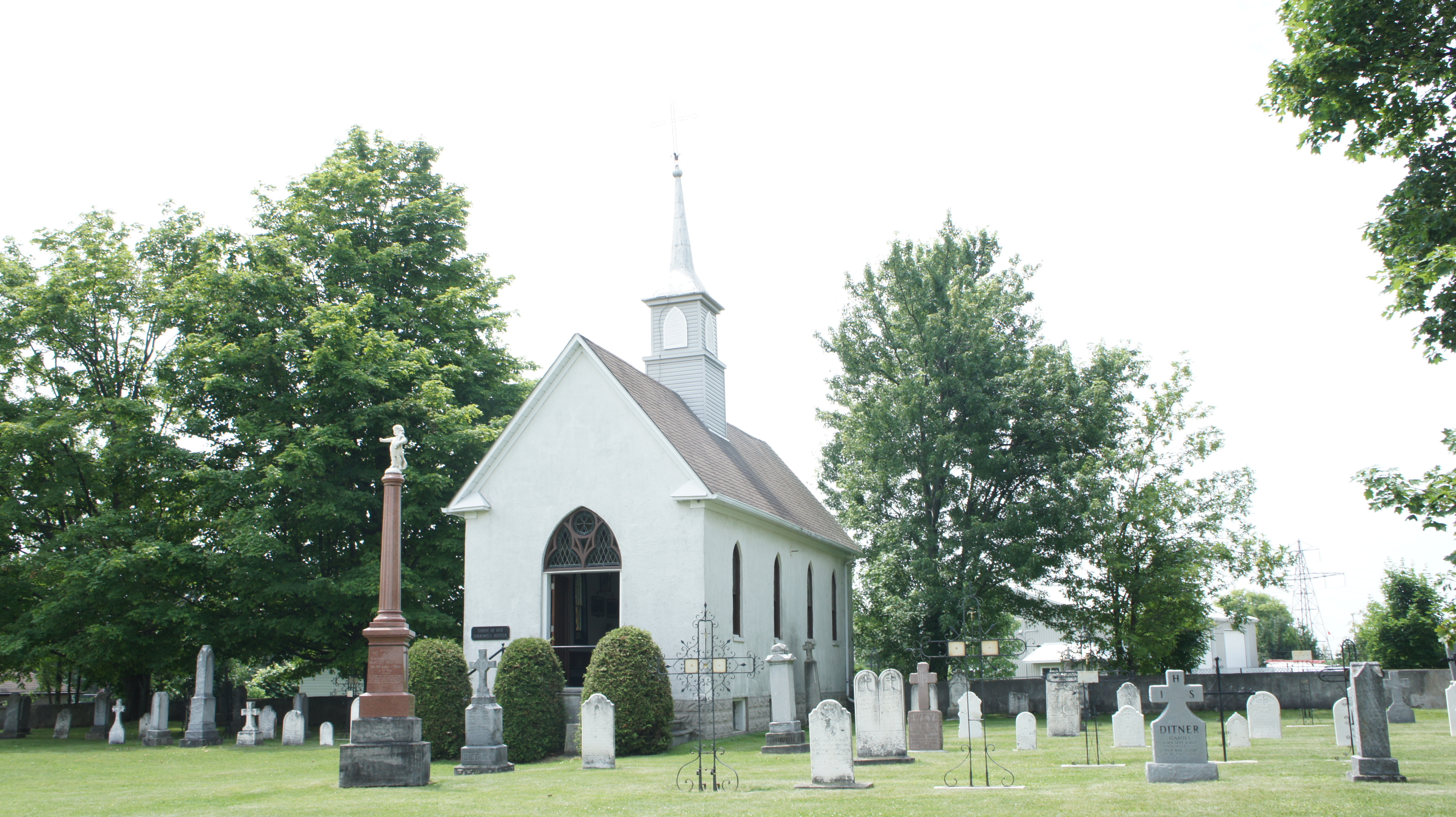
- The Shrine of Our Sorrowful Mother
- Interactive map of St. Agatha
- Coordinates: 43°26′8″N 80°37′51″W
- Country: Canada
- Province: Ontario
- Regional municipality: Waterloo
- Township: Wilmot

Area
  - Land: 0.67 km^{2} (0.26 sq mi)

Population (2021)
  - Total: 450
  - Density: 671.6/km^{2} (1,739/sq mi)
- Time zone: UTC-5 (EST)
  - Summer (DST): UTC-4 (EDT)
- Forward sortation area: N0B 2E0
- Area codes: 519 and 226
- NTS Map: 040P07
- GNBC Code: FEAPA

St. Agatha is an unincorporated community in Wilmot Township in the Regional Municipality of Waterloo, Ontario, Canada. It is recognized as a designated place by Statistics Canada.

== History ==
The village was settled by Amish Mennonites from Pennsylvania and Alsace-Lorraine in 1824. In the 1830's Lutherans and Roman Catholics began settling in the area, either buying land from the Amish Mennonites or from the Crown. These two religious groups would end up being the prominent religious groups in the village, with both groups establishing their own congregations in 1834.

The village was originally named Wilmot and was renamed in 1852 after the Catholic church in the village, St. Agatha.

In 1865, Father Eugene Funcken and his brother Father Louis Funcken established St. Jerome's College in the village. It would later move to Berlin, Ontario the next year.

== Demographics ==
In the 2021 Census of Population conducted by Statistics Canada, St. Agatha had a population of 450 living in 175 of its 177 total private dwellings, a change of 0% from its 2016 population of 450. With a land area of 0.67 km^{2} (0.26 sq mi), it had a population density of 671.6/km^{2} (1,739.5/sq mi) in 2021.

== Notable people ==
- Robert Dehler, Former Bishop of the Roman Catholic Diocese of Hamilton in Bermuda.
- Louis Dietrich, Mayor of Waterloo, Ontario from 1929 to 1930.

== See also ==
- List of communities in Ontario
- List of designated places in Ontario
