= Roman Catholic Diocese of Hamilton =

The Roman Catholic Diocese of Hamilton may refer to:

- The Roman Catholic Diocese of Hamilton, Ontario, Canada
- The Roman Catholic Diocese of Hamilton in Bermuda
- The Roman Catholic Diocese of Hamilton, New Zealand
