= Dehler =

Dehler is a surname. Notable people with the surname include:

- Robert Dehler (1889–1966), Canadian-born Roman Catholic bishop
- Steve Dehler (born 1950), American politician and businessman
- Steven Dehler (born 1987), American model, actor and dancer
- Thomas Dehler (1897–1967), German politician

See also

- Dehler Park, multi-use stadium in Billings, Montana
- Dehler Yachts, German brand of sailing yachts
