= Bishop of Hamilton =

The Bishop of Hamilton is the title for the holder of one of several Catholic episcopal sees:

- The Roman Catholic Diocese of Hamilton, Ontario
- The Roman Catholic Diocese of Hamilton in Bermuda
- The Roman Catholic Diocese of Hamilton, New Zealand
