= Bernard Murphy (bishop) =

Bernard James Murphy CR (27 December 1918 – 22 May 1974) was a Canadian-born Roman Catholic bishop.

Murphy was ordained as a Catholic priest in 1944 and served as the Bishop of the Roman Catholic Diocese of Hamilton in Bermuda from 1967 to his death of a myocardial infarction on 22 May 1974. He is buried in St. Clement Cemetery in Preston, Ontario.

Catholic Church titles
Preceded by Robert Dehler	Bishop of Hamilton in Bermuda; 1967–1974	Succeeded by Brian Hennessy
