= Louis Dietrich =

Canadian politician

Louis Frederick Dietrich

Mayor of Waterloo, Ontario
- In office 1929–1930
- Preceded by: William D. Brill
- Succeeded by: William Uffelman

Personal details
- Born: September 13, 1868; Wilmot, Ontario, Canada
- Died: June 11, 1947 (aged 78); Kitchener, Ontario, Canada
- Occupation: Politician, Businessman

Louis Frederick Dietrich (September 13, 1868 – June 11, 1947) was an automobile dealer and politician in Ontario, Canada. He served as mayor of Waterloo from 1929 to 1930.

== Life and career ==
Dietrich was born to German-Canadian parents Gregor Dietrich (1842—1906) and Emelia Doll (1843—1913) in St. Agatha. Around 1888, he apprenticed as a blacksmith in Baden and set up shop in his hometown in 1892. In 1893, he became a dealer for John Deere farm implements. In 1909, he moved to Waterloo and, two years later, he became a dealer for International Harvester. In 1915, he became a dealer for the Ford Motor Company. The following year, Dietrich became a Dodge franchisee.

He served on Waterloo council from 1922 to 1928. During his term as mayor, the Kitchener-Waterloo Municipal Airport was opened.

He died in 1947 in Kitchener, in Waterloo Region.
