= Hamilton, Bermuda =

Capital city of Bermuda

Hamilton
- City
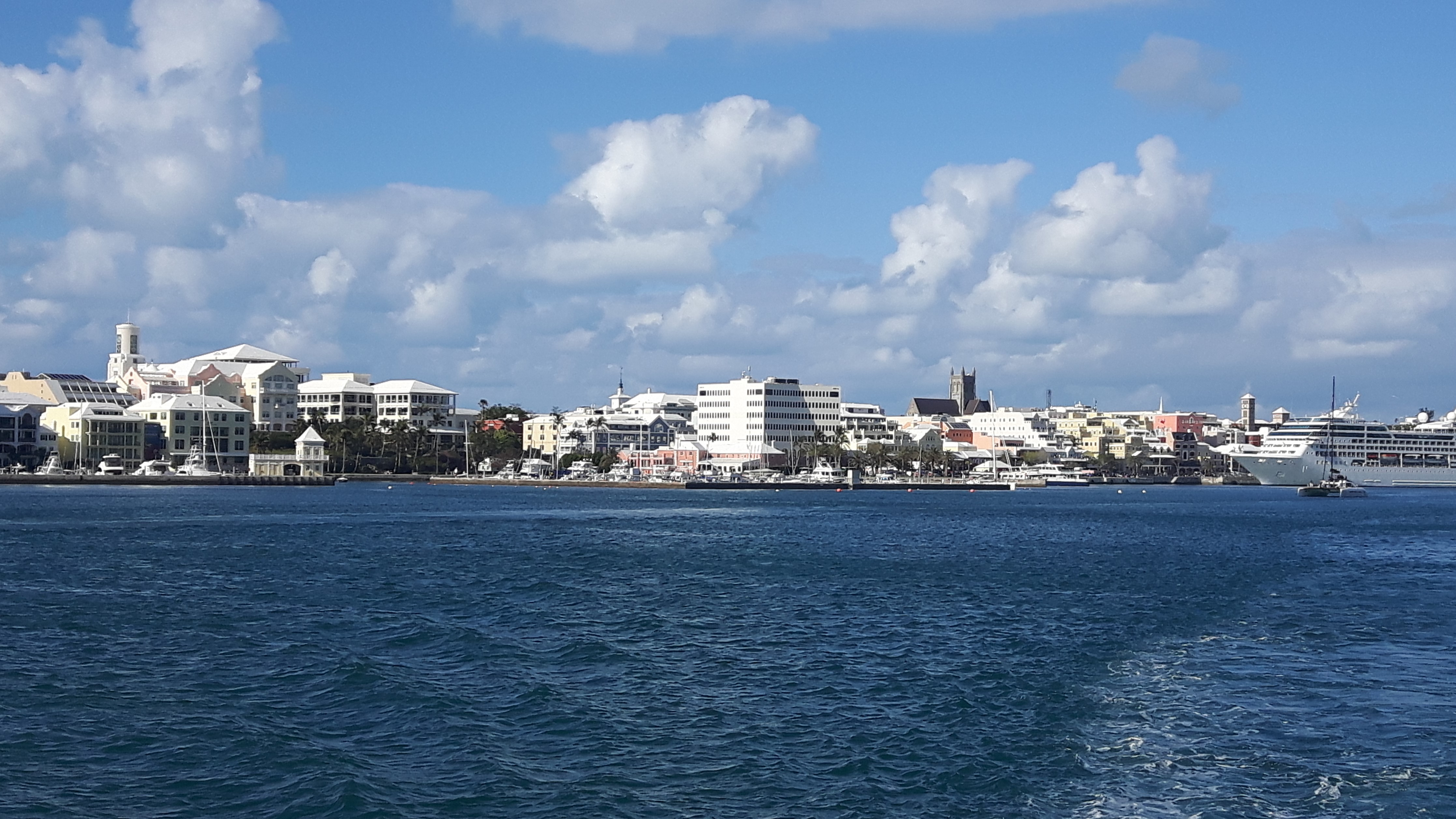
- Looking towards Hamilton

- Flag Coat of arms

- Location within Bermuda Location within North Atlantic
- Coordinates: 32°17′39″N 64°46′55″W
- Country: United Kingdom
- Territory: Bermuda
- Parish: Pembroke
- Founded: 1790
- Named for: Henry Hamilton

Government
  - Mayor: Charles Gosling

Area
  - Total: 0.28 sq mi (0.73 km^{2})
- Elevation: 62 ft (19 m)

Population (2016)
  - Total: 854
  - Density: 3,050/sq mi (1,180/km^{2})
- Time zone: UTC−04:00 (AST)
  - Summer (DST): UTC−03:00 (ADT)
- Climate: Af
- Website: cityofhamilton.bm

Hamilton is the capital city of the British Overseas Territory of Bermuda, and the main settlement of Pembroke Parish. A port city, Hamilton is Bermuda's financial and commercial centre, and a popular tourist destination. Its population of 854 (2016) and its small land area make it one of the smallest capital cities in the world.

== History ==
The history of Hamilton as a British city began in 1790 when the government of Bermuda set aside 145 acres (59 ha) for its future seat, officially incorporated in 1793 by an Act of Parliament, and named for Governor Henry Hamilton. The colony's capital relocated to Hamilton from St George's in 1815. The city has been at the political and military heart of Bermuda ever since. Government buildings include the parliament building, the Government House to the north, the former Admiralty House of the Royal Navy to the west (both in Pembroke), and the British Army garrison headquarters at Prospect Camp to its east. The Town of Hamilton became a city in 1897, ahead of the consecration in 1911 of the Cathedral of the Most Holy Trinity (Church of England), which was under construction at the time. A Catholic cathedral, St. Theresa's, was later constructed.

In 1940, the Royal Navy commissioned a former US Navy destroyer as HMS Hamilton. The 2 November 1940, issue of The Royal Gazette, a newspaper published in the City of Hamilton, reported this in an article titled "NEW" DESTROYER HAS NAME OF HAMILTON: Mayor Here Receives Letter From Her Commander, and began:

News has been received here of the destroyer Hamilton, one of the 50 destroyers recently acquired by Great Britain from the United States and named in honour of Bermuda's capital. Commander L. M. Shadwell, R.N., who commands the Hamilton, has written to the Mayor of Hamilton, Mr. S. P. Eve, a letter in which he says, "I thought it possible that you might be interested to have news from time to time of the ship which has the honour to bear the name of your city."

The article went on to mention that the Mayor was to open a fund to supply the crew of the ship with newspapers and included the text of Shadwell's letter.

In 17 February 1975, Queen Elizabeth II made a visit on city hall along with Prince Philip, in the course of world tour on the construction of the structure.

Today, the city overlooking Hamilton Harbour is primarily a business district, with few structures other than office buildings and shops. The City of Hamilton has long maintained a building height and view limit, which states that no buildings may obscure the cathedral. In the 21st century, buildings have been planned and some are under construction that are as high as ten storeys in the area. Bermuda's local newspaper, The Royal Gazette, reports, "If you don't recognise the city, from 15 years ago, we don't blame you as it has changed so much".

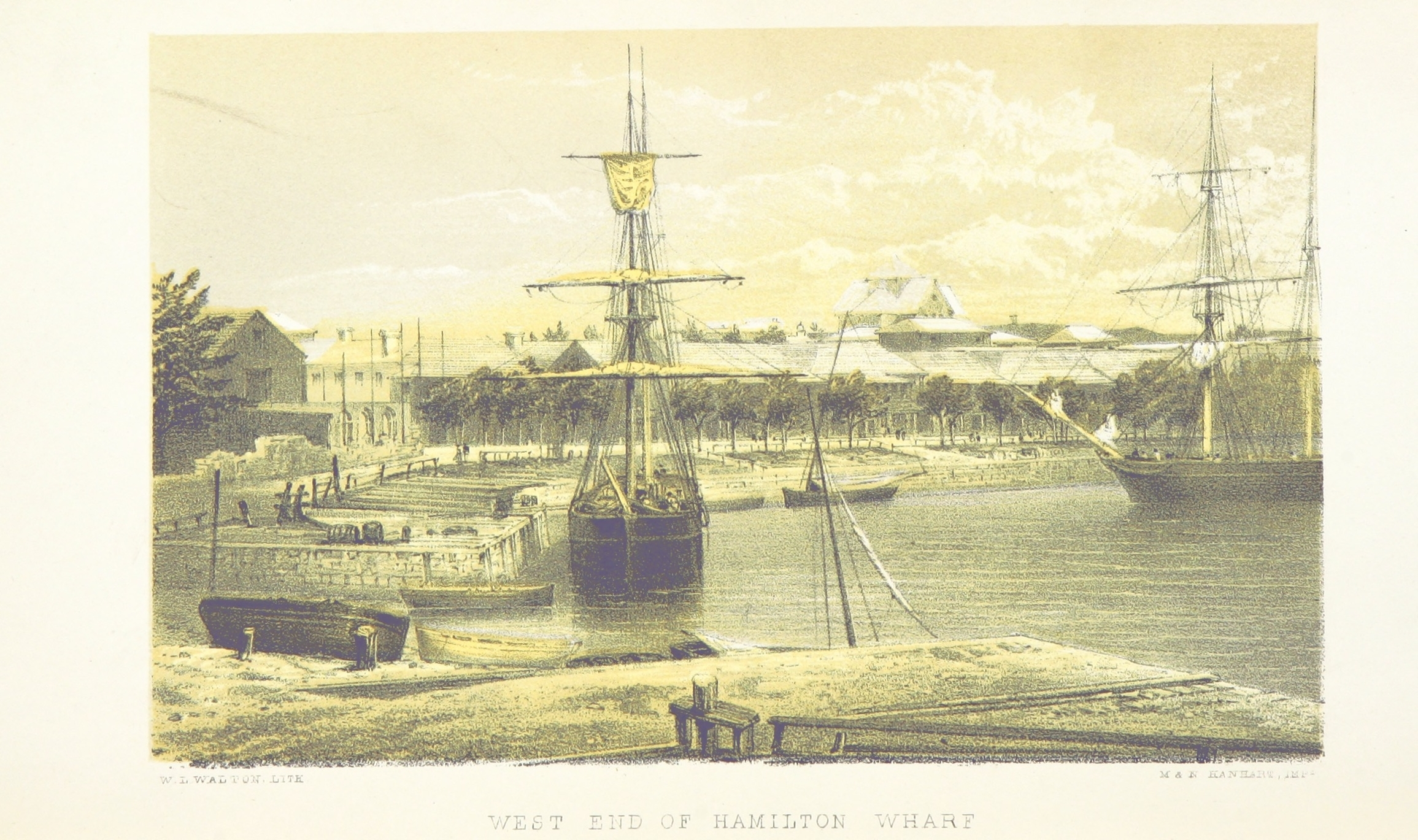
West end of Hamilton Wharf, 1857

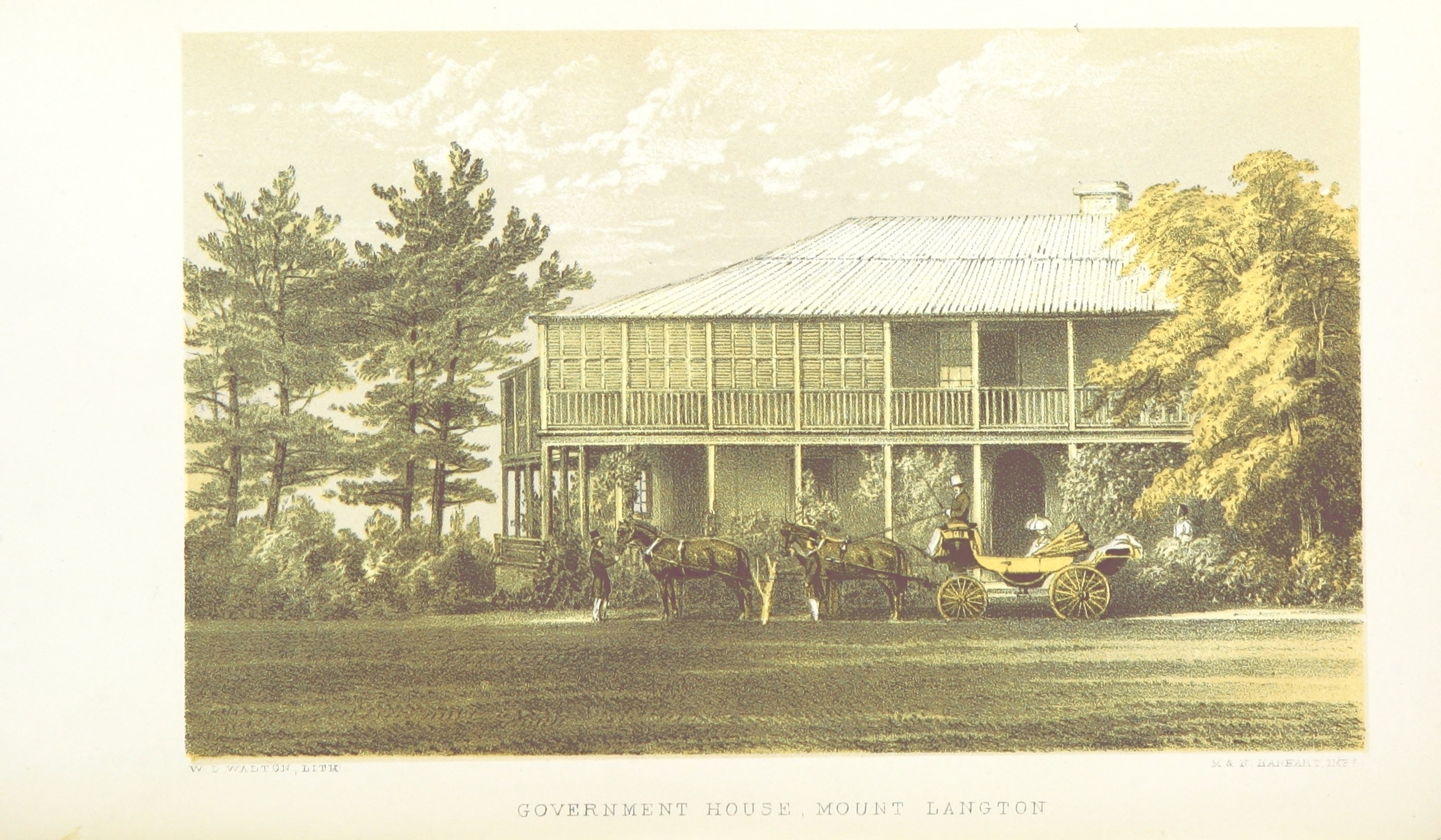
Old Government House, Mount Langton, 1857

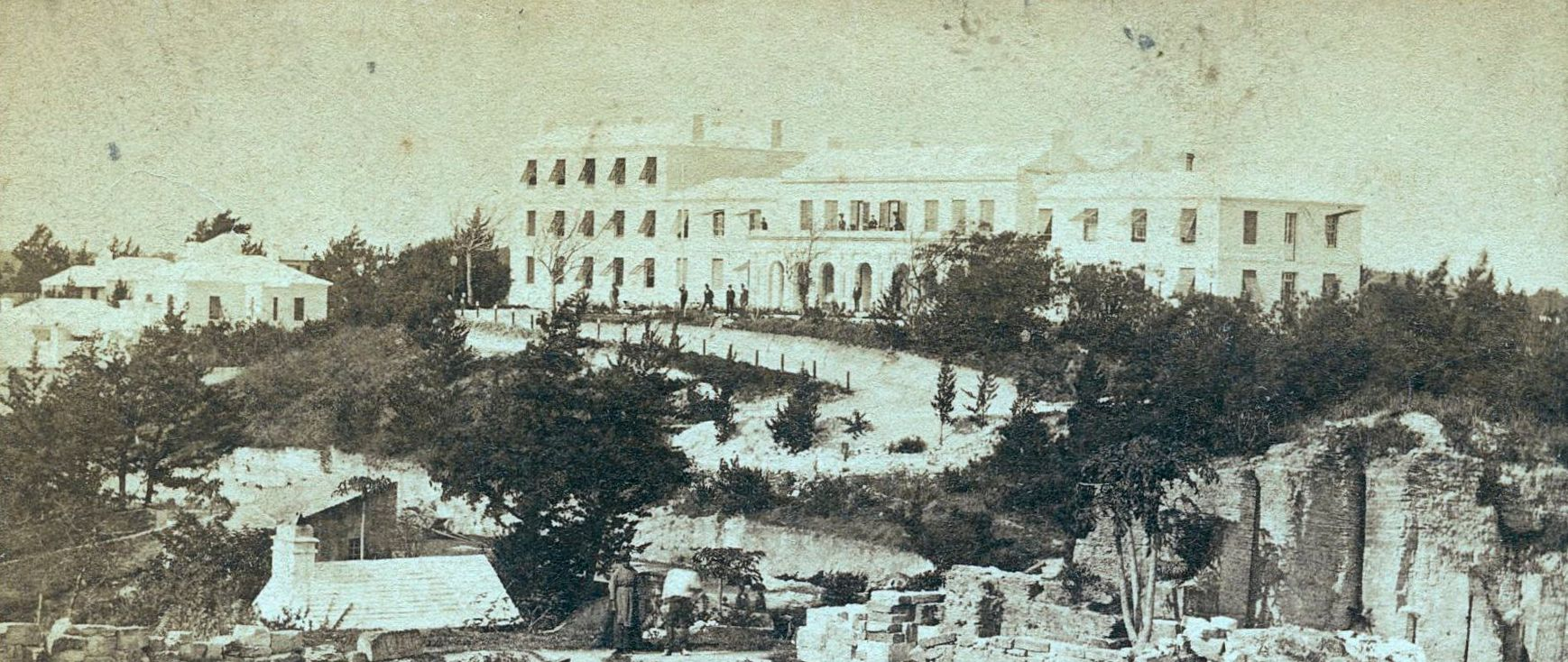
The Hamilton Hotel in 1875

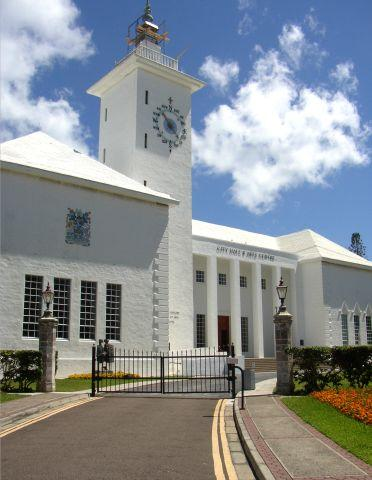
City Hall in Hamilton

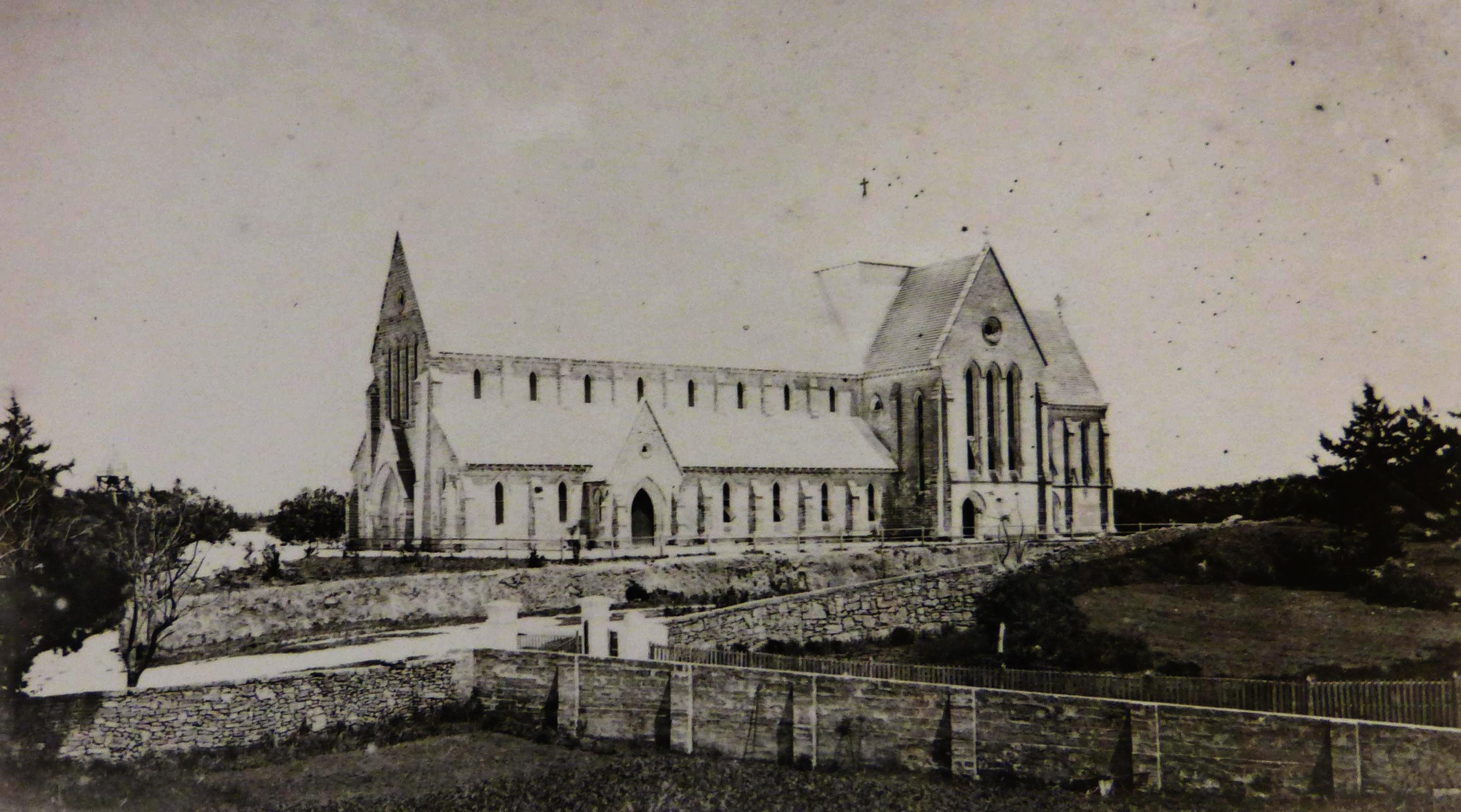
Trinity Church chapel-of-ease in 1879

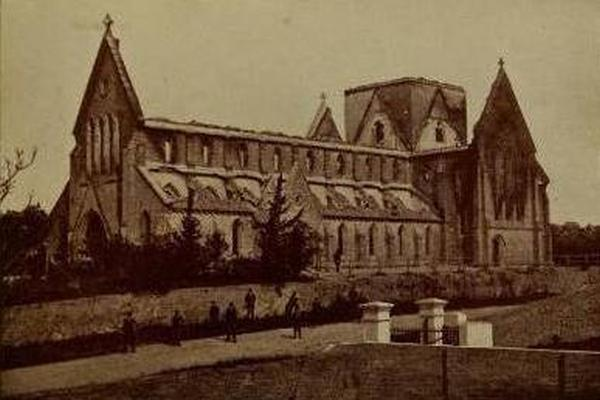
Trinity Church after the fire in 1884

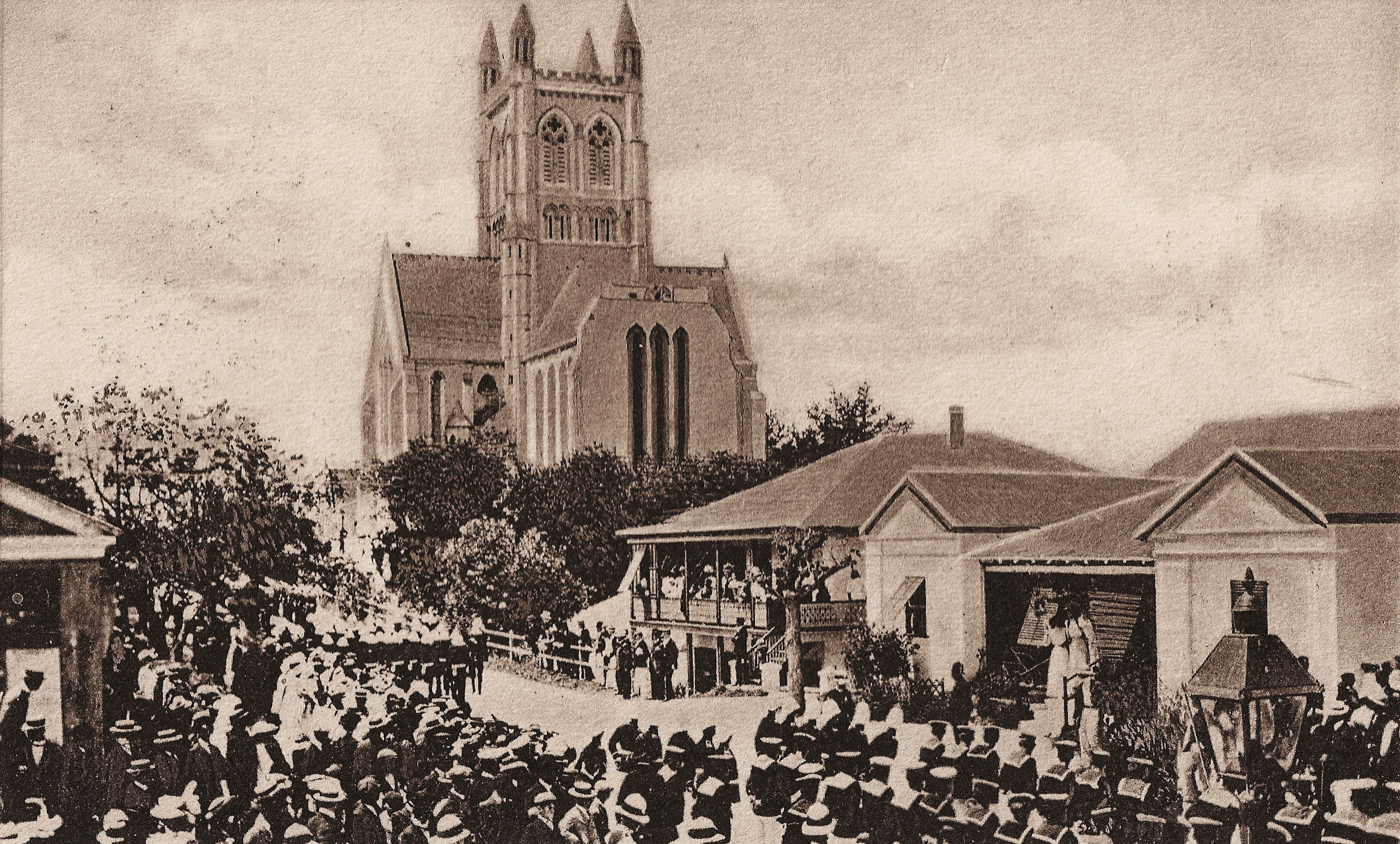
A Church Parade by the Royal Navy and British Army in front of the incomplete cathedral, circa 1900

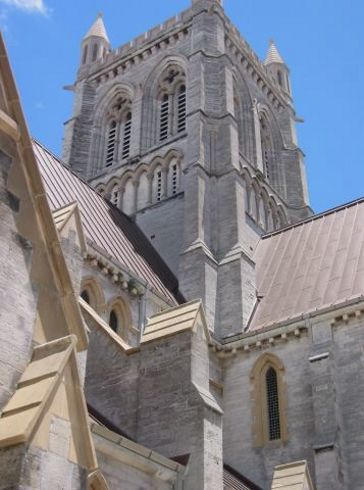
The Cathedral of the Most Holy Trinity, which replaced the original Trinity Church destroyed by fire

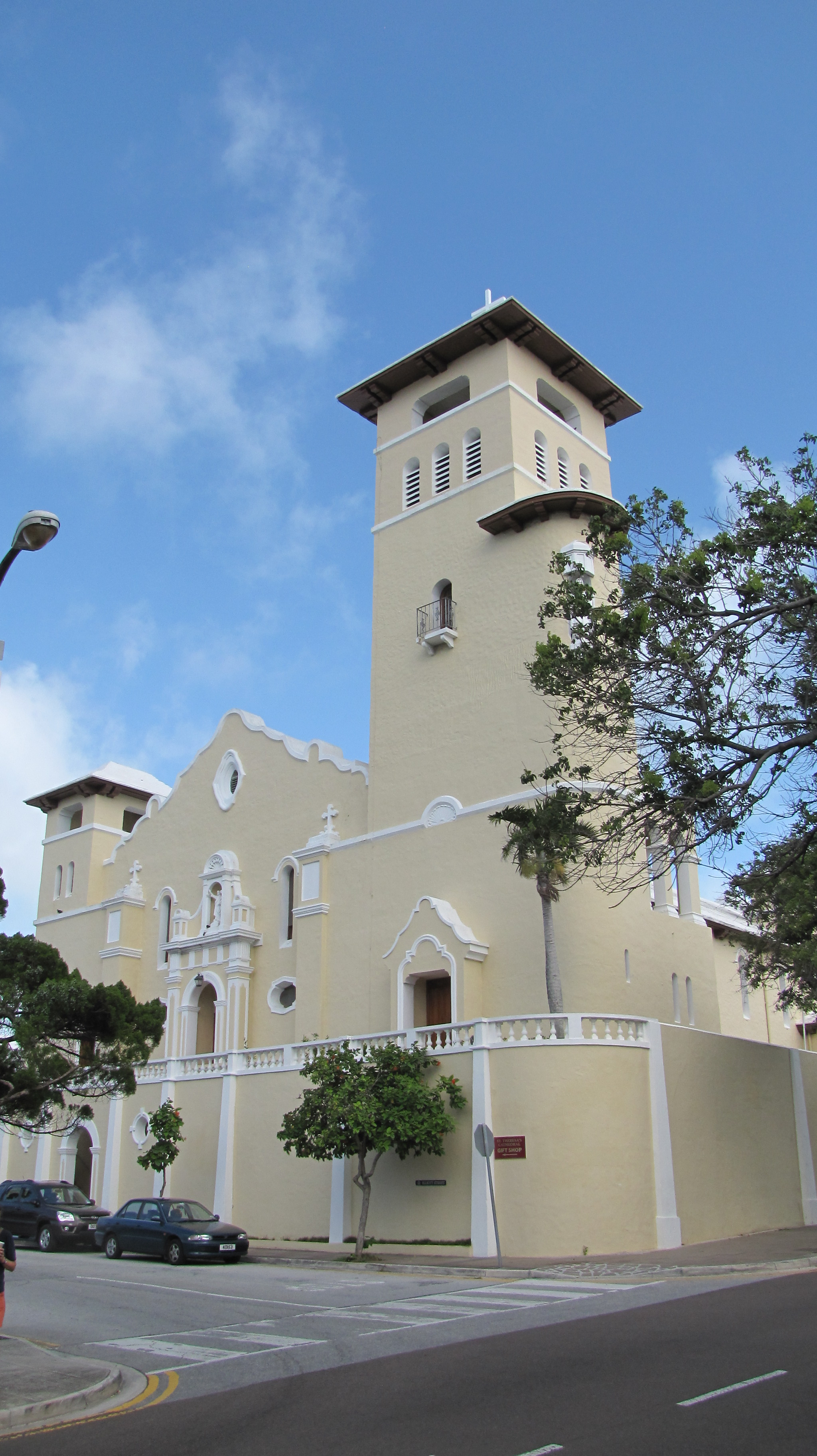
St. Theresa's (Roman Catholic) Cathedral.

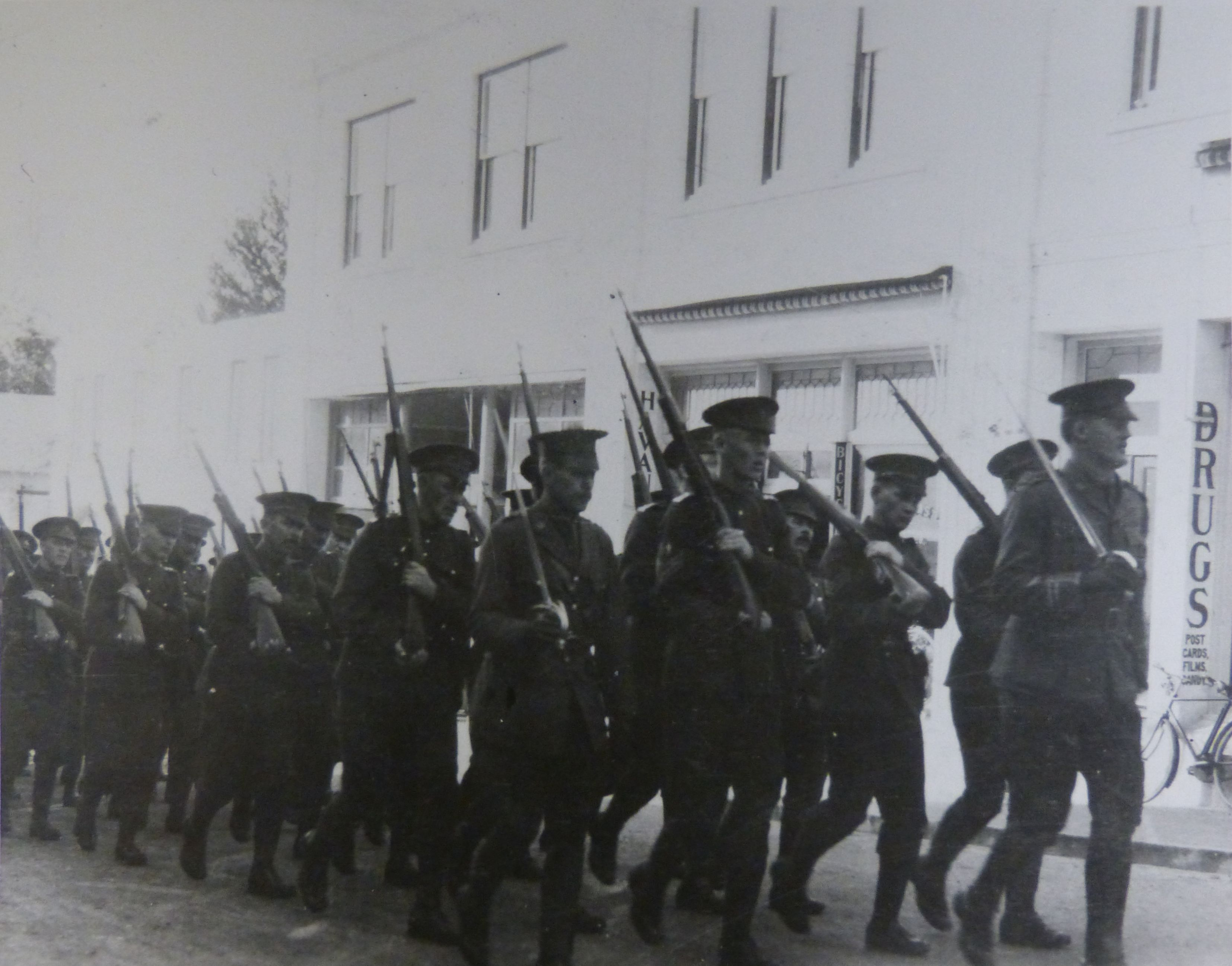
Soldiers of the 38th Battalion (Ottawa), Canadian Expeditionary Force marching on Queen Street in 1915.

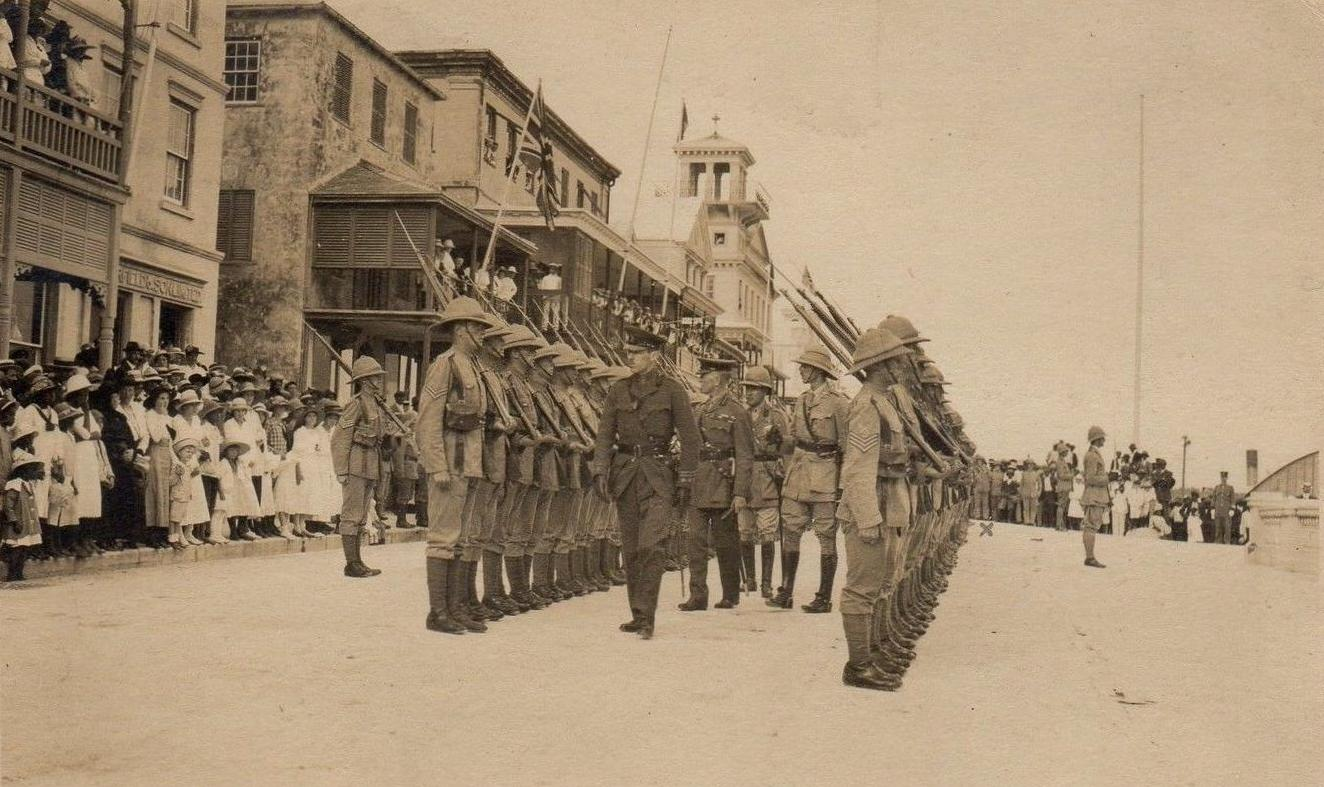
2/4th Battalion of the East Yorkshire Regiment guard on Front Street, inspected by General Sir James Willcocks on his arrival to replace Lieutenant-General Sir George Mackworth Bullock as Governor and Commander-in-Chief of Bermuda in 1917.

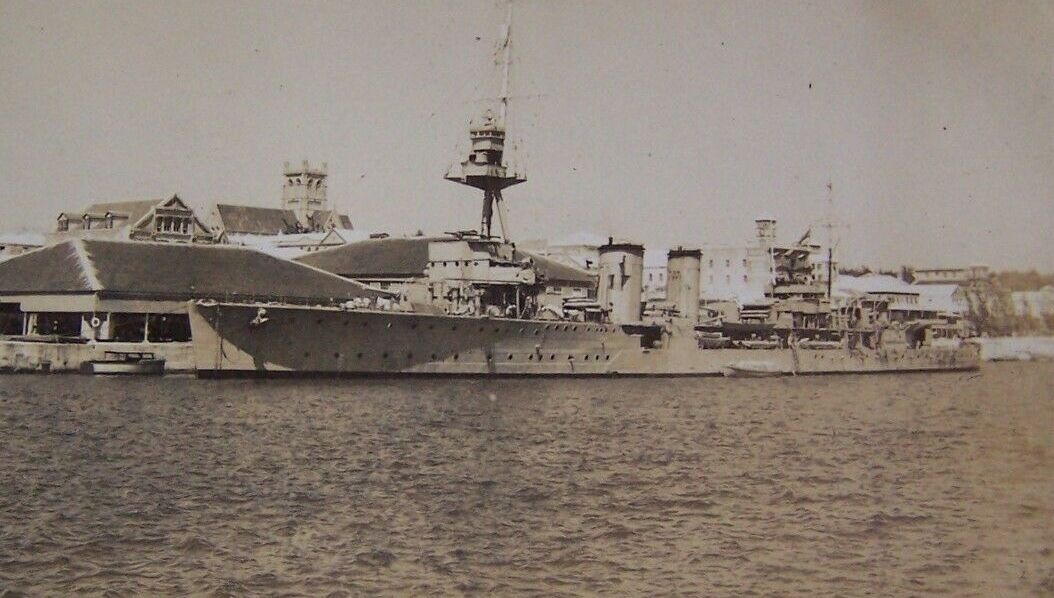
HMS Caradoc (D60) berthed on Front Street, circa 1928.

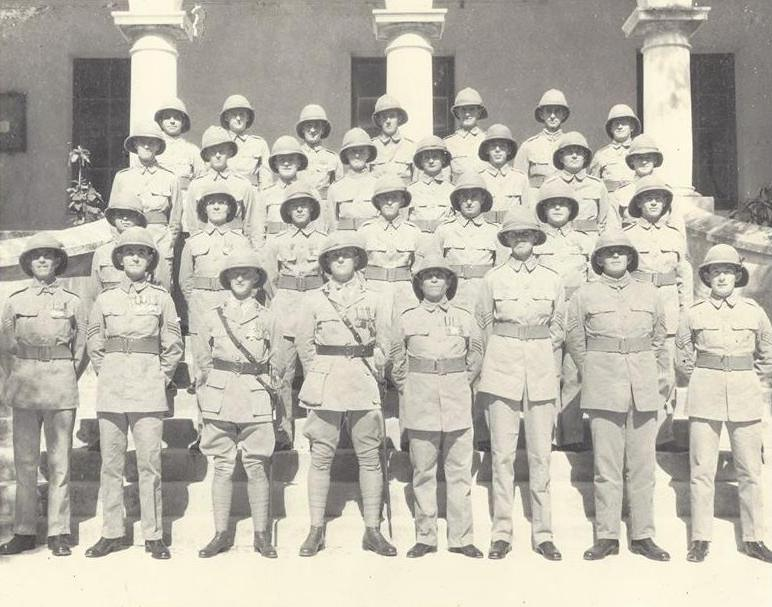
Bermuda Volunteer Engineers on the steps of the Masonic Hall on Reid Street in 1934.

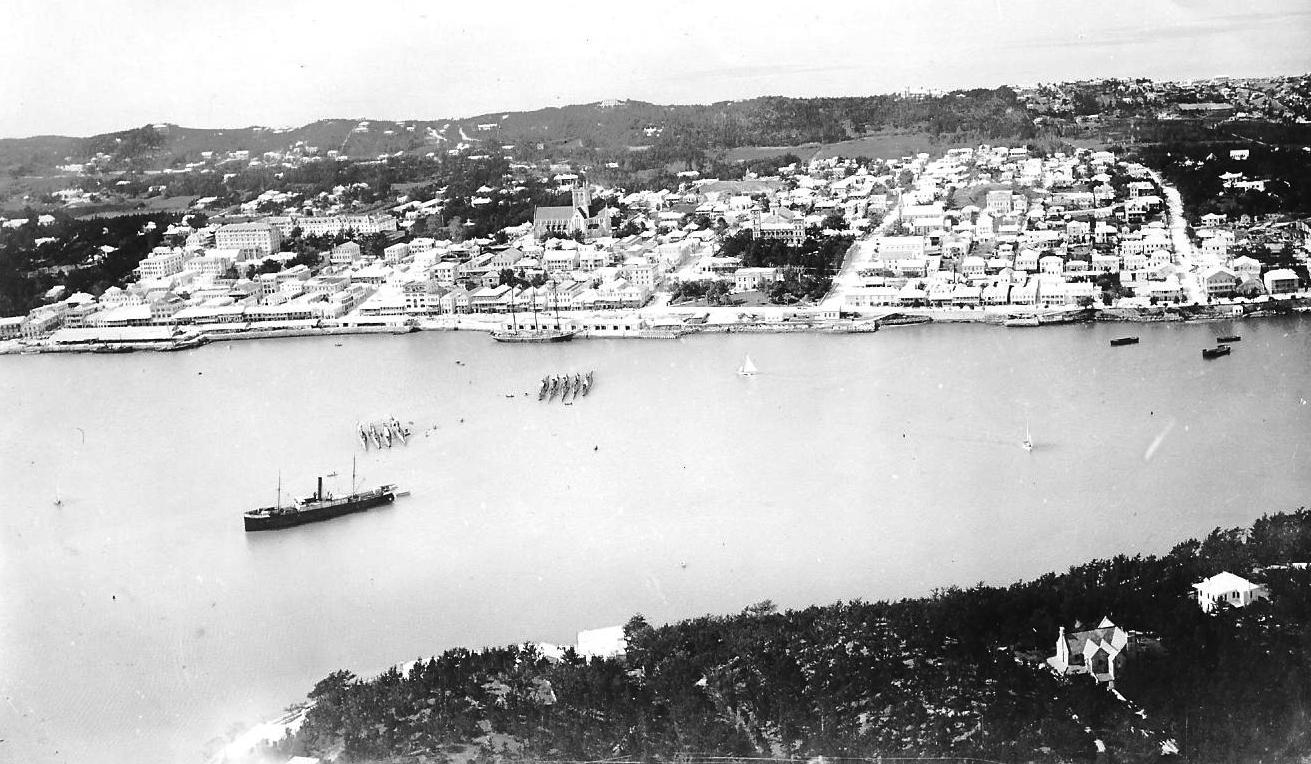
The City of Hamilton and Hamilton Harbour in the mid-1920s

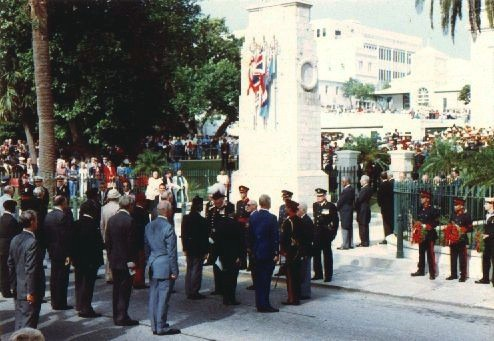
Remembrance Day Parade by the Governor of Bermuda, war veterans, Royal Navy, Royal Bermuda Regiment, Bermuda Police Service and other uniformed services at the Cenotaph on Front Street.

== Geography ==
Hamilton is located on the north side of Hamilton Harbour, and is Bermuda's main port. Although there is a parish of the same name, the city of Hamilton is in the parish of Pembroke. The city is named after Sir Henry Hamilton, governor of the territory from 1786 to 1793. Hamilton Parish antedates the city.

The administrative capital of Bermuda, Hamilton, has a limited permanent population around 854 (2016); however in 2010, 13,340 (40% of Bermuda's working population) worked here on a daily basis. The only incorporated city in Bermuda, Hamilton is smaller than the historic town of St. George's. A more representative measure of Bermuda's local residential populations tends to be by parish.

== Economy ==
As the offshore domicile of many foreign companies, Bermuda has a highly developed international business economy; it is an exporter of financial services, primarily insurance, reinsurance, investment funds, and special-purpose vehicles. Finance and international business constitute the largest sector of Bermuda's economy, and virtually all of this business takes place within the borders of Hamilton.

Numerous leading international insurance companies are based in Hamilton, as it is a global reinsurance centre. Around 400 internationally owned and operated businesses are physically based in Bermuda, and many are represented by the Association of Bermuda International Companies. In total, over 1,500 exempted or international companies are registered with the Registrar of Companies in Bermuda.

The city is the registered headquarters of the spirits manufacturer Bacardi, outsourcing company Genpact, and reinsurance company Tokio Millennium Re Ltd. Hamilton is known as the headquarters of international shipping companies, such as Frontline Ltd. Its low corporate tax rate makes it attractive to US companies.

In addition, the corporate headquarters of the Bermuda grocery store chain The MarketPlace is located within the chain's Hamilton MarketPlace location, the largest grocery store in Bermuda.

== Cost of living ==
According to Numbeo, Hamilton, Bermuda holds the record for the highest cost of living index in the world with the cost of living rate in Hamilton being at 138.01 as of 2023.

| Index | Rating |
|---|---|
| Cost of Living | 138.01 |
| Rent Index | 89.76 |
| Cost of Living Plus Rent | 114.91 |
| Groceries Index | 142.98 |
| Restaurant Price Index | 134.85 |
| Local Purchasing Power | 70.99 |

== Coat of arms and flag ==
Coat of arms of the city of Hamilton

Flag of the city of Hamilton

The coat of arms of the city of Hamilton incorporate a shield featuring a golden sailing ship, representing the Resolution, surrounded by three cinquefoils, two above the ship and one below, also in gold, all on a plain blue background. This shield is supported by a mermaid and heraldic sea horse (i.e., demi-horse, demi-fish), and is placed on a mount in front of which is a scroll containing the motto "Sparsa Collegit". The shield is topped by a crest featuring a closed helm topped with a torque above which an heraldic seahorse is emerging from the sea holding a flower. The city's full motto is Hamilton sparsa collegit, ("Hamilton has assembled the scattered").

The city's flag is a banner of arms, featuring the same details as on the shield of the city's coat of arms, but with the flowers in white rather than gold.

== Parks ==
The city of Hamilton has many parks for its size. One of the best known parks in the city is Victoria Park. This park occupies a whole block and was named after Queen Victoria. Other parks in the city are Par La Ville Park, Barr's Park, Albuoy's Point Park, and the hidden Cedar Park.

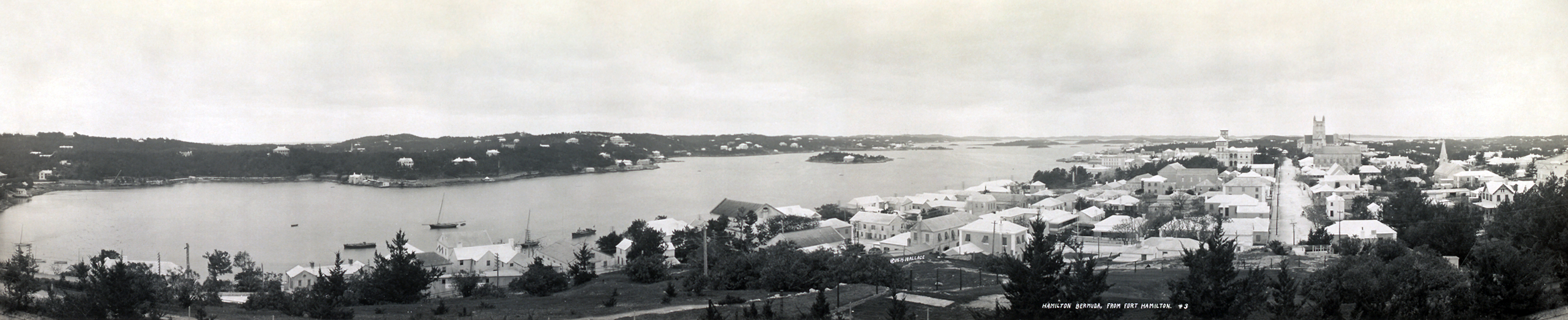
Panorama of Hamilton, 1911. View from Fort Hamilton.
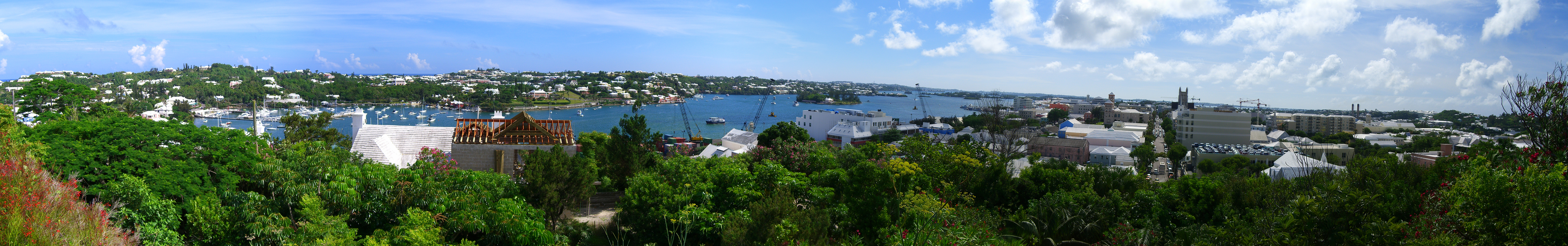
Panorama of Hamilton, 2007. Same vantage.

== Climate ==
Although located some distance north of the geographic tropics, Hamilton almost has a warm trade-wind tropical rainforest climate (Af). Due to colder winter temperatures, it features a humid subtropical climate. It is warm enough for coconut palms and other tropical palms to grow, although they may not fruit properly due to the lack of heat or sunshine during the winter months because of latitude. Hamilton has uncharacteristically warm temperatures for its latitude 32nd parallel north because of the moderating influence of the North Atlantic and nearby Gulf Stream. Hamilton features warm and humid summers and semi-warm "winters". As temperatures are moderated by the Atlantic Ocean, it rarely gets very hot or cold in the city. Precipitation is plentiful throughout the year and Hamilton does not have a dry season month, a month where on average less than 60 mm (2.36 in) of precipitation falls. Summer precipitation is usually from showers, thunderstorms, and tropical disturbances or even tropical cyclones. Meanwhile, winter precipitation is typically derived from eastward-moving extra-tropical cyclones and their associated fronts. Erratic, extended dry spells occasionally develop because of variations in the semi-permanent sub-tropical ridge locally known as the Bermuda-Azores High.

Climate data for Bermuda (L.F. Wade International Airport) (1991-2020 normals, extremes 1949-2023) (Note: Mean monthly maxima and minima (i.e. the highest and lowest temperature readings during an entire month or year) calculated based on data at said location from 2006 to 2023.)
| Month | Jan | Feb | Mar | Apr | May | Jun | Jul | Aug | Sep | Oct | Nov | Dec | Year |
|---|---|---|---|---|---|---|---|---|---|---|---|---|---|
| Record high °C (°F) | 25.4 (77.7) | 26.1 (79.0) | 26.1 (79.0) | 27.2 (81.0) | 30.0 (86.0) | 32.2 (90.0) | 33.1 (91.6) | 33.9 (93.0) | 33.2 (91.8) | 31.7 (89.0) | 28.9 (84.0) | 26.7 (80.0) | 33.9 (93.0) |
| Mean maximum °C (°F) | 23.4 (74.1) | 23.1 (73.6) | 23.5 (74.3) | 24.4 (75.9) | 26.5 (79.7) | 29.1 (84.4) | 30.7 (87.3) | 31.2 (88.2) | 30.6 (87.1) | 28.9 (84.0) | 26.3 (79.3) | 24.5 (76.1) | 31.3 (88.3) |
| Mean daily maximum °C (°F) | 20.7 (69.3) | 20.4 (68.7) | 20.5 (68.9) | 22.1 (71.8) | 24.3 (75.7) | 27.2 (81.0) | 29.6 (85.3) | 30.1 (86.2) | 29.1 (84.4) | 26.7 (80.1) | 23.8 (74.8) | 21.8 (71.2) | 24.7 (76.5) |
| Daily mean °C (°F) | 18.3 (64.9) | 17.9 (64.2) | 18.1 (64.6) | 19.7 (67.5) | 22.0 (71.6) | 25.0 (77.0) | 27.2 (81.0) | 27.7 (81.9) | 26.7 (80.1) | 24.4 (75.9) | 21.6 (70.9) | 19.6 (67.3) | 22.4 (72.3) |
| Mean daily minimum °C (°F) | 15.9 (60.6) | 15.4 (59.7) | 15.6 (60.1) | 17.3 (63.1) | 19.8 (67.6) | 22.7 (72.9) | 24.9 (76.8) | 25.2 (77.4) | 24.4 (75.9) | 22.2 (72.0) | 19.3 (66.7) | 17.3 (63.1) | 20.0 (68.0) |
| Mean minimum °C (°F) | 11.5 (52.7) | 11.6 (52.9) | 11.4 (52.5) | 14.0 (57.2) | 16.3 (61.3) | 19.4 (66.9) | 21.7 (71.1) | 22.5 (72.5) | 21.4 (70.5) | 19.0 (66.2) | 15.9 (60.6) | 13.6 (56.5) | 10.2 (50.4) |
| Record low °C (°F) | 7.2 (45.0) | 6.3 (43.3) | 7.2 (45.0) | 8.9 (48.0) | 12.1 (53.8) | 15.2 (59.4) | 16.1 (61.0) | 20.0 (68.0) | 18.9 (66.0) | 14.4 (58.0) | 12.4 (54.3) | 9.1 (48.4) | 6.3 (43.3) |
| Average precipitation mm (inches) | 127.6 (5.02) | 123.6 (4.87) | 118.9 (4.68) | 86.8 (3.42) | 94.6 (3.72) | 110.2 (4.34) | 116.2 (4.57) | 165.2 (6.50) | 145.2 (5.72) | 149.1 (5.87) | 111.6 (4.39) | 104.8 (4.13) | 1,453.8 (57.23) |
| Average precipitation days (≥ 1 mm) | 13.8 | 12.6 | 12.2 | 8.9 | 7.8 | 9.9 | 10.7 | 13.2 | 11.6 | 12.1 | 11.8 | 11.7 | 136.3 |
| Average relative humidity (%) | 73 | 73 | 73 | 74 | 79 | 81 | 80 | 79 | 77 | 74 | 72 | 72 | 76 |
| Average dew point °C (°F) | 13.4 (56.1) | 13.3 (55.9) | 12.9 (55.2) | 15.2 (59.4) | 17.7 (63.9) | 21.1 (70.0) | 22.8 (73.0) | 23.1 (73.6) | 22.2 (72.0) | 19.8 (67.6) | 16.6 (61.9) | 14.6 (58.3) | 17.7 (63.9) |
| Mean monthly sunshine hours | 143.2 | 147.6 | 189.7 | 231.9 | 255.9 | 255.6 | 284.6 | 272.7 | 221.8 | 198.3 | 168.0 | 146.6 | 2,515.9 |
Source: Bermuda Weather Service (mean max and min 2006-2023, humidity 1995-2010, dew point 2002-2018, sun 1999-2019)

== Education ==
School in Hamilton

- Francis Patton Primary School

== Sports ==
Hamilton has a host of beaches, which provide many opportunities for water sports, including surfing, wind surfing, water skiing, jet skiing, sailing and diving.

The highlight of the sports calendar is the Bermuda Gold Cup (or Argo Group Gold Cup as it is known), a sailing event which is a key stage of the World Match Racing Tour, one of only three sailing championships to be sanctioned by the International Sailing Federation (ISAF) with 'Special Event' status. The Argo Cup brings the world's best match-racing sailors (including world champions and Olympic sailors) to Bermuda for five days of one-on-one 'match racing'. Points accrued during the event contribute to the World Match Racing Tour and ultimately a chance to race in the final event, the Monsoon Cup in Malaysia. The winner of that is crowned ISAF World Match Racing Champion. Unlike many water-based sports, which occur too far out to view from shore, 'match racing' is a great spectator sport. The race takes place only 15m from the shore, and spectators can see the heart of the action.

The history of the modern Bermuda Gold Cup event dates back to the very beginning of the match racing style of sailing. The first 'match race' in a one-design racing yacht, i.e. technically identical boats, was the King Edward VII Gold Cup in Bermuda (now known as the Argo Gold Cup) that was first sailed in 1937. The Argo Gold Cup is still a key event in the World Match Racing Tour calendar.

The King Edward VII Cup itself was originally given at the Tri-Centenary Regatta at Jamestown, Virginia, in 1907, by King Edward VII in commemoration of the 300th Anniversary of the first permanent settlement in America. C. Sherman Hoyt won that regatta, and was the first sailor to accept the historic trophy.

Hoyt held the Gold Cup for three decades before donating it to the Royal Bermuda Yacht Club and proposing an annual one-on-one match-race series in 6-Meter yachts. In his letter he expressed the propriety of "my returning a British Royal trophy to the custody of your club, with its long record of clean sportsmanship and keenly contested races between your Bermuda yachts and ours of Long Island Sound, and elsewhere..." The first winner of the Cup in its new format was Briggs Cunningham in 1937. He was also the first skipper to win the America's Cup in a 12-Meter racing yacht.

== Transport ==
=== Air ===
Air travel is served by L.F. Wade International Airport which is located 11 km northeast of Hamilton.

=== Busses ===
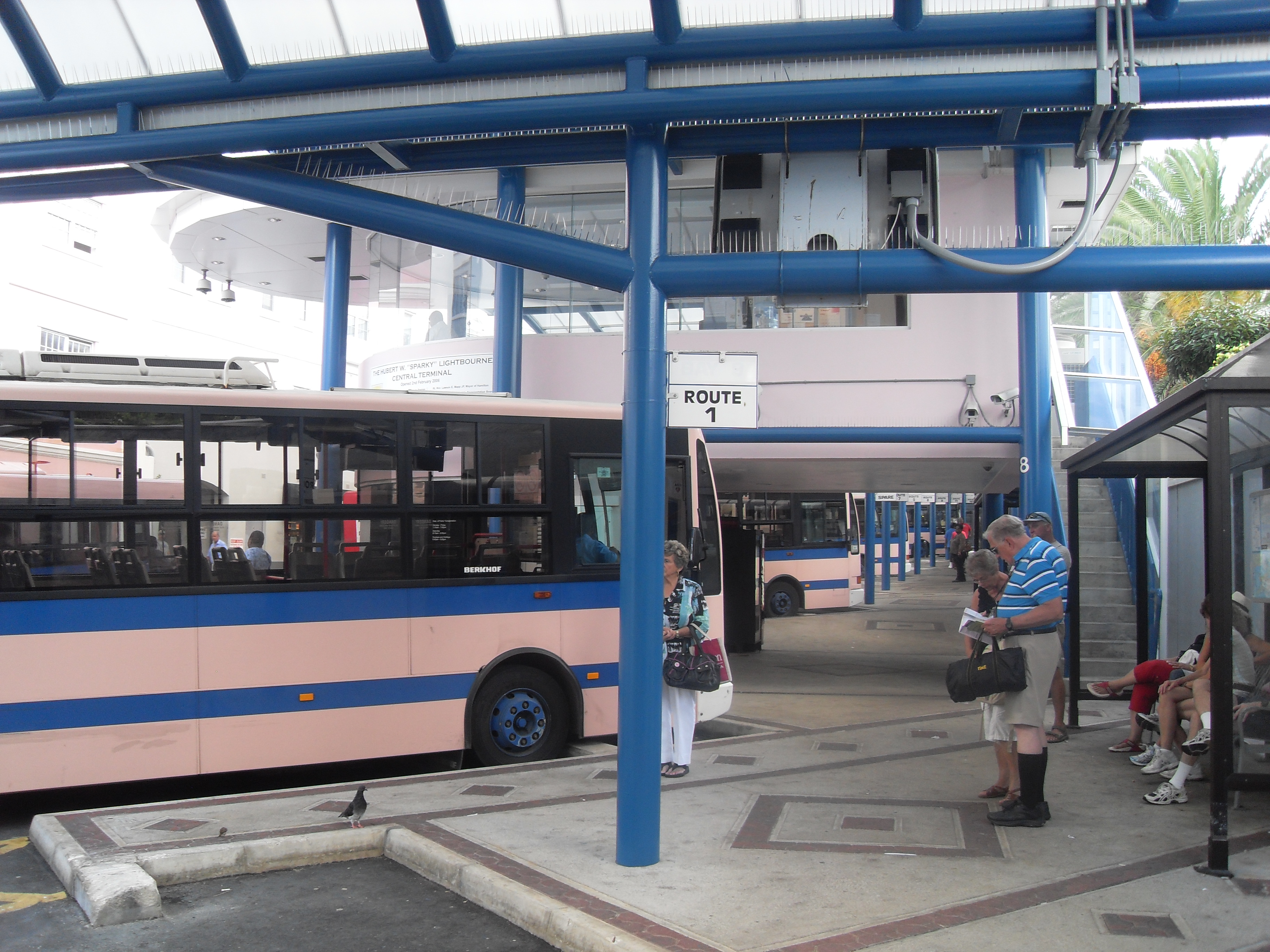
Bus Terminal, Hamilton, Bermuda

All but one route (Route 6) in Bermuda start from the bus terminal in Hamilton.

- Route 1 – Hamilton / Grotto Bay / St. George's
- Route 2 – Hamilton / Ord Road
- Route 3 – Hamilton / Grotto Bay / St. George's
- Route 4 – Hamilton / Spanish Point
- Route 5 – Hamilton / Pond Hill
- Route 7 – Hamilton / Barnes Corner via South Shore Road
- Route 8 & 8C – Hamilton / Barnes Corner; Hamilton / Dockyard; Hamilton / Somerset via Middle Road
- Route 9 – Hamilton / Prospect (National Stadium)
- Route 10 – Hamilton / St. George's via North Shore past Aquarium
- Route 11 – Hamilton / St. George's via North Shore Road

== Notable people ==
- Jacques Loeb (1859–1924), physiologist, died in Hamilton
- Squadron Leader Arthur Rowe Spurling (1896 in Hamilton – 1984 in Guernsey) was a Bermudian who served during the First World War as an infantryman and an aviator, becoming an ace. He was a ferry pilot during the Second World War.
- Rev. Canon Guy Pentreath MA Cantab. (1902 in Hamilton −1985 in Ashford, Kent) was an Anglican clergyman and headmaster. In his retirement, he was a chaplain and guest lecturer on many Swan Hellenic cruises.
- Sir Gilbert Alexander "Gibby" Cooper, CBE, ED (1903 – 29 May 1989) was a businessman and politician in Bermuda, serving as a member of the House of Assembly and as Mayor of Hamilton.
- Edwin Bennett Astwood (1909–1976) physiologist and endocrinologist whose work led to treatments for hyperthyroidism
- Russell Dismont (1913–2005) educator, tennis player and campaigner against racial discrimination.
- Graham Gibbons CBE (1920–2016) was a Bermudian businessman and politician who served as the mayor of Hamilton from 1972 to 1988.
- Fernance B. Perry MBE (1922 in Ponta Delgada, Azores – 2014 in Atlanta, Georgia) was a Portuguese-Bermudian entrepreneur who had a prominent role in the economy of Bermuda.
- Johnny Barnes (born 1923 in Hamilton – 2016) was a Bermudian native who waved to passing traffic at the foot of the Lane roundabout in Hamilton from roughly 3:45 am to 10 am, every workday, rain or shine.
- Earle E. Seaton (1924 – 1993 in USA) was a jurist and a diplomat.
- Arthur Motyer (1925 in Hamilton – 2011 in Canada) was a Canadian educator, playwright, and novelist.
- Dame Lois Browne-Evans DBE JP (1927 in Pembroke – 2007) was a lawyer and political figure in Bermuda. She was Bermuda's first female Attorney-General
- Nora Sayre (1932 in Hamilton – 2001 in the USA) was an American film critic and essayist.
- Robert Kurtz, CR (born 1939 in Chicago, Illinois) is an American-born Roman Catholic bishop, who has served as the Bishop of the Roman Catholic Diocese of Hamilton in Bermuda since 1995.
- Mel Ming (born Hamilton 1944) was a Bermudian-American broadcast executive.
- Gabriel Jackson (born 1962 in Hamilton) is an English composer.
- Lena Headey (born 1973 in Hamilton) is an English actress, voice actress and film producer.
- Jordan Claire Robbins (born 1990 in Hamilton) is a Bermudian-Canadian actress
- Gina Swainson (born 1958 in Hamilton) was the winner of Miss World 1979 and first runner-up at Miss Universe 1979.
- Diana Douglas (born 1923 in Devonshire), wife of Kirk Douglas, mother to Michael Douglas

=== Sport ===
- William Eldon Tucker (1872 in Hamilton – 1953 in Paget) was a Bermudian rugby union player who played club rugby in England. He was selected for England in 1894. He returned to Bermuda after qualifying as a medical doctor.
- Bill Tucker CVO MBE TD (1903 in Hamilton – 1991) was a Bermudian rugby union player who played club rugby in England. He was selected for England in 1926. Tucker was a notable orthopaedic surgeon, specialising in sports injuries.
- Jordy Walker (1939 in Hamilton – 2010 in Hamilton) a sailor from Bermuda. He competed at the 1972 Summer Olympics.
- Gary Darrell (born 1947 in Hamilton) is a Bermudian retired association football player and manager who played in the North American Soccer League.
- Kyle Lightbourne (born 1968 in Hamilton) is a former Bermudian footballer who mainly played for Walsall F.C., Stoke City F.C. and Macclesfield Town F.C.
- Dean Minors (born 1970 in Hamilton) is a Bermudian cricketer, who played as wicketkeeper.
- David Hemp (born 1970 in Hamilton) is a Bermudian cricketer – a left-handed batsman and a right-arm medium-pace bowler.
- Leonard Shaun Goater MBE (born 1970 in Hamilton) is a Bermudian former footballer. He played as a striker for a number of English clubs and is manager of Ilkeston F.C.
- Dwayne Leverock (born 1971 in Hamilton) is a former Bermudian cricketer. He is a policeman and also drives a prison van and played football with Bermudian team Zebras. He also plays golf.
- Tim Hemp (born 1974 in Hamilton) is a former cricketer – a right-handed batsman and a right-arm medium-pace bowler.
- Chris Foggo (born 1982 in Hamilton) is a Bermudian cricketer – a right-handed batsman.
- Caroline Nichols (born 1984 in Hamilton) is an American field hockey player. She was a member of the 2008 U.S. Olympic Team for Women's Field Hockey and the 2012 US Olympic team.
- Taurean Manders (born 1986 in Hamilton) is a footballer who plays for English club Whitchurch United F.C.
- Nahki Wells (born 1990 in Hamilton) is a footballer who plays as a forward for Championship club Bristol City F.C. and the Bermuda national team.
- Kilian Elkinson (born 1990 in Hamilton) is a Bermudian soccer player, who moved to Canada, aged 15.
- Reggie Lambe (born 1991 in Hamilton) is a footballer who plays for English club Cambridge United F.C as a midfielder
- Mauriq Hill (1995 in Hamilton) is a Bermudian footballer who plays for the SIMA Águilas.
- Djair Parfitt-Williams (born 1996 in Hamilton) is a professional footballer who plays for West Ham United F.C. as a forward

== Gallery ==
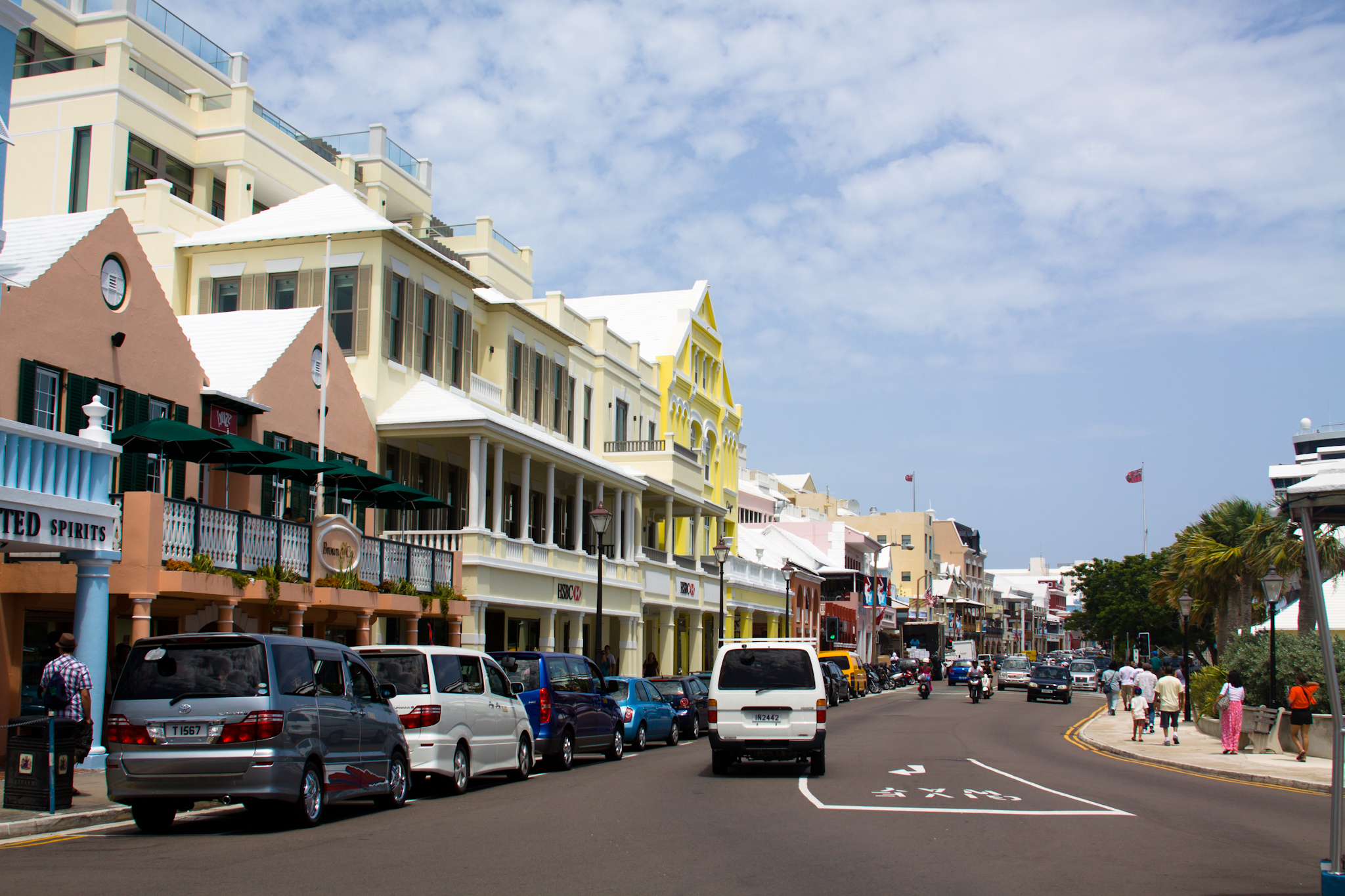
Front Street

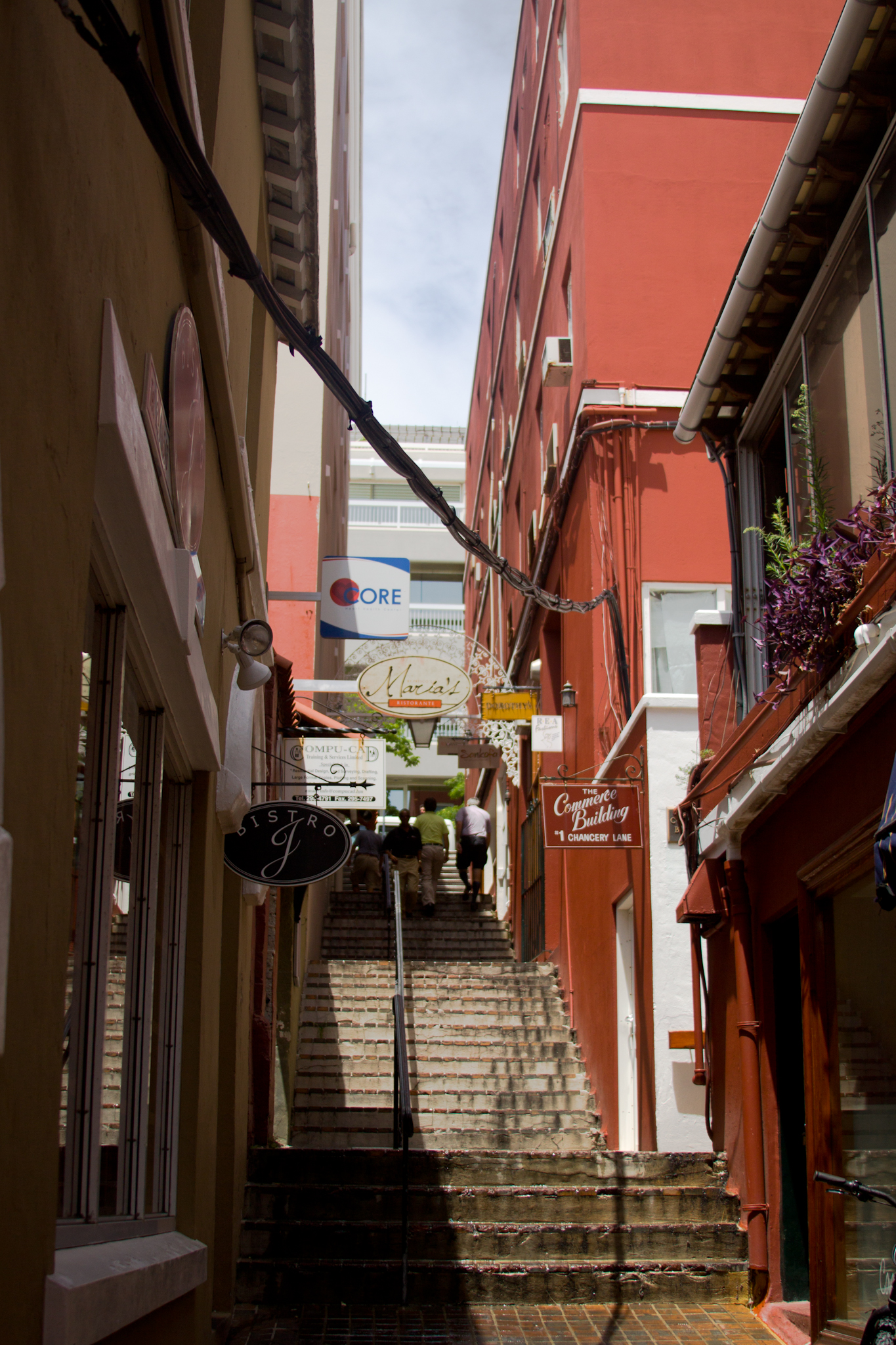
Chancery Lane

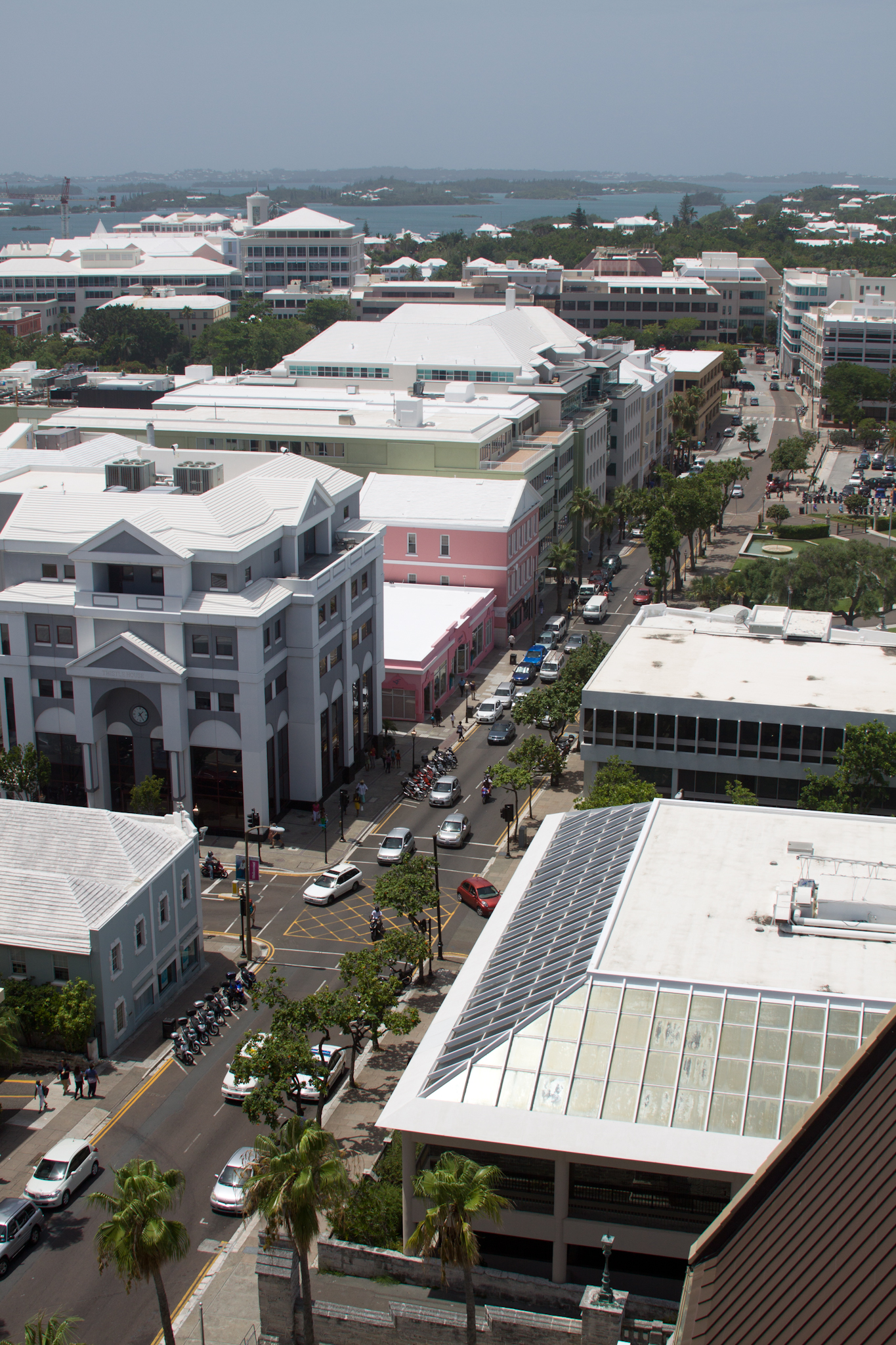
View from the cathedral's tower

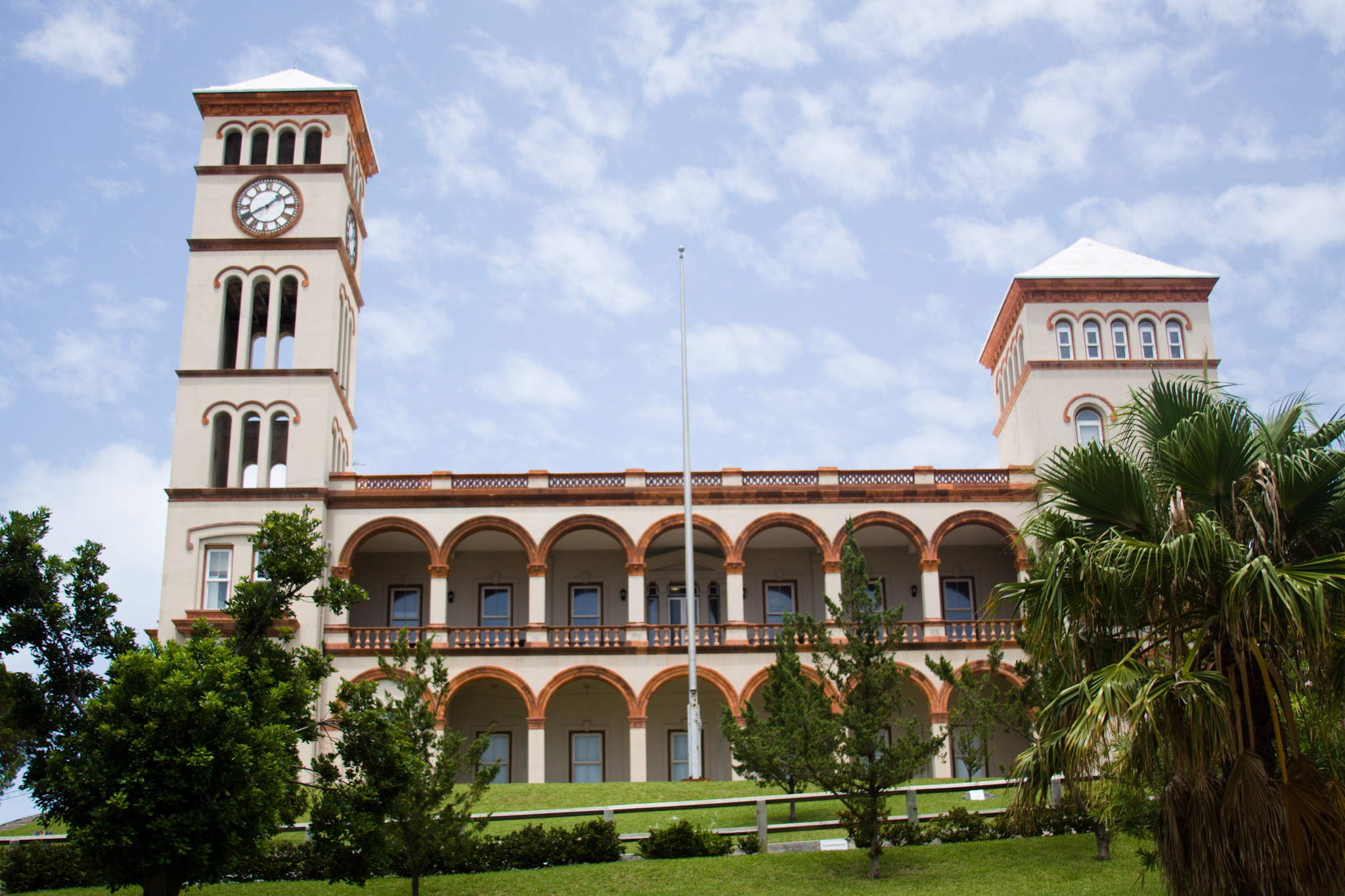
Sessions House, home of Bermuda's House of Assembly and Supreme Court

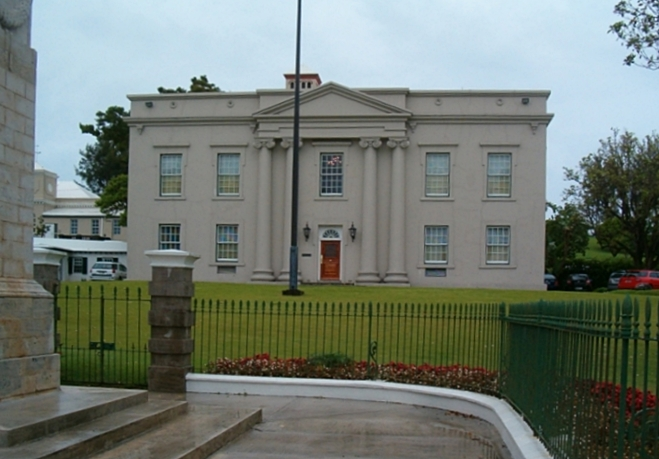
Cabinet Building, home to Bermuda's Senate

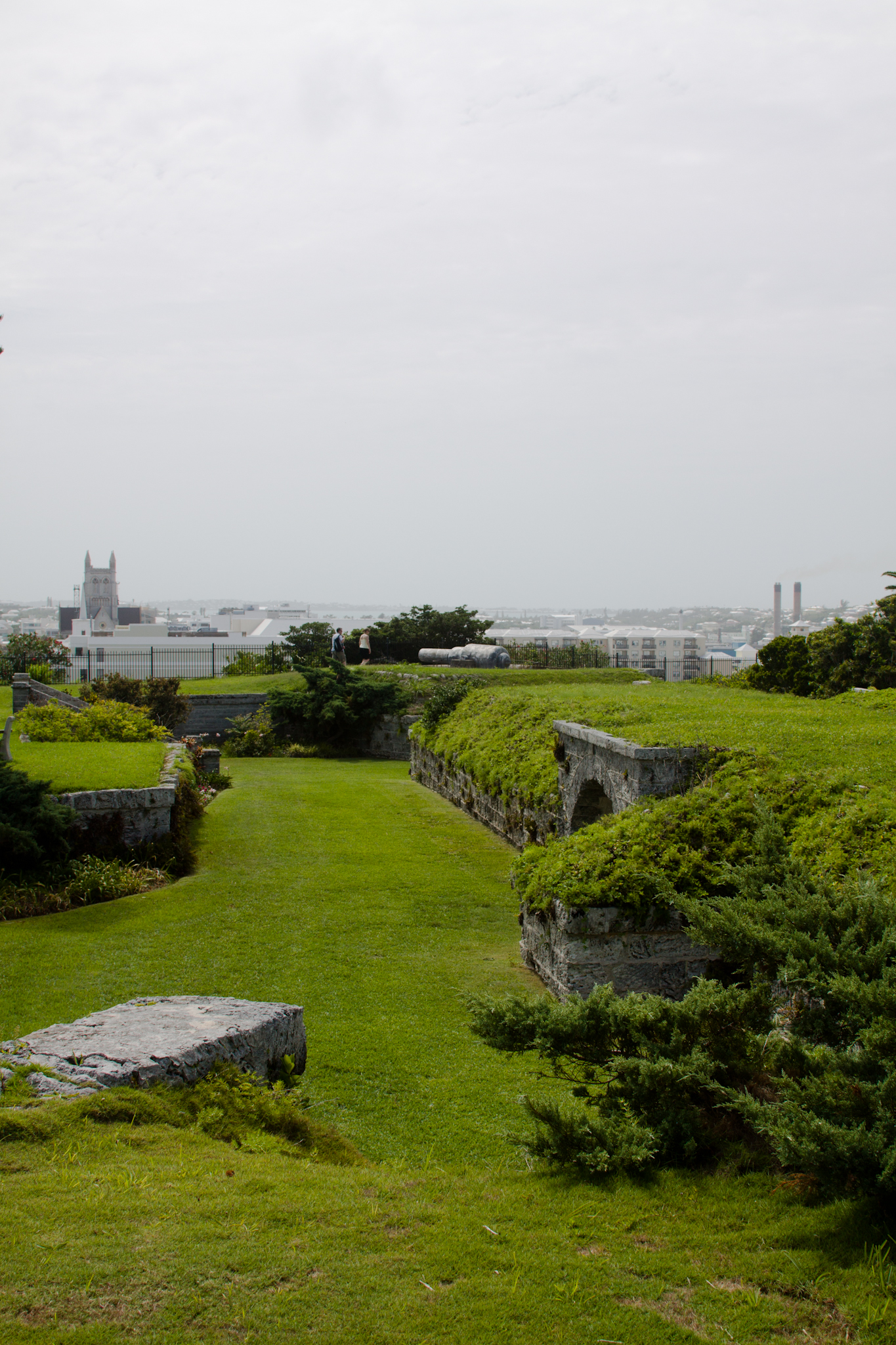
Fort Hamilton

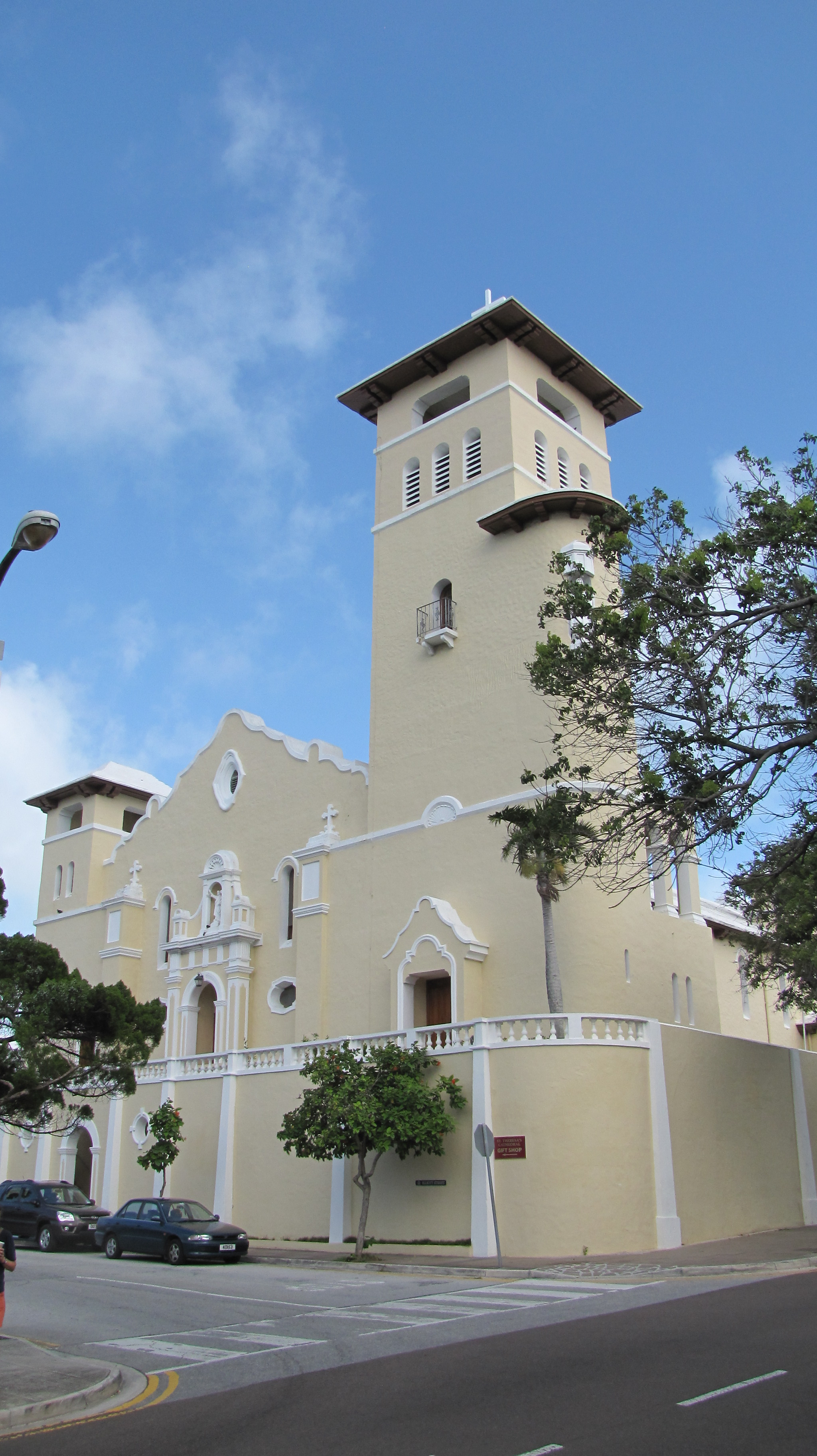
Saint Theresa's Cathedral

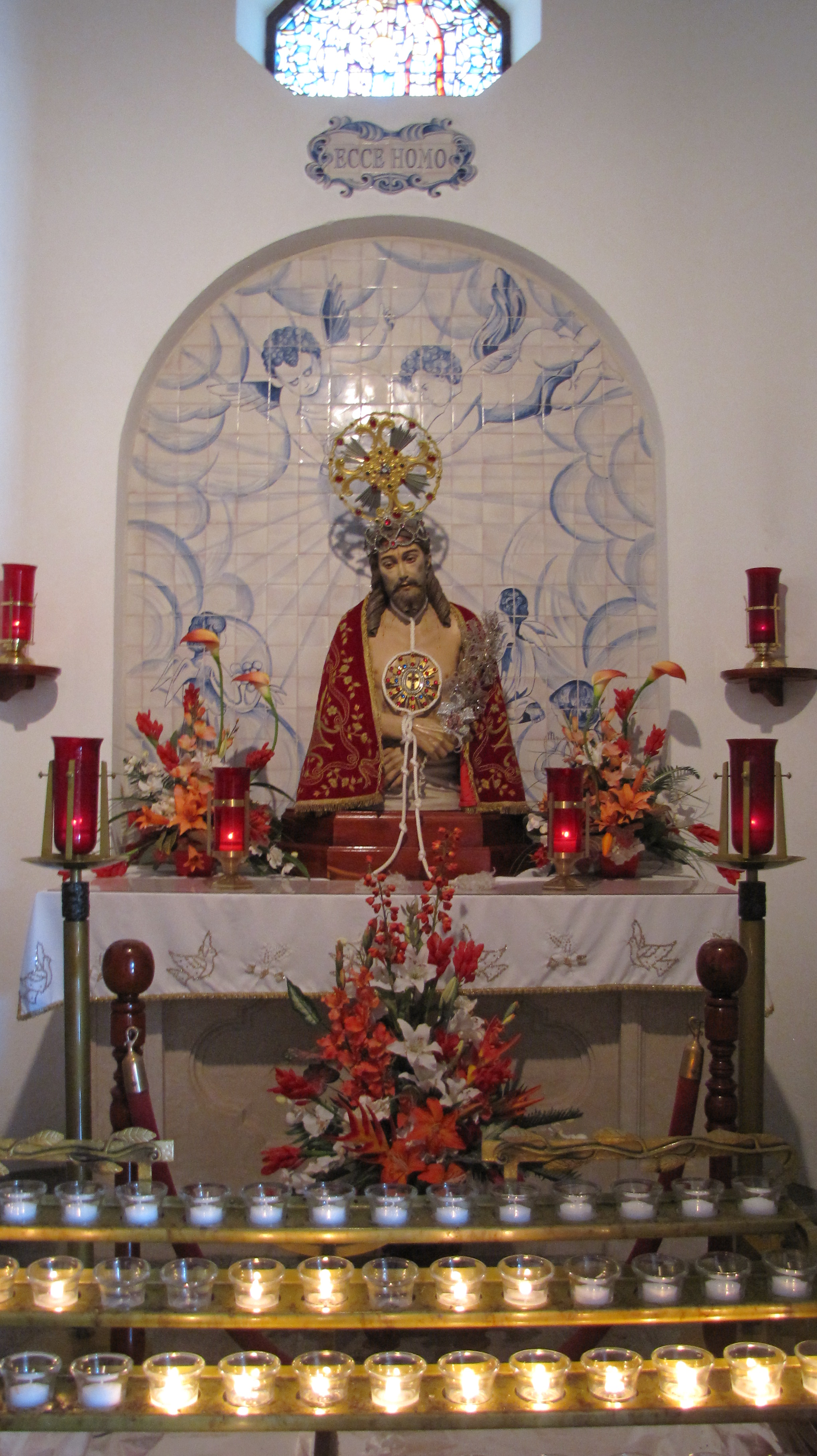
The image of the Lord Holy Christ of the Miracles, devoted by all the Azoreans in Bermuda islands.

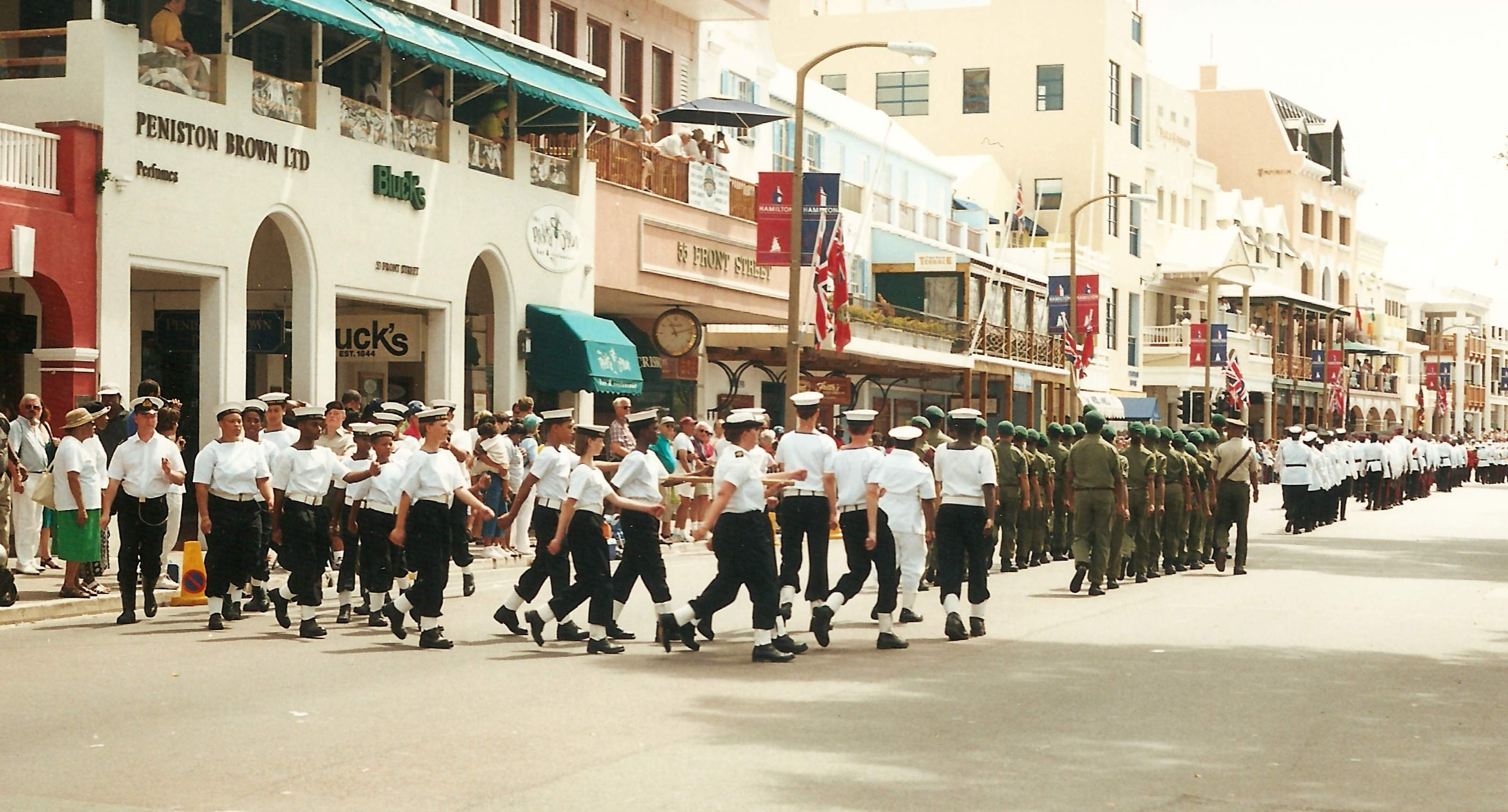
Queen's Birthday Parade on Front Street in June, 2000

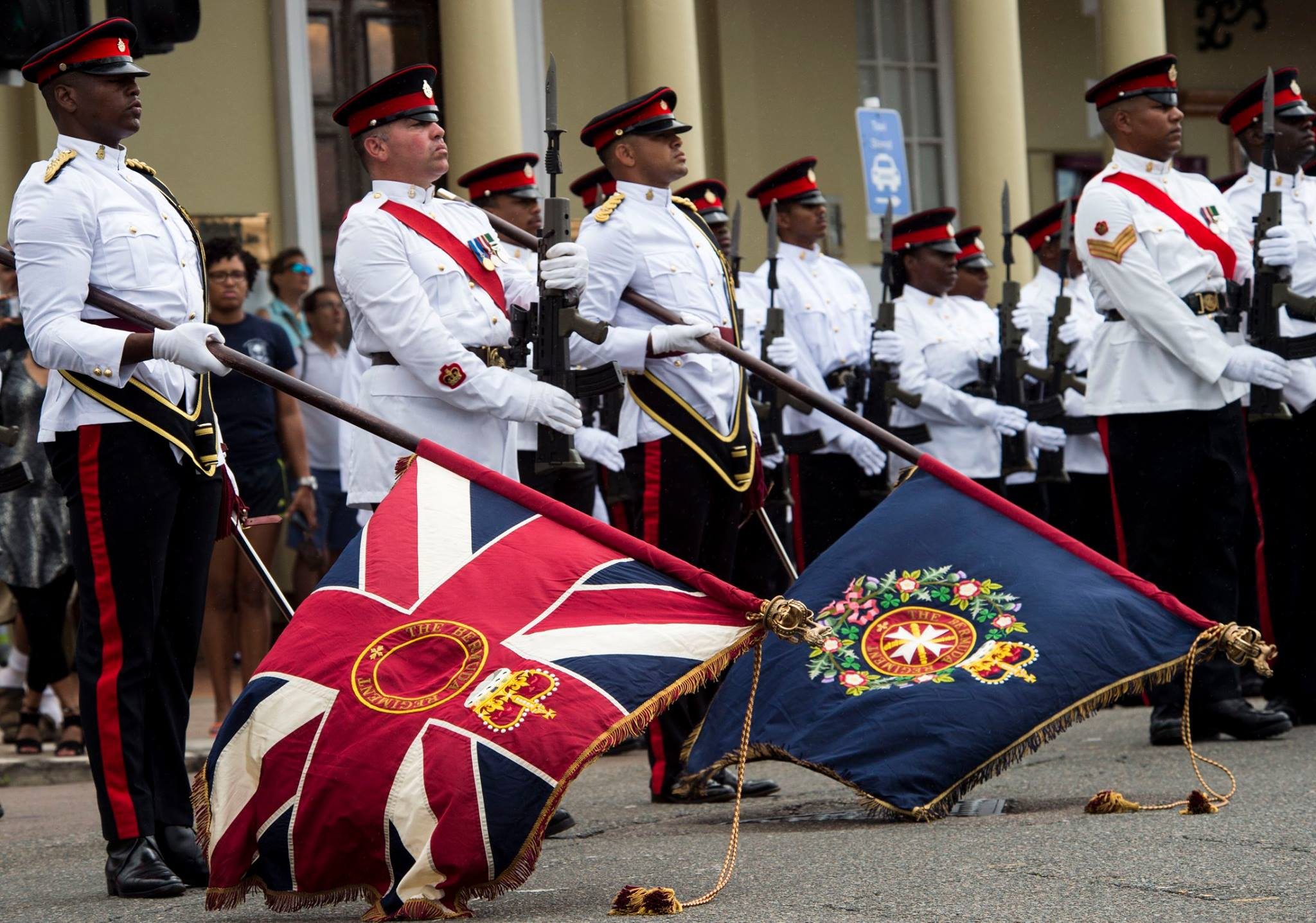
Colour party of the Royal Bermuda Regiment at Queen's Birthday Parade on Front street (at its intersection with Burnaby Street) on 10 June 2017

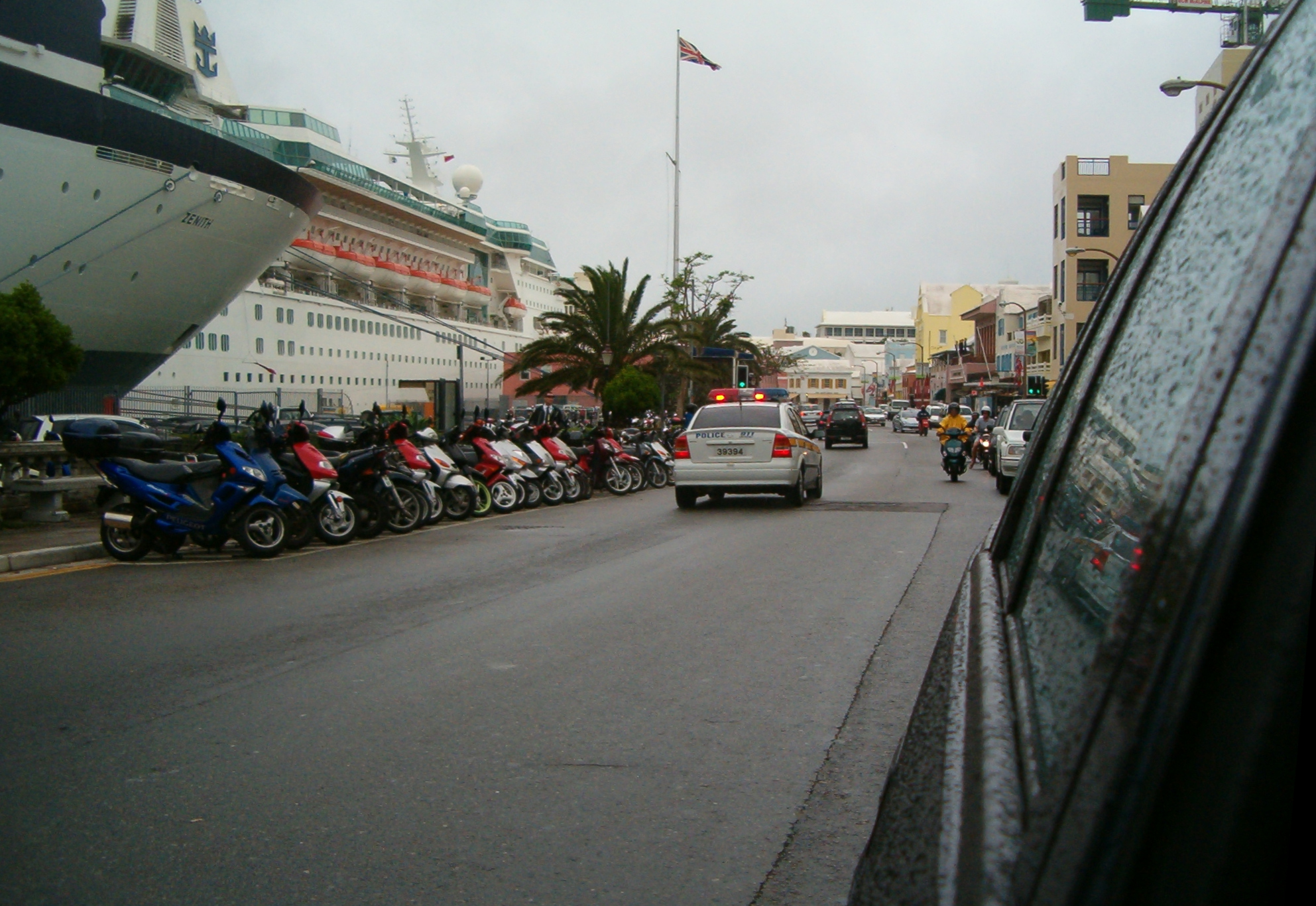
A police car of the Bermuda Police Service drives westward on Front Street on the 6 June 2006, responding to an incident
