= Robert Dehler =

Bermudian Catholic bishop

The Most Reverend Robert Stephen Dehler CR
- Church: Catholic Church
- Diocese: Diocese of Hamilton in Bermuda

Personal details
- Born: 26 December 1889 St Agatha, Canada
- Died: 26 August 1966 (aged 76) Kitchener, Ontario
- Buried: Mount Hope Cemetery, Kitchener, Ontario

Robert Stephen Dehler, CR (26 December 1889 – 26 August 1966) was a Canadian Catholic prelates who served as Bishop of Hamilton in Bermuda from 1956 to 1966. He was a member of the Resurrectionists.

== Biography ==
Dehler was born in St. Agatha, Ontario in 1889, and grew up in Macton, Ontario. He graduated from St. Jerome's College and ordained as a Catholic priest on 19 December 1914.

From 1939 to 1944, he served in Bermuda, and from 1944 to 1950, he served as pastor of St. Mary's Church in Kitchener, followed by an appointment at St. Joseph's Church in Hamilton, Ontario. On 10 March 1953, he was appointed the Prefect Apostolic of Bermuda, and on 28 January 1956 was appointed Vicar Apostolic of Bermuda and Titular Bishop of Clazomenae. He was consecrated bishop on 19 March 1956 by Archbishop Gerald O'Hara at St. Mary's Church in Kitchener, Ontario. Archbishop Joseph Anthony O'Sullivan and Bishop Joseph Francis Ryan served as co-consecrators. He served as Vicar Apostolic of Bermuda until his death in Kitchener on 26 August 1966, and is buried in Mount Hope Cemetery in Kitchener, Ontario.

Catholic Church titles
Preceded by Inaugural appointment	Roman Catholic Bishop of Bermuda; 1956–1966	Succeeded by Bernard James Murphy
