= Robert Kurtz =

American-born Roman Catholic bishop

The Most Reverend Robert Kurtz C.R.
- Bishop Emeritus of Hamilton in Bermuda
- Church: Catholic Church
- Diocese: Diocese of Hamilton in Bermuda
- In office: June 1, 1995 – June 13, 2015
- Predecessor: Brian Hennessy
- Successor: Wiesław Śpiewak
- Previous post: Superior general of the Resurrectionists (1981-1993)

Orders
- Ordination: March 11, 1967 by Joseph Ritter
- Consecration: September 15, 1995 by Eugenio Sbarbaro

Personal details
- Born: Robert Joseph Kurtz; July 25, 1939 (age 86) Chicago, Illinois, United States

Robert Joseph Kurtz, C.R. (born July 25, 1939) is an American Catholic retired prelate who served as Bishop of Hamilton in Bermuda from 1995 to 2015. He is a member of the Resurrectionists and served as superior general of the order from 1981 to 1993.
