= St. John's College (Brantford) =

Location
- 80 Paris Road; Brantford, Ontario, N3R 1H9; Canada; 43.16030°N 80.28845°W

Information
- School type: Catholic high school
- Religious affiliation: Catholic
- Founded: 1941
- School board: Brant Haldimand Norfolk Catholic District School Board
- School number: 751898
- Principal: Mirona Dragicevic
- Grades: 9–12
- Enrollment: 1,105 (2019/2020)
- Language: English
- Colour: Green
- Mascot: Eagle
- Website: www.sjconline.ca

St. John's College (SJC) is a Roman Catholic high school located in Brantford, Ontario, Canada.

== History ==
=== Origins ===
In 1941, Brantford Catholic High School opened in the basement of St. Ann's Elementary School with just one Grade 9 class. A new class was added each year until 1951 when the school moved to Dufferin Avenue. From 1951 to 1978, the priests of the Congregation of the Resurrection acted as the principals. In 1959, the school's name changed to St. John's College.

=== Providence College ===
Providence College was a girls' school opened in 1961 by the Sisters of Providence of St. Vincent de Paul on the site of St. Bernard's Elementary School, which has since been absorbed into St. Pius and moved to a brand new campus. At that time, it was a grades 9-12 school and girls wanting to attend university would transfer to St. John's College for grade 13. It was decided that St. John's College would absorb Providence College and move to the latter's newer Paris Road campus. The merger was finalised by the 1970-71 academic year.

=== Growth and expansion (1980s to present day) ===
In the 1980s, the student population grew to the extent that Dufferin Avenue campus was reopened to accommodate the surge in student numbers and the school operated as a dual-site campus for a period of time. A new cafeteria, triple gym, teacher lounge, and 13 classrooms were constructed with help from community fundraising. In 1989, more additions were made with the addition of the current main entrance, 9 classrooms, administrative offices, the 'cafetorium', health center and guidance center. In 1991, enrolment exceeded 1700 students. This necessitated the opening of Assumption College in September 1992, as well as Holy Trinity Catholic High School in Simcoe, Ontario in 2001.

== Curriculum ==
The school offers mainstream Ontario Secondary School Diploma subjects. Several Advanced Placement subjects are offered.

Alongside their academics, students have the option to gain practical work experience through apprenticeships and internships under the auspices of the Brant Haldimand Norfolk Catholic District School Board. The BHNCDSB runs a Ministry-approved co-op program and participates in the Ontario Youth Apprenticeship Program (OYAP).

== Athletics ==
The school's sports teams compete as the Green Eagles and are members of the District 5/9 (AABHN) in the Central Western Ontario Secondary Schools Association. Sports offered include basketball, soccer, cheerleading, rugby, volleyball, football, baseball, softball, track and field, golf, wrestling, badminton, curling, fly fishing and tennis. The 2009 senior girls' basketball team captured the AAAA OFSAA gold medal on November 28, 2009. The Eagles finished the season with a perfect 45-0 record.

== See also ==
- Education in Ontario
- List of secondary schools in Ontario
