= Cathedral of Saint Theresa of Lisieux =

Roman Catholic cathedral in Bermuda

Coordinates: 32°17′50″N 64°47′04″W

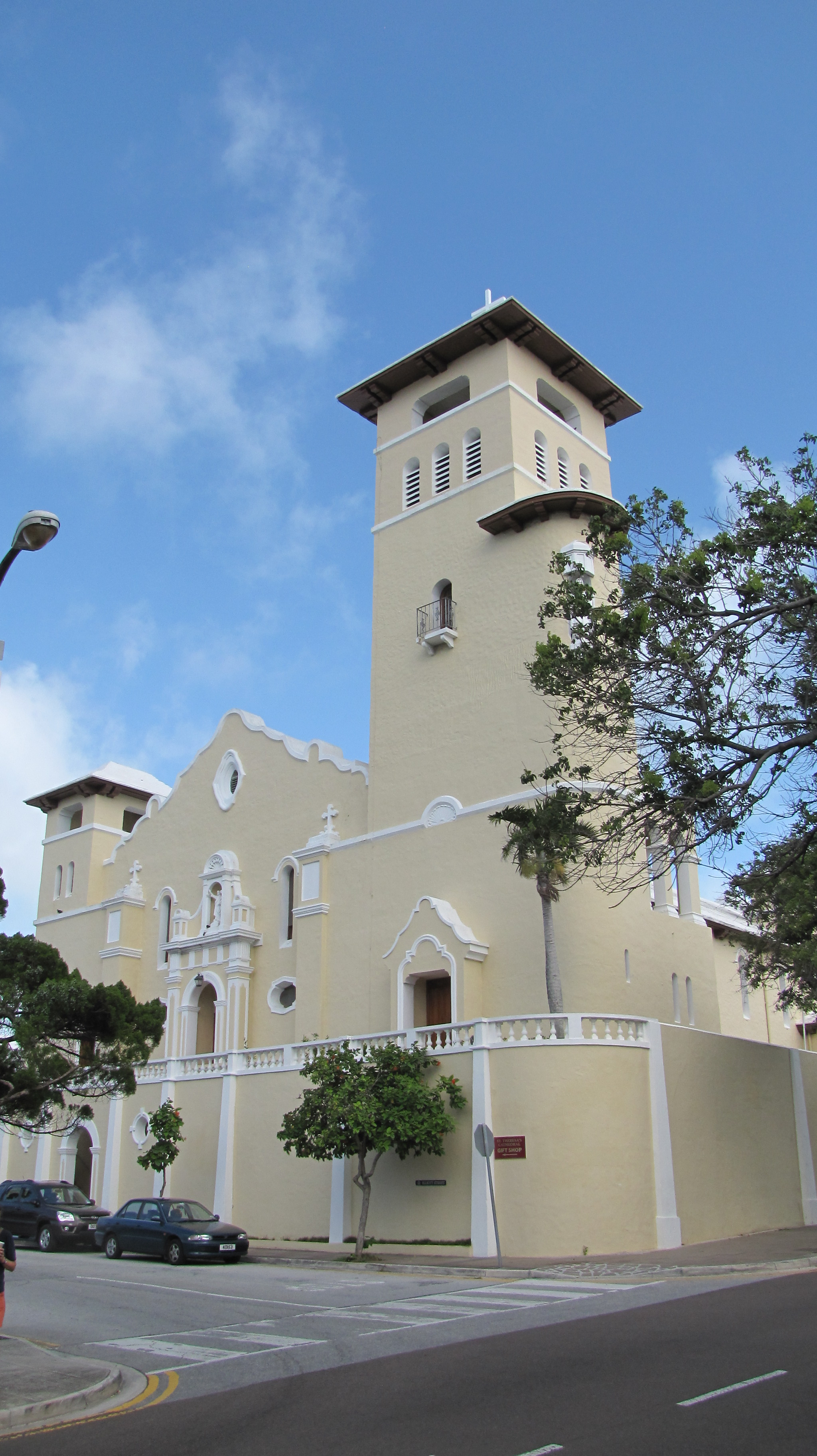
The Cathedral of Saint Theresa of Lisieux

The Cathedral of Saint Theresa of Lisieux, or the Cathedral of Saint Theresa of the Little Flower, normally referred to as St. Theresa's Cathedral, is a Roman Catholic cathedral in Hamilton, in the British Overseas Territory of Bermuda. It is one of two cathedrals in Hamilton, the other being that of the state church, the Anglican church of Bermuda (before 1978, a bishopric of the Church of England), the Cathedral of the Most Holy Trinity. St. Theresa's is the seat of the Catholic Bishop of Bermuda.

Catholicism, along with any other denomination not considered part of the Church of England and any non-Christian faiths, was outlawed in Bermuda, as in the rest of English territory, from the time of settlement (1609 to 1612). Enfranchisement of Catholics in Britain and the colonies followed the incorporation of the Kingdom of Ireland within the Kingdom of Great Britain, to form the United Kingdom of Great Britain and Ireland in 1801. The Roman Catholic Relief Act 1829 allowed British and Irish Catholics to sit in the Parliament.

== Description ==
In Bermuda, Presbyterian and Methodist churches operated alongside the Church of England. The law in Bermuda permitted any church that legally operated in the United Kingdom to do so in the colony. Although the Roman Catholic Church began to operate openly in Bermuda in the 19th century, its priests were not allowed, at first, to conduct baptisms, weddings or funerals. With large numbers of Catholic soldiers, particularly from Ireland, serving in the Bermuda Garrison, the first Catholic services were conducted by British Army chaplains during the 19th Century. Mount Saint Agnes Academy, a private school operated by the Roman Catholic Church, and located within sight of the cathedral, opened in 1890 at the behest of officers of the 86th (Royal County Down) Regiment of Foot (which was posted to Bermuda from 1880 to 1883), who had requested from the Archbishop of Halifax, Nova Scotia as school for the children of Irish Catholic soldiers. The numbers of Catholics also began to increase from the 1840s onwards due to the encouragement of immigration of labourers from Portuguese islands, such as the Azores. Today, Portuguese-Bermudians represent at least ten percent of the population, and the Roman Catholic Church is the second largest denomination, with fifteen percent of the population (the Anglican church is the largest, with twenty-three percent, while all the Protestant churches, together, account for fifty-two percent).

St. Theresa's was consecrated in 1932, having been built on Cedar Avenue, in Hamilton, on land obtained in 1915 by Father Isaac Comeau. It subsequently became a Cathedral upon the creation of the Roman Catholic Diocese of Hamilton in Bermuda in 1967. It was built in a style reminiscent of Iberian architecture, rather than that of traditional Bermudian architecture, or the Gothic style of the Anglican cathedral. It was named in honour of its patron saint, Thérèse of Lisieux, who was known as the Little Flower of Jesus.
