= Diocese of Hamilton in Bermuda =

Latin Catholic ecclesiastical jurisdiction in Bermuda

Coordinates: 32.2970°N 64.7848°W

Diocese of Hamilton in Bermuda Dioecesis Hamiltonensis in Bermuda
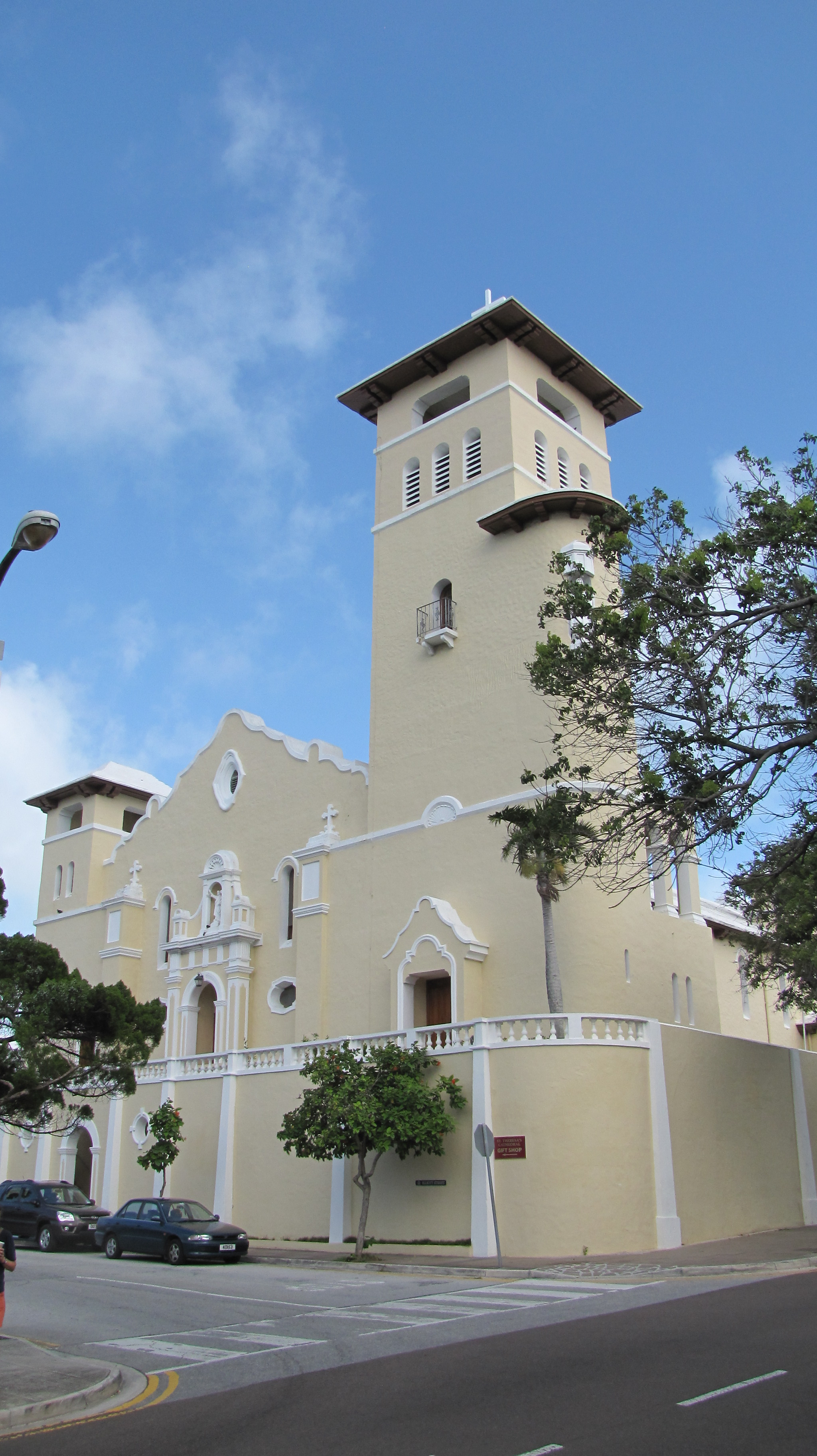
- St. Theresa's Cathedral

- Coat of arms

Location
- Country: United Kingdom
- Territory: Bermuda
- Ecclesiastical province: Province of Nassau
- Metropolitan: Hamilton

Statistics
- Area: 20 km^{2} (7.7 sq mi)
- Population: Total; Catholics: (as of 2022); 62,102; 9,250 (14.9%)

Information
- Denomination: Catholic Church
- Sui iuris church: Latin Church
- Rite: Roman Rite
- Established: 19 February 1953
- Cathedral: Cathedral of Saint Theresa of Lisieux
- Patron saint: St. Therese of Lisieux

Current leadership
- Pope: Leo XIV
- Bishop: Wiesław Śpiewak
- Metropolitan Archbishop: Patrick Christopher Pinder
- Bishops emeritus: Robert Kurtz

Website
- www.romancatholicbermuda.bm

The Diocese of Hamilton in Bermuda (Latin: Dioecesis Hamiltonensis in Bermuda) is a diocese of the Latin Church of the Catholic Church in North America. The diocese comprises the entirety of the dependency of Bermuda. The diocese is a suffragan of the Archdiocese of Nassau, and a member of the Antilles Episcopal Conference.

The diocese of Hamilton was erected in 1953 out of the Archdiocese of Halifax-Yarmouth in Nova Scotia, Canada (Bermuda having historically been part of British North America) as the Prefecture Apostolic of Bermuda Islands. It was elevated to an apostolic vicariate in January 1956 and to the Diocese of Hamilton in Bermuda in June 1967.

== Ordinaries ==
- Robert Dehler (1954–1966)
- Bernard Murphy (1967–1974)
- Brian Hennessy (1975–1995)
- Robert Kurtz (1995–2015)
- Wiesław Śpiewak (2015–)
