= Resurrectionists (Catholic) =

Roman Catholic religious order

Congregation of the Resurrection of Our Lord Jesus Christ
- Latin: Congregatio a Resurrectione Domini Nostri Jesu Christi
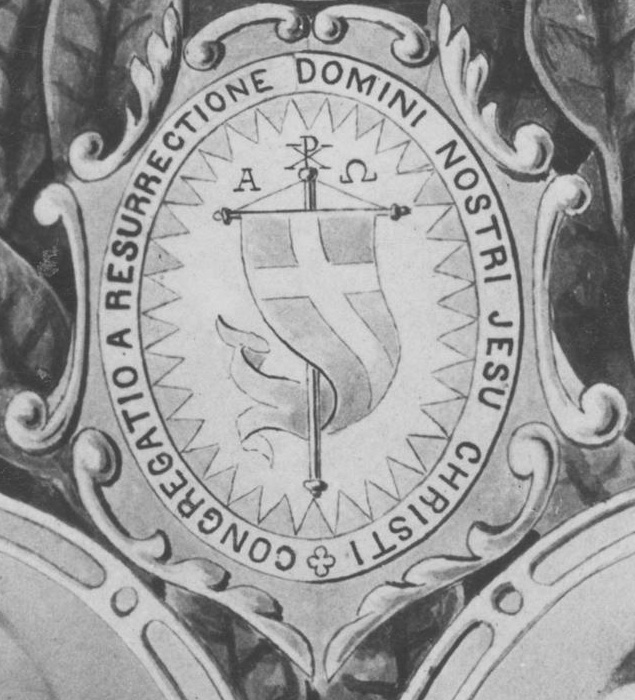
- Emblem of the congregation
- Abbreviation: CR
- Nickname: Resurrectionists
- Formation: 17 February 1836 (190 years ago)
- Founders: Fr. Piotr Semenenko, CR; Fr. Hieronim Kajsiewicz, CR; Fr. Bogdan Jański, CR
- Founded at: Paris, France
- Type: Clerical religious congregation of pontifical right for men
- Headquarters: Via S. Sebastianello 11, Rome, Italy
- Members: 309 members (includes 264 priests) as of 2020
- Superior General: Fr. Paul Voisin, C.R
Countries served
| Austria Belarus Bulgaria Germany; Italy; Poland Ukraine Slovakia | Canada United States Bolivia; Brazil Australia Bermuda Mexico; Israel |
- Parent organization: Roman Catholic Church
- Website: resurrectionists.com

The Resurrectionists, officially named the Congregation of the Resurrection of Our Lord Jesus Christ (Latin: Congregatio a Resurrectione Domini Nostri Jesu Christi; abbreviated CR), is a Catholic clerical religious congregation of pontifical right for men. It was founded in 1836 by three men: Bogdan Jański, Peter Semenenko and Hieronim Kajsiewicz on the heels of the Polish Great Emigration.

== History ==
The Congregation of the Resurrection began in Paris on Ash Wednesday of 1836. Bogdan Janski, Peter Semenenko, and Jerome Kajsiewicz, the first three members, are regarded as the founders.

As a university student in Warsaw, Janski became involved in various student movements. He then studied economics in France, England, and Germany. Disenchanted with various social movements, he began to assist Polish exiles living in France, where he worked as a tutor. He supplemented his meager income as a contributor to encyclopedic dictionaries and dispersed his funds among poor Polish exiles throughout France.

Janski sent two of his associates, Peter Semenenko and Jerome Kajsiewicz to Rome to work on re-establishing the Polish college to educate priests for Poland. Joining them, the three established a small community. Semenenko and Kajsiewicz were ordained in 1842. Pope Pius IX advised them to "Organize yourselves in a way that will do the most good for the Church". The name of the Congregation refers to the bells sounded in Rome at noon on Easter Sunday, 1842, when the first seven brothers left the Catacombs of San Sebastiano, near San Sebastiano fuori le mura, after their religious vows.

In 1866 the Collegio Polacco (Polish College) college was finally opened due to the efforts of the Congregation of the Resurrection, which raised the first funds to which Princess Odelscalchi, Pius IX, and others contributed later.

As consecrated religious, resurrectionists profess the vows of poverty, chastity and obedience.

By our vows of poverty, chastity and obedience, we dedicate and consecrate ourselves totally to the Risen Christ in the religious life. This dedication entails an act of faith whereby we respond to God’s call to give ourselves completely with all our talents, abilities, and powers to Him, to the Church, and to the Congregation

— Constitutions of the Congregation of the Resurrection, article 13

Their life as consecrated religious within the Congregation of the Resurrection is fulfilled as a Priest, Brother or Permanent Deacon.

Internationally, they are divided into three Provinces and one Region, ministering in sixteen countries worldwide. The Community works and has its missions in Italy, Poland, Bulgaria, Austria, Germany, Canada, the United States, Brazil, Bolivia, Australia, Bermuda, Mexico, Ukraine, Belarus, Slovakia, and Israel. The Congregation has its Motherhouse in Rome. The superior general and the general council are located there. The current superior general is the Fr. Evandro Miranda Rosa, CR.

One of the principal aims of the Congregation is providing and improving religious education.

== See also ==
- Polish Cathedral style
- Roman Catholicism in Poland
- Polonia
- Bl. Alicja Kotowska
- St. Hyacinth Basilica
- St. Hedwig's in Chicago
- St. John Cantius in Chicago
- St. Stanislaus Kostka Church (Chicago, Illinois)
- St. Wenceslaus in Chicago
