= Humboldt Park riot =

1977 riot in Chicago, Illinois

Humboldt Park Riots
- Date: June 4–5, 1977
- Location: Chicago, Illinois, United States

Parties
Puerto Rican Chicago residents	Chicago Police

Casualties and losses
Killed: 3; Wounded: 97; Arrested: 164	Wounded: 56

The Humboldt Park riot was the second major conflict between Puerto Ricans in Chicago and the Chicago Police Department. The riot began on June 4, 1977, and lasted a day and a half. Following the shooting deaths of two Puerto Rican men, locals (mostly young Puerto Ricans) battled Chicago police officers in Humboldt Park and in the streets surrounding. The riot led the community to hold the Division Street Puerto Rican Day Parade, which started in 1978.

== Background ==
West Town area of the city of Chicago, in the state of Illinois

As a result of harsh conditions in Puerto Rico and incentives to come to mainland America, Puerto Rican migration to Chicago spiked during the 1950s and 60s. Puerto Rican communities in the city were then displaced by highway construction, urban renewal, and public housing projects. The Puerto Rican population moved from the Near West Side and the Near North Side to West Town and Humboldt Park, areas of white working-class neighborhoods, populated by European immigrants and their children. New Puerto Rican arrivals joined the new Puerto Rican enclaves in West Town and Humboldt Park. By 1960, 25% of the city's Puerto Rican population lived in West Town. Most Puerto Ricans faced racial tensions with their white neighbors and especially with white authorities. They encountered police brutality, high unemployment, housing discrimination and poor housing conditions, and poverty.

=== 1966 Division St. Riots ===
Beginning on June 12, 1966, the Division Street riots affected the Humboldt Park area. Puerto Ricans were gathered in the streets, celebrating after a parade downtown. The celebration was in honor of St. John the Baptist, after whom San Juan, Puerto Rico is named. In 1966, the parade for this celebration was officially renamed the Puerto Rican Parade. After a white police officer shot and wounded a young Puerto Rican man, a riot began and continued for three days, in spite of police efforts. The riot signified the difficult conditions Puerto Ricans faced in Chicago, including high unemployment, low income, racial discrimination, poor housing, and inadequate education. In the aftermath of the riot, new community organizations and community leaders more actively engaged in city politics to work to improve conditions for Puerto Ricans in Chicago.

According to a University of Chicago study, in the years following the 1966 riot, Puerto Ricans ranked police relations as their second biggest problem after unemployment. Although community members spent a decade working for better conditions, in 1977, Puerto Ricans in Chicago still faced myriad issues. They experienced displacement, housing discrimination, racism, unemployment, poor housing, poverty, and police brutality.

=== FALN bombing ===
On June 4, 1977, several hours before the Humboldt Park riot, a bomb went off on the fifth floor of the Cook County Building, outside the offices of acting Mayor Michael Bilandic and George Dunne, the president of the Cook County Board of Commissioners. No one was harmed, but the blast blew out windows and caused $6,000 in damages. FALN, a separatist group for Puerto Rican independence, claimed credit via a phone call to radio station WBBM-FM. The following year, the committee in charge of the Puerto Rican Parade moved the parade date to June 24 to avoid possible associations between June 4 bombings and the parade.

== Riot ==
The details of the beginning of the riot are disputed. It began in Humboldt Park on June 4, 1977, after the Puerto Rican Day Parade. The festivities are misattributed in some print news as a celebration for "Puerto Rican Independence Day". Violence began around 6 o'clock in the evening and lasted until around midnight. The riot began in Humboldt Park itself, near the intersection of Division Street and California Avenue.

According to the police, the violence began with gang-related shooting in the park. Police Superintendent James M. Rochford issued a nine-page report on June 14, 1977, which declared that seven other people in the park were hurt by gang gunfire before the police began shooting. The gangs in question were the rival Puerto Rican street gangs the Latin Kings and the Spanish Cobras. Sergeant Thomas Walton shot and killed Julio Osorio, 26. Rafael Cruz, 25, was also killed by a bullet from Sgt. Walton's gun. Preliminary autopsy reports showed both Osorio and Cruz were shot in the back. The family of Rafael Cruz recounted that Cruz came to Humboldt Park with his mother and brother, where they walked arm in arm. Later, Cruz was running out of the park, to a car where his niece was waiting, when police shot him in the back.

According to the Chicago Tribune, on late Saturday afternoon, police arrived to Humboldt Park to break up gang-related fighting. When police were arresting one of the combatants, the young man resisted, and "picnickers became angry and began hurling objects." The New York Times printed that following the shooting of Osorio and Cruz, the police tried to close the park and "were met with a barrage of bricks, bottles, stones, sticks and chairs, but Hispanic witnesses charged that policemen stormed the park with nightsticks and attacked many picnickers, including families with children." The account continues to state that the riot escalated because police were outnumbered (Chicago police officers were stationed in large numbers at Soldier Field for a rock concert that day). Another account describes police arriving to respond to reports of gang activity in part of Humboldt Park, to find a park full of Spanish-speaking people congregating. The presence of police, and perhaps some provocation by police, started the riot.

During the first day of the riot, two people were killed (Osorio and Cruz), approximately 3,000 people were involved, 116 people were injured, 119 were arrested, and 38 police officers and 3 firefighters were injured. Rioters threw rocks, bottles, and Molotov cocktails. The police department reported that 17 police cars and trucks were damaged during the riot. One police officer was seen setting fire to a fallen Puerto Rican flag, waving the burning flag, and stepping on it.

Acting Mayor Bilandic came to Humboldt Park and the riot area for about 15 minutes after the violence died down, late Saturday night. Police helicopters hovered over the Division Street area during the riot. Approximately 200 police officers in riot gear, some on horseback, worked to clear the streets. However, as soon as the police moved on to another area, the crowd would return.

On Sunday morning, police set up a command post in the park as firefighters and public works crews cleaned the area. The buildup of police and the activity drew a crowd of hundreds of people, mostly young. Minor vandalism and looting began in the afternoon, and police asked bars and businesses to close. Rioters threw rocks, bottles, and Molotov cocktails for the second night in a row. Official cleanup of the park began on Monday, and three civilian cars were removed from the lagoon.

=== Car chase with the police ===
During the riot on Sunday night, 23-year-old Luis Velasquez ran down police Sergeant William Diaz. Velasquez drove off, and engaged in a chase with the police that reached speeds of 80 m.p.h. Velasquez was arrested and charged with two counts of attempted murder, aggravated battery, reckless driving, resisting arrest, and possession of controlled substances.

=== Fires ===
According to a witness, by evening, the police closed off the streets surrounding Division and California. People ran through this area to avoid confrontation with the police. Others were scared, as a building fires burned, while the fire department did not respond or work to control the blaze. Official accounts explain that firefighters were not sent in to control the fires because the police could not guarantee their safety. These fires left 15 families homeless.

Four days after the riot, the body of Domingo Torres Claudio, 62, was found in the rubble of the grocery store below the apartment where he lived. On Saturday night, rioters looted the grocery store, then started a fire. When the fire department came, rioters shot at the firefighters. The building burned while the police and fire departments regrouped. Claudio was a retired factory worker and lived alone.

== Aftermath ==
The police response to the riot constituted much of the controversy in its aftermath. Following the 1968 Chicago riots, John S. Boyle, Chief Judge of the Circuit Court of Cook County, handed down orders for "mass arrests", when 50 or more people are arrested at one incident. Although these orders were still in place, and over 100 people were arrested on the night of June 4, mass arrest protocol was not followed. As a result, there were no interpreters, the people arrested at the riot were unable to contact their families, get medical attention, or meet with attorneys one-on-one. Some community members reported that some of those arrested were held overnight in police vehicles. Nearly half of those arrested on the first night still had not made bond by the time of their hearings. The Cook County Special Bail Project Inc., a local group that helped disadvantaged defendants obtain release from jail on bail, prepared a report that charged that the failure of police to call for mass arrest procedures constituted a violation of rights. The chief of the Chicago Police Department's patrol division, John McInerney, said that he made a judgement to not call for a mass arrest court, because he felt the defendants from the riot could be processed normally. Processing the arrests took between 13 and 19 hours to complete.

After the riot, police Superintendent Rochford issued a gag order, preventing police officers from discussing the events in Humboldt Park. Members of neighborhood gangs complained of police harassment after the riot. The increased, confrontational policing maintained the tense conditions that led to the riot. Some records show that more Puerto Ricans were being arrested after the weekend of June 4. A week after the riot, to protest against police harassment, Puerto Rican community members held a march from the riot area to the Daley Center, where they held a rally. About 300 people marched, and Maria Cruz, sister of the late Rafael Cruz, and Jenny Osorio, sister of the late Julio Osorio, both spoke at the rally.

In the week following the riot, community members of Humboldt Park met with mayor Bilandic to discuss the weekend's riot. After waiting three hours, the Humboldt Park residents had 20 minutes with the mayor. Puerto Rican community leaders also met with Chicago police officials and Department of Human Services officials for two hours, and expressed their concerns about the community. The city government's only direct response to the riot was a grant of $471,000 to fund community service jobs. Mayor Bilandic appointed deputy commissioner Hugh Osborne and Deputy Police Superintendent Samuel Nolan to represent the city in meetings with Latino community groups, following the riots. Osborne and Nolan fielded the concerns and demands of Puerto Rican community leaders on behalf of the city. Among these demands were more summer jobs in the West Town community, which were initially cut back in the budget.

On July 25, 1979, U.S. Attorney Thomas P. Sullivan announced that no police officers would be prosecuted for the shootings of Osorio and Cruz. After a two-year investigation, Sullivan said that there was not sufficient evidence to establish "willful intent" in the shootings. A federal grand jury was convened, but no indictments were sought. The families of the men killed filed civil damage suits against the policemen involved.

While the 1966 Division Street riots were seen as a turning point in Puerto Rican community action, according to community leader Rev. Jorge Morales, the Humboldt Park riot made the community more apathetic about civic involvement. The increased media attention and coverage of Puerto Rican community issues following the riot did not result in changes or improvements. Michael Rodríguez Muñiz, on the other hand, argued years later that the aftermath of the riot created "a radical consciousness" among Puerto Ricans in Chicago.

== See also ==
- Paseo Boricua
- Puerto Ricans in Chicago
- Division Street riots
- Fuerzas Armadas de Liberación Nacional Puertorriqueña
