= Puerto Rican Arts Alliance =

Non-profit organization based in Chicago, US

The Puerto Rican Arts Alliance is a 501c(3) non-profit organization dedicated to preserving Puerto Rican culture in Chicago by maintaining the traditions of Puerto Rico by promoting various arts, and providing educational opportunities in arts programming. The Puerto Rican Arts Alliance has two locations: the first is in Humboldt Park at 1440 N. Sacramento, on the second floor of the Humboldt Park Fieldhouse in the west wing, while the second is in a former firehouse in Avondale at 3000 N. Elbridge. In 2018 The PRAA celebrated its 20 year anniversary.

== History ==
The Puerto Rican Arts Alliance was founded in 1998 to increase awareness, knowledge and access to the arts by Chicago's Puerto Rican community to provide a venue for emerging artists and musicians to showcase their talents. While the Arts Alliance initially focused in serving the Near Northwest Side, PRAA programs now serve the Chicago metropolitan area and the Midwest.
