= Paul Roldan =

Hipolito (Paul) Roldan, (born 1944 New York City) is an affordable housing developer in Chicago.

In 2001, he participated in a comprehensive community planning effort to manage development in Humboldt Park, Chicago, on the city's west side. The HHDC, along with two other housing development corporations—Latin United Community Housing Development (LUCHA) and Bickerdike Redevelopment Corp., received city funding and support to develop significant affordable housing programs.

In 2005, the organization was ranked fifth among the nation's Latino nonprofits, by Hispanic Business magazine.

He is a ULI inner-city adviser and national trustee. He serves on many committees and boards, including Boston's Housing Partnership Network, and the National Puerto Rican Coalition. He was a participant in President Bill Clinton's economic conferences held in Little Rock, Arkansas, in 1992 and Columbus, Ohio, in 1995.

== Awards ==
- 2009 Lifetime Industry Leadership Award
- 2005 Builder of the Year by El Nuevo Constructor magazine
- 2002 Friend of the Neighborhoods
- 1988 MacArthur Fellows Program
