= Chicago Collections =

Chicago Collections Consortium is a membership organization of more than 60 libraries, museums, historical societies, and other cultural heritage organizations collaborating to preserve and promote the history of the Chicago region.

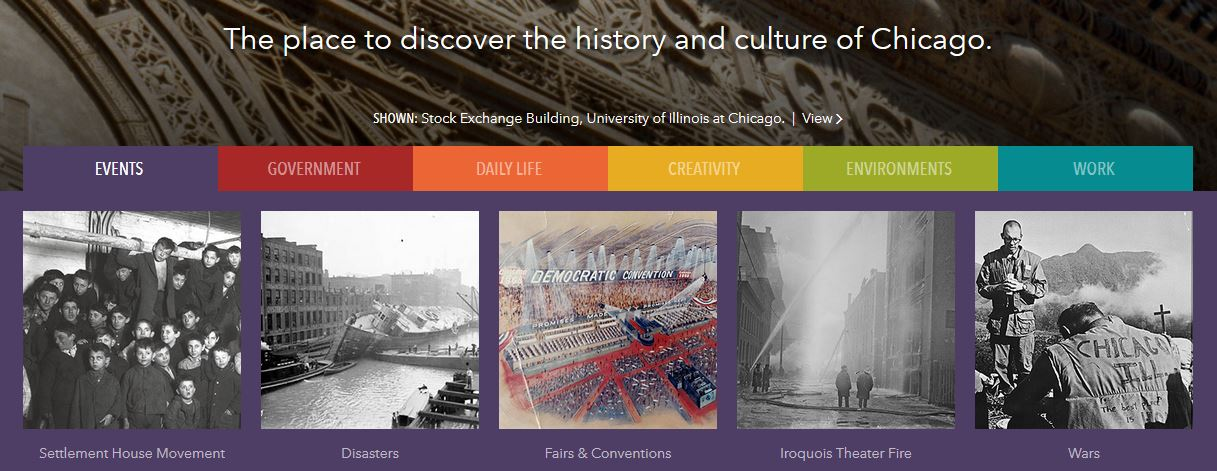
Explore Chicago Collections

== History ==
Launched in 2015 after several years of planning among its charter members, Chicago Collections now sponsors a wide range of educational, community engagement, and professional development programs, including exhibitions and public lectures. Chicago Collections also provides information services such as its Cooperative Reference Network, as well as instructional materials available on member web sites. Chicago Collections has established partnerships with other non-profit organizations in the City of Chicago, including National Public Radio, Chicago Metro History Education Center, and the Library of Congress's Teaching with Primary Sources program, to answer questions about Chicago history from researchers and the general public, and to promote use of member collections and services by teachers and students of all ages.

With funding from The Andrew W. Mellon Foundation, Chicago Collections has developed EXPLORE Chicago Collections (ECC), a digital portal providing access to more than 117,000 images and 6,800 archival collections from member institutions (as of September 2019). The Center for Research Libraries awarded its 2016 Primary Source Award for Access to Tracy J. Seneca (University of Illinois at Chicago), for her role in leading the development of the ECC portal. In celebration of its 10 year anniversary in 2022, CCC, in partnership with The Poetry Foundation and the Chicago Public Library Harold Washington Library Center, launched the annual poetry competition Making History Come Alive Through Words. Aimed at Chicago area high school students, the competition gets students to browse the EXPLORE portal in order to inspire them to write poetry and interact with history.

== Governing Members ==
- Art Institute of Chicago
- Center for Research Libraries
- Chicago History Museum
- Chicago Public Library
- DePaul University
- Illinois Institute of Technology
- Loyola University Chicago
- Newberry Library
- Northwestern University
- Roosevelt University
- University of Chicago
- University of Illinois Chicago

== Participating Members ==
- Chicago State University
- Dominican University
- Evanston History Center
- North Central College
- North Park University
- Museum of Contemporary Art, Chicago
- School of the Art Institute of Chicago

== Associate Members ==
- Adler Planetarium
- Alliance Francaise
- Chicago Botanic Garden
- Chicago Film Archives
- Chicago Transit Authority
- Chicago Women's History Center
- Chinese American Museum of Chicago
- Office of the City Clerk, City of Chicago
- Columbia College Chicago
- Daughters of the American Revolution Chicago Chapter
- Elmhurst University
- Filipino American Historical Society of Chicago Museum
- Friends of Pullman National Historical Park
- Gerber/Hart Library and Archives
- The Grove
- Illinois Holocaust Museum and Education Center
- Japanese American Service Committee
- Lake Forest College
- Leather Archives & Museum
- Lincoln Park Zoo
- Media Burn Independent Video Archive
- National Cambodian Heritage Museum and Killing Fields Memorial
- National Hellenic Museum
- North Central College
- Northeastern Illinois University
- Peggy Notebaert Nature Museum
- Oak Park Public Library
- Poetry Foundation
- Polish Museum of America
- Pritzker Military Museum & Library
- Puerto Rican Arts Alliance
- Rosalind Franklin University of Medicine and Science
- Rush University Medical Center
- Shorefront Legacy Center
- Ukrainian National Museum, Chicago
- Wilmette Historical Museum

== Partner Program ==
- Chicago Cubs
- Henry Crown and Company
- Ozinga
- Union League Club of Chicago
