= Budet =

Budet is a surname. Notable people with the surname include:

- Alain Budet (born 1952), French racing cyclist
- François Budet (1940–2018), French singer-songwriter, novelist, and poet
- Julie Budet, also known as Yelle, French singer
- Osvaldo Budet (born 1979), Puerto Rican artist
