= Puerto Ricans in Chicago =

- Puerto Rican population by census tract as of 2020

Total population
- 206,682 (2023, est.)

Regions with significant populations
- Westside Chicago

Languages
- Puerto Rican Spanish, Inland Northern American English

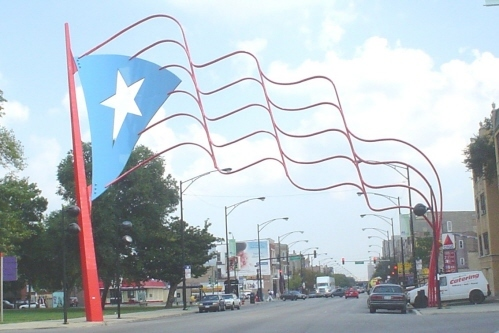
Division Street (Paseo Boricua), facing east from Mozart Street, one-half block west of California Avenue.

Puerto Ricans in Chicago are individuals residing in Chicago with ancestral ties to the island of Puerto Rico. Over more than seventy years, they have made significant contributions to the economic, social, and cultural fabric of the city. The National Museum of Puerto Rican Arts and Culture is located in Humboldt Park, Chicago.

As of 2023, there are 206,682 residents of the Chicago metropolitan area with Puerto Rican heritage, making it the fifth largest metropolitan Puerto Rican community in the mainland US following New York, Orlando, Philadelphia, and Miami, and just ahead of Tampa. These are roughly evenly split between the city of Chicago and its suburbs.

== History ==
The history of the Puerto Rican community in Chicago spans over 70 years. The initial migration in the 1930s was not directly from Puerto Rico but from New York City, with many settling on State Street near downtown hotels. However, the number of individuals joining this migration was relatively small.

A significant wave of migration occurred in the late 1940s, primarily settling in the La Clark neighborhood north of downtown Chicago around Dearborn, La Salle, and Clark Streets. These migrants were recruited as low-wage, non-union foundry workers and domestic workers by companies like Castle Barton Associates. As initial migrants established themselves in Chicago, many were joined by their spouses and families. The construction of the Kennedy Expressway in the late 1950s divided the Puerto Rican neighborhoods of Wicker Park and Lincoln, which were previously one unified neighborhood.

In the 1960s, urban redevelopment displaced the Puerto Rican community in Chicago, leading them to move to areas like Old Town, Lincoln Park, Lakeview, Wicker Park, West Town, and Humboldt Park on the city's West Side. They initially settled in Lincoln Park, but as city-sponsored gentrification took place in the area, the Puerto Rican community moved further north and west. Settlement also occurred in Lawndale on the West Side.

The Division Street riots, which took place from June 12 to 14, 1966, was a significant urban rebellion by the Puerto Rican community in Chicago. These events coincided with the Chicago Police Department's implementation of precautionary measures to prevent unrest similar to what had happened in African American centers such as Harlem, Watts, and North Philadelphia.

In 1977, there was another conflict between the Puerto Rican community and the Chicago Police Department during the Humboldt Park riot.

Year	Puerto Rican population in Chicago	% of Chicago total population
1980	112,074	3.7%
1990	119,866	4.3%
2000	113,055	3.9%
2010	102,703	3.8%
2020	93,193	3.3%

== Present ==
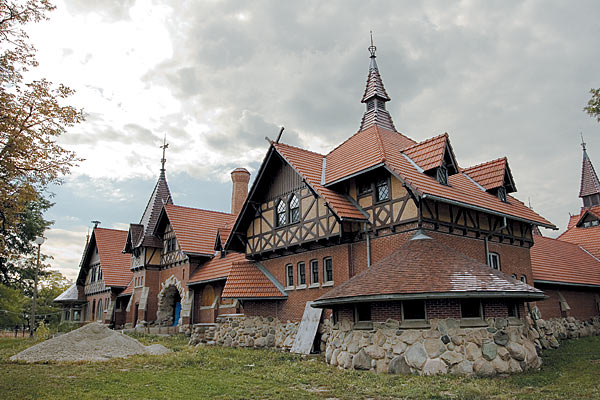
The Institute of Puerto Rican Arts and Culture

The Puerto Rican community in Chicago is known for its established presence and political activism. With the community's support, Puerto Rican leaders in Chicago secured a lease for the historic Humboldt Park stables near Paseo Boricua, which now house the Institute of Puerto Rican Arts and Culture. Renovation efforts for the building involved approximately $3.4 million for the exterior and an additional $3.2 million for the interior in 2006. The Puerto Rican Arts Alliance has also experienced growth and expanded to a second location in Avondale, occupying a former firehouse at the intersection of Central Park and Elbridge Avenues.

Based on the 2020 census, the total number of individuals with full or partial Puerto Rican descent in Chicago was 93,193, accounting for 3.3% of the city's population. This figure represents a decrease from the 102,703 recorded in 2010. A majority of Puerto Ricans in Illinois (53%) now reside outside of Chicago, with 109,351 individuals living in other areas of the state out of a total population of 207,109.

The decline of the Puerto Rican community in Chicago can be attributed to various factors, including:

- limited economic opportunities
- competition from new immigrants
- high crime rates
- high cost of living
- gentrification
- adverse weather conditions
- children relocate to the suburbs or other states
- intermarriage (with a 38.5% intermarriage rate among stateside Puerto Ricans).

Within Chicago, the remaining Puerto Rican community is primarily concentrated on the northwest side of the city. The largest numbers of Puerto Ricans can be found in the community areas of Humboldt Park, Logan Square, Hermosa, Avondale, Austin, Belmont Cragin, Portage Park, and West Town, with Humboldt Park serving as the cultural and commercial center. Areas immediately north and west of Humboldt Park have the highest concentrations of Puerto Ricans in the Chicago area, according to the 2020 Census. Significant Puerto Rican populations are also present in suburban areas of Chicago, including Berwyn, Waukegan, Aurora, Cicero, and Elgin.

== Paseo Boricua ==
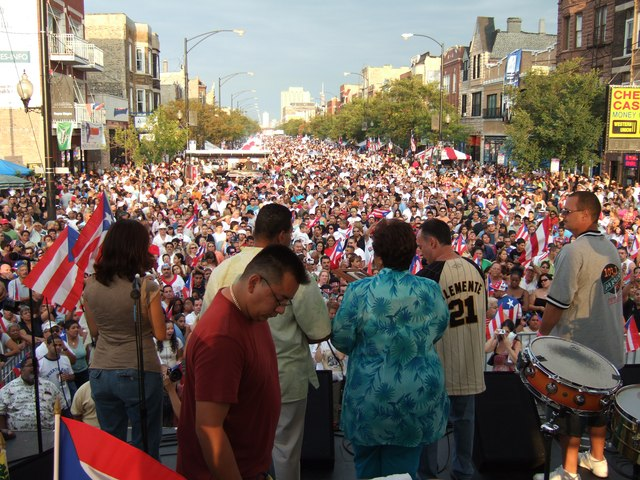
Fiesta Boricua on Paseo Boricua.

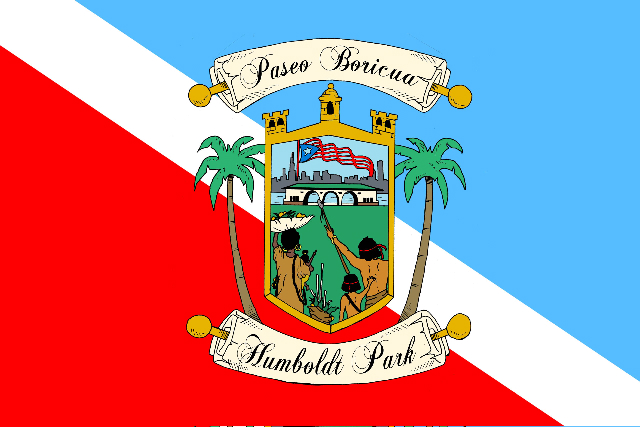
Paseo Boricua is the first location outside the Commonwealth of Puerto Rico to be granted the right to fly an official Municipal Flag of Puerto Rico.

Paseo Boricua, situated on Division Street in the East Humboldt Park section of the West Town neighborhood, is a street section on the West Side of Chicago that represents the Puerto Rican community. It spans between Western Avenue and California Avenue. Paseo Boricua is recognized as the only officially designated Puerto Rican neighborhood in the United States, distinguishing it from New York City, which lacks such a designated area.

The prominent features of Paseo Boricua include two fifty-nine-foot-tall steel Puerto Rican flags that serve as gateways, flanking the street. Many businesses in the area are named after Puerto Rican towns. A walk of fame on the street honors notable Puerto Ricans.

Humboldt Park's Paseo Boricua has been noted as a political and cultural hub of the Puerto Rican community in the Midwest. A culture center has been established, and local Puerto Rican politicians have relocated their offices to Division Street. The City of Chicago has also allocated funds for restoring building facades along Paseo Boricua.

The area has several colorful murals. On two affordable housing buildings, facades mimic the Spanish colonial styles of Old San Juan. Near the high school named after Puerto Rican baseball slugger Roberto Clemente, there is a tile mosaic honoring him.

In June 2024, the part of the Humboldt Park neighborhood in Chicago known as Puerto Rico Town or Paseo Boricua officially changed its name to Barrio Borikén.

== Puerto Rican Parade ==
Currently in its 48th year, the festival held in Humboldt Park has grown to become the largest Latino festival in both the city of Chicago and the Midwest.

== Education and economy ==
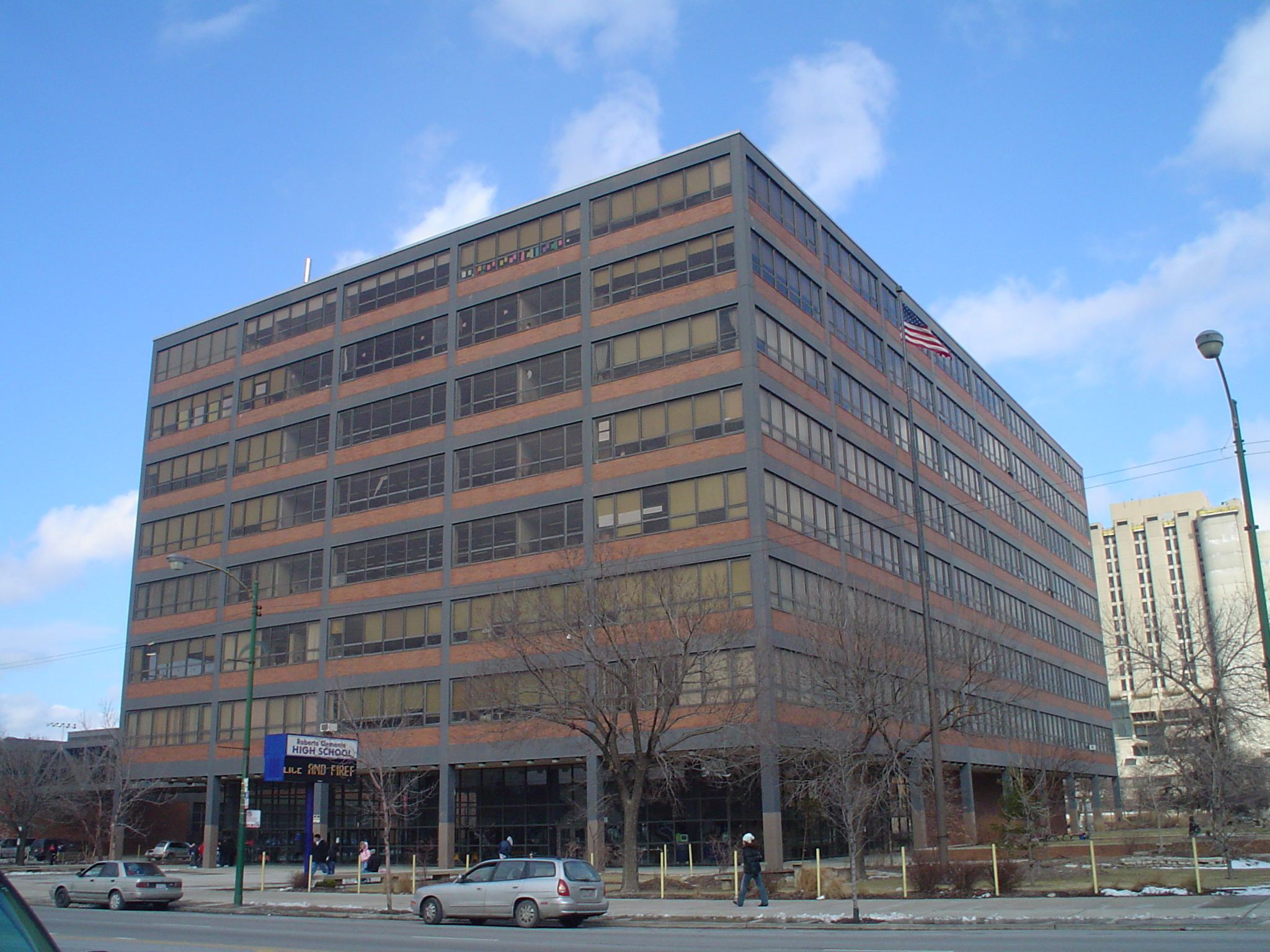
Roberto Clemente Community Academy

According to Gina M. Pérez, the author of "The Near Northwest Side Story: Migration, Displacement, and Puerto Rican Families," Roberto Clemente Community Academy in Chicago is commonly referred to as "the Puerto Rican high school." In Jennifer Domino Rudolph's book, "Embodying Latino Masculinities: Producing Masculatinidad," she states that the school is strongly associated with Puerto Rican cultural nationalism. Ana Y. Ramos-Zayas, the author of "National Performances: The Politics of Class, Race, and Space in Puerto Rican Chicago," mentions that the media has portrayed the school as "the property of Puerto Rican nationalists" and as being connected to Puerto Rico.

As of 2023, only 22.6% of Chicagoland Puerto Ricans had attained a bachelor's degree or higher, though this was slightly higher than the average rate of 19.7% across all Latinos. Chicagoland employed Puerto Ricans over the age of 16 were most commonly employed in Management, business, science, and arts occupations (34.1%), followed by Sales and office occupations (24.1%) and Service occupations (19.7%). The median income among Chicago area Puerto Rican household was $65,459, lower than the $78,085 median among all Latinos.

== See also ==
- Puerto Ricans in the United States
- Demographics of Chicago
- Young Lords
- Latin Kings
- A Latino Resource

== Gallery ==
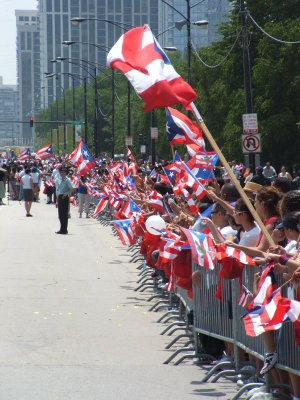
Puerto Rican Day Parade in downtown Chicago.

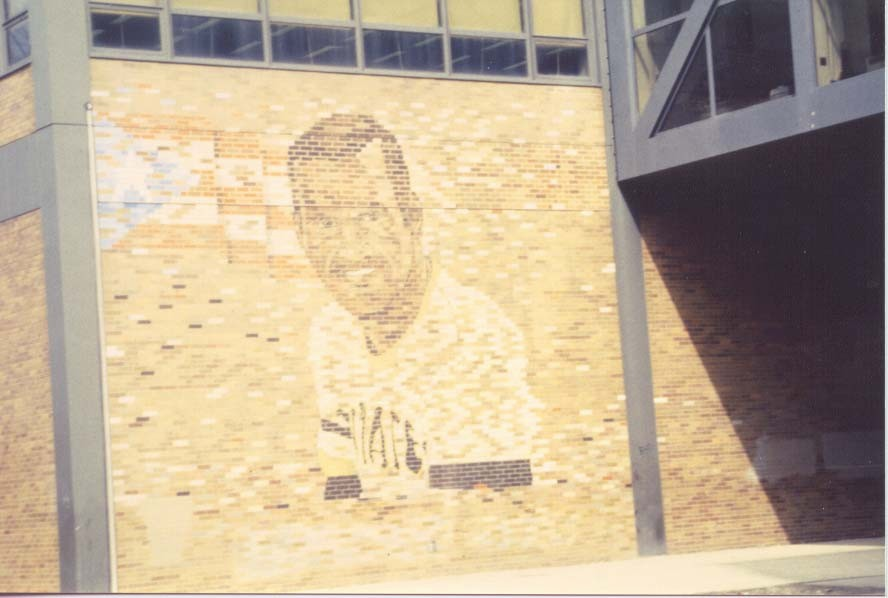
Roberto Clemente high school

Paseo Boricua Walk of Fame (Roberto Clemente)

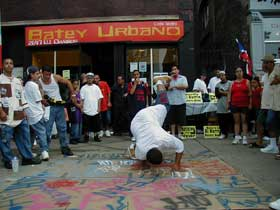
Batey Urbano

La Casita De Don Pedro
