= National Museum of Puerto Rican Arts and Culture =

Museum in Chicago, Illinois

Coordinates: 41°54′8.14″N 87°42′12.11″W

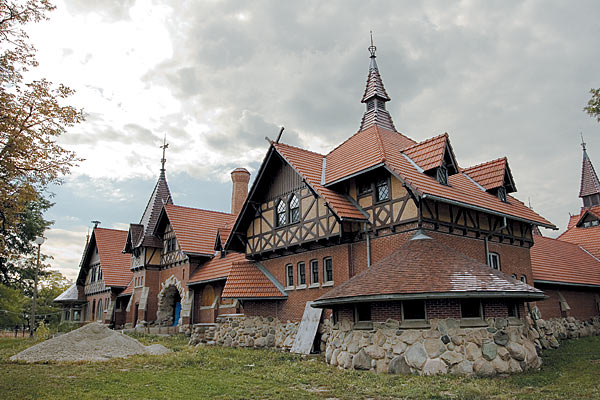
- Established: 2001; in present location since 2009
- Location: 3015 West Division Street; Chicago, Illinois 60622; P: 773.486.8345
- Director: Billy Ocasio
- President: Ray Vázquez
- Website: Official website

The National Museum of Puerto Rican Arts and Culture (formerly Institute of Puerto Rican Arts and Culture) is a museum in Chicago dedicated to interpreting the arts and culture of the Puerto Rican people and of the Puerto Ricans in Chicago. Founded in 2001, it is housed in the historic landmark Humboldt Park stables and receptory, near the Paseo Boricua.

It hosts visual arts exhibitions, community education, and festivals. Its exhibitions have featured the artwork of Osvaldo Budet, Elizam Escobar, Antonio Martorell, Ramon Frade Leon, and Lizette Cruz, in addition to local Chicago or Puerto Rican artists. The Institute also sponsors music events including an annual Navi-Jazz performance, described as a "fusion of Puerto Rican and African American musical elements."

The Institute is a non-profit organization that is supported in part by the Chicago Park District's museum-in-the-parks program. The museum is a member organization of the Chicago Cultural Alliance.

== Institute building ==
The museum complex and the Park (named for Alexander von Humboldt) were added to the National Register of Historic Places in 1991. The building was designated a Chicago Landmark in 2008. The stables and receptory were built by architects Fromman & Jebsen in 1895 as part of the development of the park. They are designed in a "visually dramatic" Queen Anne revival style. In the building's early days, noted landscape architect and Danish immigrant, Jens Jensen, had his park design offices here.

The building suffered a major fire in 1992 but was restored through the efforts of community leaders and the Park District. The Institute led renewal of the interior of the building including galleries, classrooms, and concession facilities.
