= John Guzlowski =

Polish-American author (born 1948)

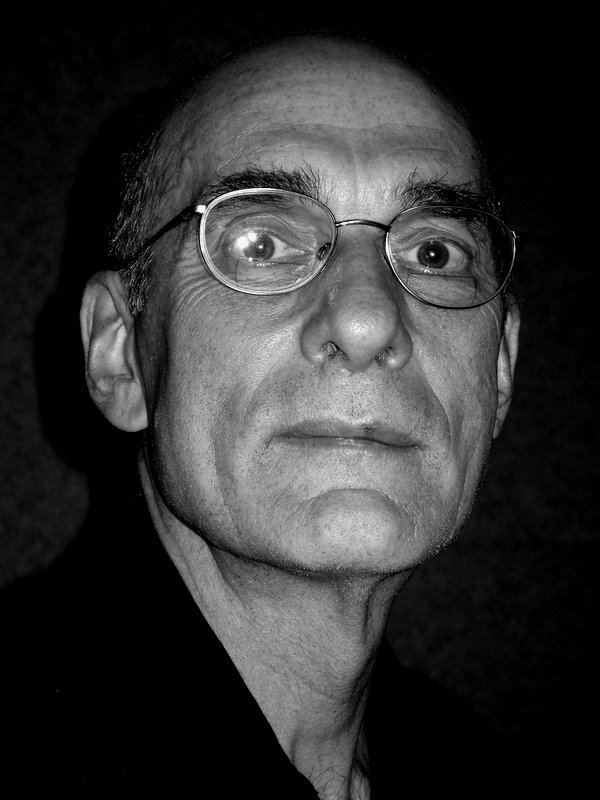
- self-portrait photograph
- Born: 1948 (age 77–78)
- Occupation: Poet
- Writing career
- Period: 1970s–
- Website: lightning-and-ashes.blogspot.com

John Guzlowski (born 1948) is a Polish-American author.

== Personal life ==
John Guzlowski was born the son of parents who met in a Nazi slave labor camp in Germany.

His mother Tekla Hanczarek came from a small community west of Lwów in what was then Poland (modern Lviv, Ukraine) where her father was a forest warden. John's father, Jan, was born in a farming community north of Poznań. John was born Zbigniew Guzlowski in a Displaced Persons camp in Vienenburg, Germany in 1948, and changed his name to John when he was naturalized as an American citizen in 1968.

His parents, his sister Donna, and he came to the US as DPs in 1951. After working on farms in western New York State to pay off their passage to America, they eventually settled in Chicago in the city's old Polish Downtown in the vicinity of St. Fidelis Parish in Humboldt Park.

After attending the University of Illinois in Chicago, he completed a Ph.D. in American literature at Purdue University. He taught literature and creative writing at Eastern Illinois University and retired in 2005.

He lives in Lynchburg, VA, with his wife Linda Calendrillo and his daughter Lillian Guzlowski and granddaughter Lucy Guzlowski.

== Literature ==
Growing up in Chicago's immigrant and displaced person neighborhoods, Guzlowski regularly interacted "with Jewish hardware store clerks with Auschwitz tattoos on their wrists, Polish Cavalry officers who still mourned for their dead horses, and women who walked from Siberia to Iran to escape the Soviets.” Guzlowski would later write that his written work was composed to "try to remember them and their voices."

Guzlowski earned his Ph.D. in English at Purdue University in 1980, and is now retired from Eastern Illinois University, where he taught contemporary American literature and poetry writing. His poems deal with his parents' experiences as slave laborers in Nazi Germany. He has authored three books about his parents' experiences: Echoes of Tattered Tongues: Memory Unfolded (Aquila Polonica), Lightning and Ashes (Steel Toe Books), and Third Winter of War: Buchenwald (Finishing Line Press). These books continue the story of his parents that began in his chapbook Language of Mules which was republished as Język Mułów i Inne Wiersze, a Polish-English edition of this chapbook and other poems, and published by Biblioteka Śląska in Katowice, Poland. His poem "What My Father Believed" was read by Garrison Keillor on the Writers Almanac program. Other poems have appeared in a number of periodicals in the US, Poland, Italy, India, and Hungary, including North American Review, Rattle, Atticus Review, Salon, Margie, Nimrod, Poetry East, Atlanta Review, Crab Orchard Review, Chattahoochee Review, Slask, and Ackent.

Nobel Laureate Czesław Miłosz, in a review of the bilingual edition of Language of Mules, wrote that Guzlowki's work "astonished" him and revealed an "enormous ability for grasping reality."

Professor Thomas Napierkowski has written that "John Guzlowski is arguably the most accomplished Polish-American poet on the contemporary scene, a writer who will figure prominently in any history of Polish-American literature; and 'Lightning and Ashes' firmly establishes Guzlowski's artistic standing not just in Polonia but in the world of American letters."

His essays on contemporary American and Polish authors can be found in such journals as Modern Fiction Studies, Shofar, Critique: Studies in Contemporary Fiction, Polish American Studies, Journal of Evolutionary Psychology, Studies in Jewish American Literature, and The Polish Review.

John Guzlowski received the Benjamin Franklin Award for Poetry from the Independent Book Publishers Association and the Eric Hoffer Foundation's Montaigne Award for Thought Provoking writing for his memoir in prose and poetry Echoes of Tattered Tongues: Memory Unfolded. He also received an Illinois Arts Council Award in 2001. In 2012, he received the Polish American Historical Association Creative Arts Award for his writing and contribution to Polish American Letters.

He is also the author of three mystery novels set in a Polish-American neighborhood in Chicago in the 1950s and 1960s: Suitcase Charlie and Little Altar Boys and Murdertown (all from Kasva Press). He has also written Retreat: A Love Story, a novel about two German Lovers separated during World War II.

He recently published three books of poems, True Confessions and Mad Monk Ikkyu and Small Talk . The first book is a collection of memoir poems that trace his life from the 60s to the present. It is published by Darkhouse Books. The second book follows the adventures of a real zen Buddhist monk as he journeys from the sea to a temple in the mountains of Japan. Finishing Line Press publishes it. His most recent book is the award-winning Small Talk: Poems about God and Writing and Me, published by Snake Nation Press. A collection of his poems, translated into Hindi (Hindi title: यातना शिविर में साथिनें) by Devesh Path Sariya, was published in India in 2023.

Since 2018, Guzlowski has been a columnist for the Dziennik Zwiazkowy, the oldest Polish daily newspaper in America.In 2025, the Polish American Historical Society published a collection of these columns entitled Who I Am: Lives Told in Kitchen Polish.
