= Humboldt Park (Chicago park) =

Public park in Chicago, Illinois, US

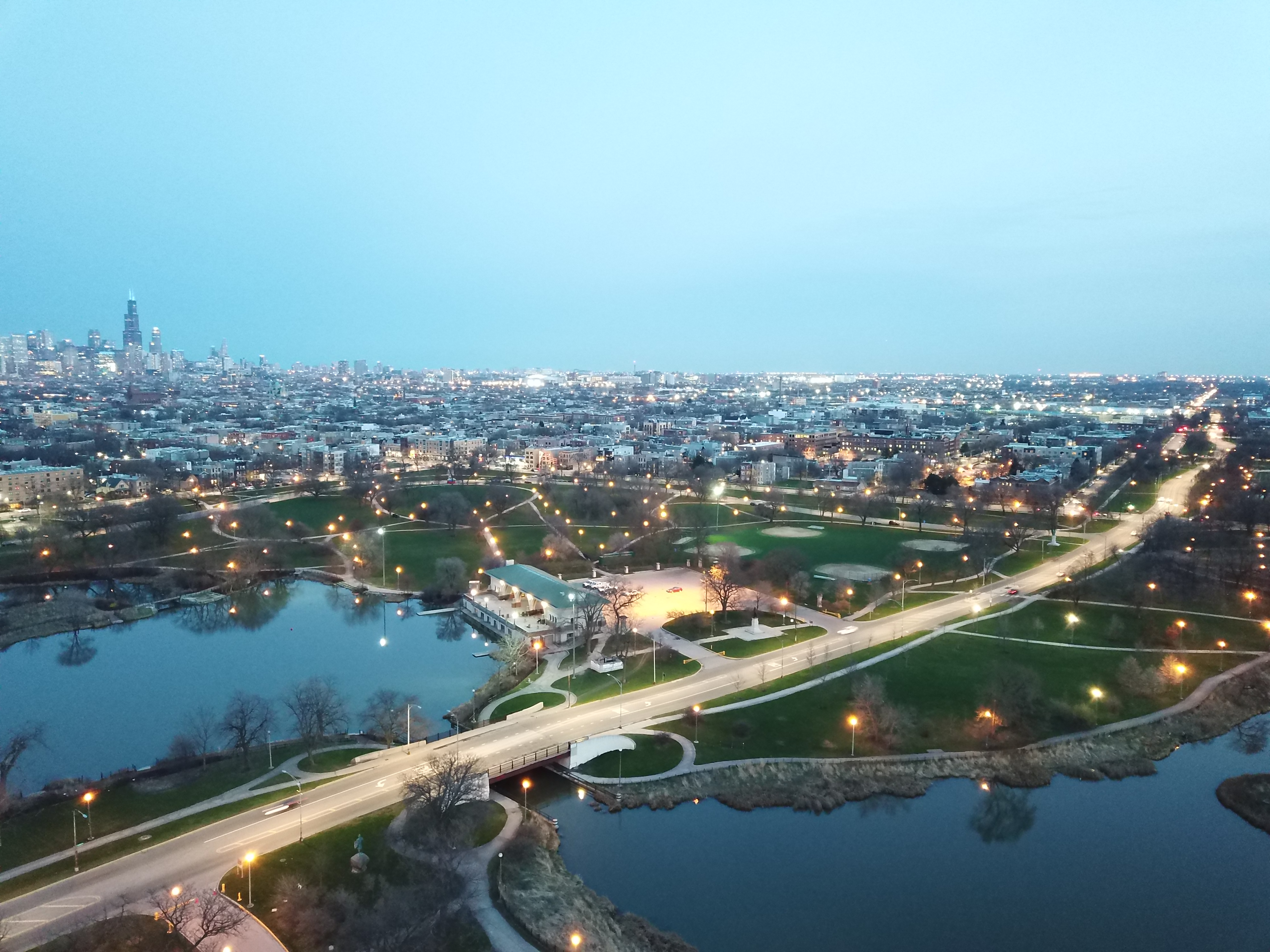
- Aerial photo of Humboldt Park's Boat House
- Interactive map of Humboldt Park
- Location: Roughly bounded by N. Sacramento and Augusta Blvds., and N. Kedzie, North and N. California Aves. and W. Division St., Chicago, Illinois
- Coordinates: 41.906°N 87.702°W
- Area: 206.9 acres (0.837 km^{2})
- Created: 1870s–1920s
- Humboldt Park
- U.S. National Register of Historic Places
- U.S. Historic district
- Chicago Landmark
- MPS: Chicago Park District MPS
- NRHP reference No.: 92000074

Significant dates
- Added to NRHP: February 20, 1992
- Designated CHICL: November 13, 1996 and February 6, 2008

Humboldt Park is an 207-acre (84 ha) urban park located at 1400 North Sacramento Avenue in West Town, on the West Side of Chicago, Illinois. To its west is the neighborhood named after it, also called Humboldt Park. It opened in 1877, and is one of the largest parks on the West Side. The park's designers include William Le Baron Jenney, and Jens Jensen.

The park was named for Alexander von Humboldt, a German naturalist and botanist.

== History ==
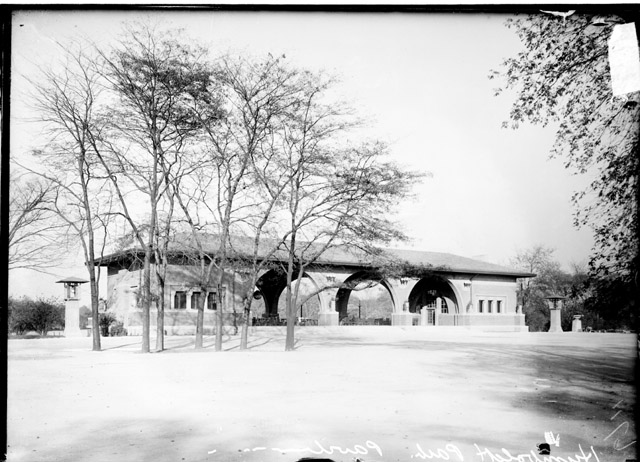
Pavilion in 1908

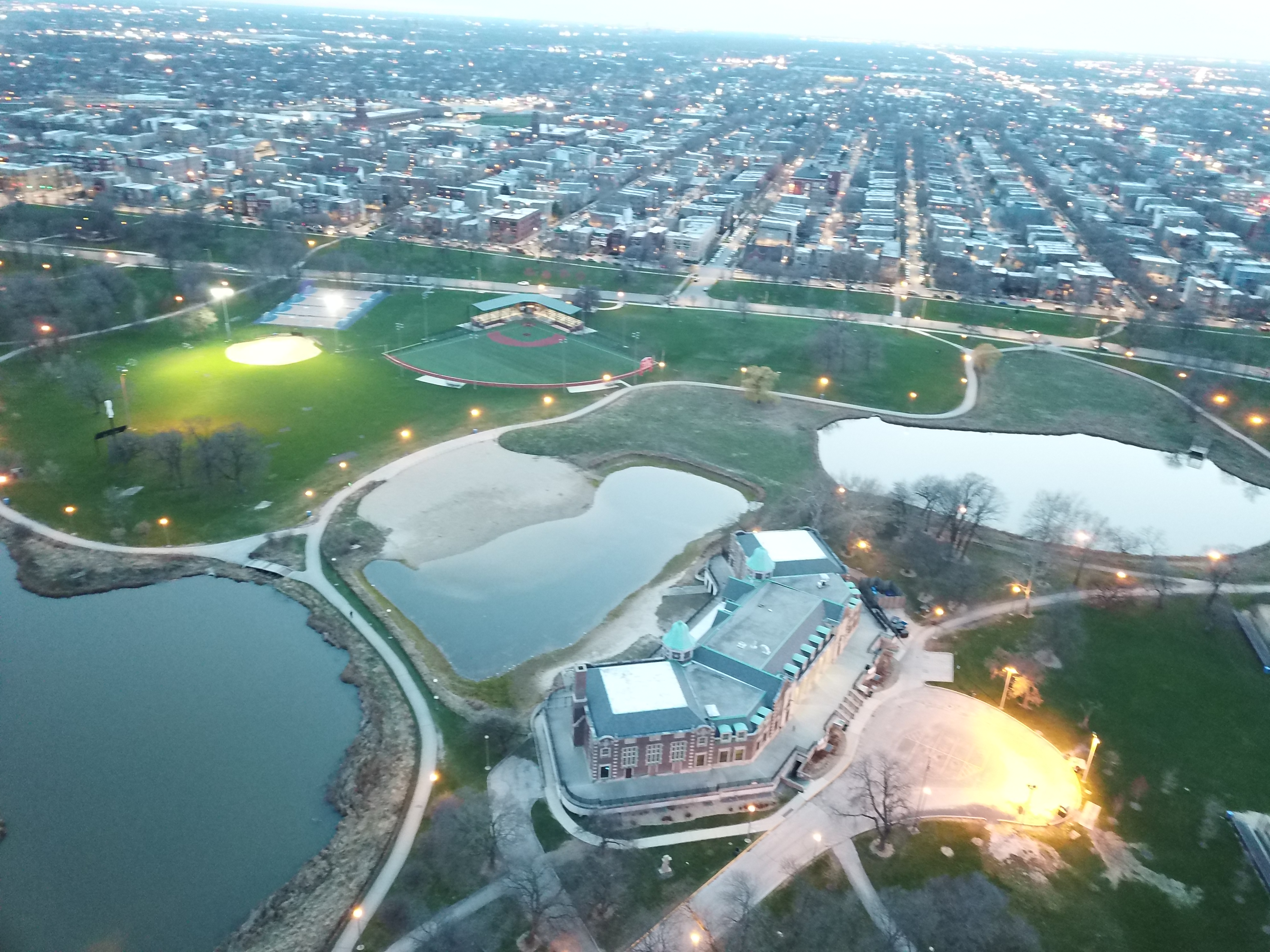
Aerial photo of the Field House and Refectory

William Le Baron Jenney began developing the park in the 1870s, molding a flat prairie landscape into a "pleasure ground" with horse trails and a pair of lagoons. Originally named "North Park", it opened to the public in 1877, but landscape architects such as Jens Jensen made significant additions to the park over the next few decades. Between 1905 and 1920, Jensen connected the two lagoons with a river, planted a rose garden, and built a fieldhouse, boathouse, and music pavilion.

In 2018, the Chicago Park District and Chicago Parks Foundation partnered with the Garden Conservancy organization to improve the Jens Jensen Formal Garden. They rehabilitated the natural landscape and repaired deteriorating infrastructure, winning the 2018 Jens Jensen Award from the Illinois chapter of the American Society of Landscape Architects.

The park played a prominent role in the past for Chicago's Polish community. The Polish Constitution Day Parade once traditionally terminated here at the Tadeusz Kosciuszko statue that was located here before it was moved to the Solidarity Promenade on the lakefront Museum Campus in 1981. Additionally, pianist and Polish statesman Ignace Paderewski delivered a famous address where he rallied Chicagoans to the cause of a free and independent Poland.

From 2012 to 2014, Humboldt Park was the home of the punk rock–based music festival Riot Fest and Carnival. For 2015, the three-day music festival was met with opposition from Alderman Roberto Maldonado and local residents over the condition of the grass, lack of accessibility during and after the festival, and gentrification of the surrounding area. This led to the festival's relocation south to Douglass Park.

In 2019, an alligator (a non-native species to the Midwest) was found at the park's lagoon, capturing much interest and media attention.

=== Landmark status ===
The park was added to the National Register of Historic Places in 1992. The boathouse pavilion was named a Chicago Landmark on November 13, 1996. The stables and receptory became a Chicago Landmark on February 6, 2008.

== Stable and receptory ==
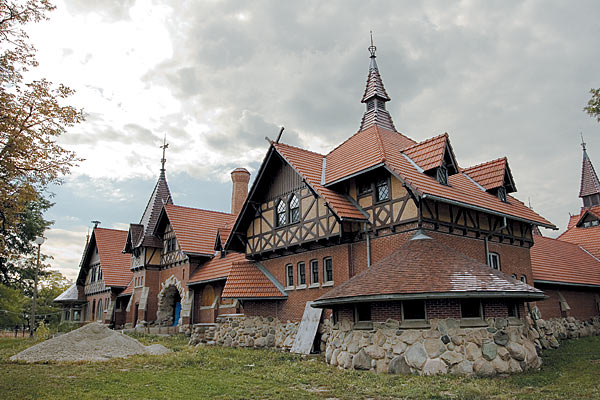
The stable and receptory

The stable and receptory is a single building. It was built in 1895–1896 as a half-timbered German country house that combined Queen Anne revival features. The eclectic architecture also incorporated some neo-medieval and neo-romanesque details, like turrets and a Richardsonian courtyard porte-cochere.

The Receptory was the visitor center and main building of the park. It included the park superintendent's office, first occupied by Jens Jensen. Visitors would park their carriages there.

The rear portion of the building was the stable, with stalls for 16 horses. It is less ornate, but still features many roof dormers and a spire.

=== Museum ===
Chicago's Puerto Rican community leased the remodeled former receptory and stables – near Paseo Boricua – to house the National Museum of Puerto Rican Arts and Culture, which opened in 2009.

== Statues ==
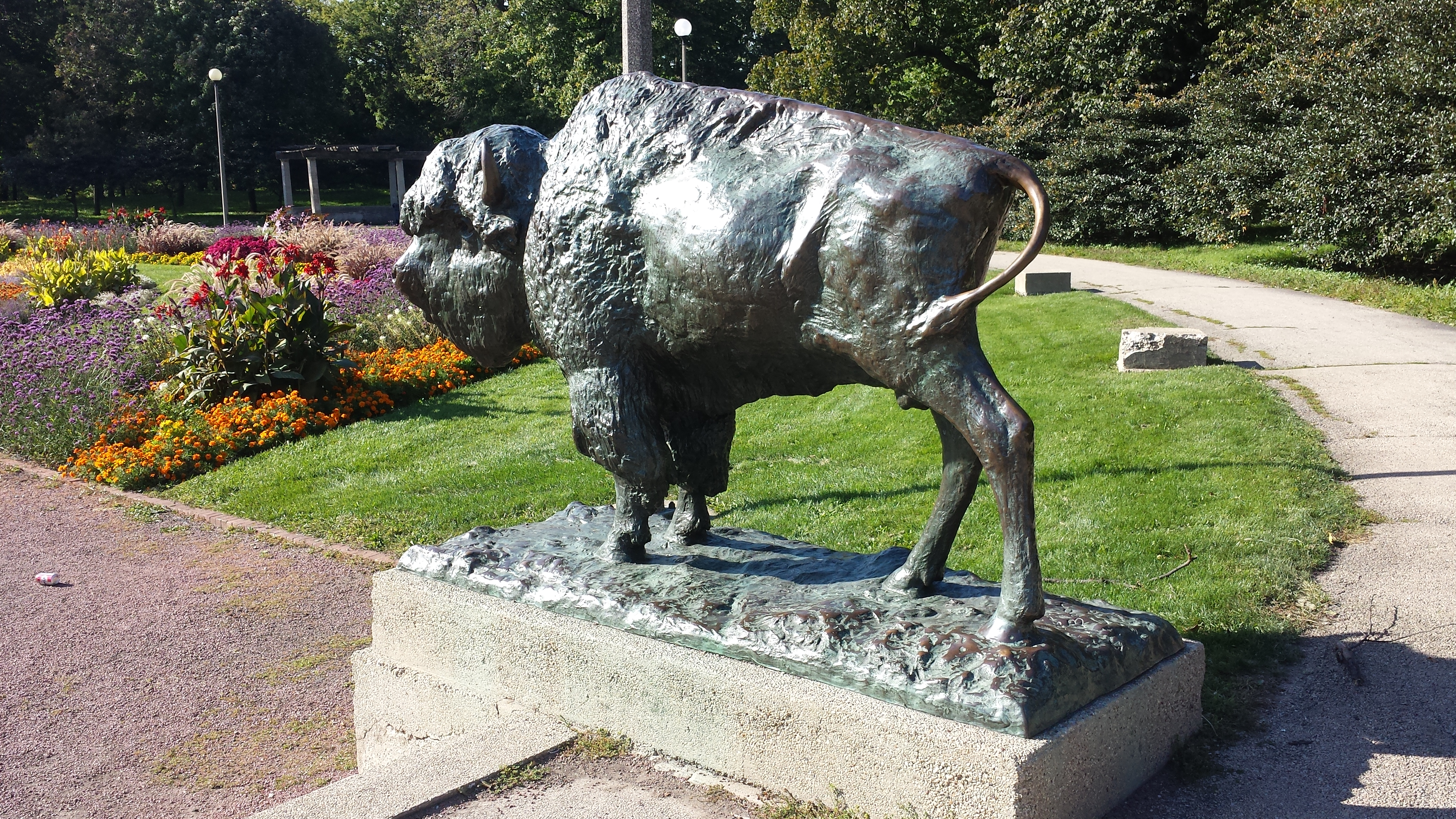
Bison bronze sculpture, Formal Garden's east entrance

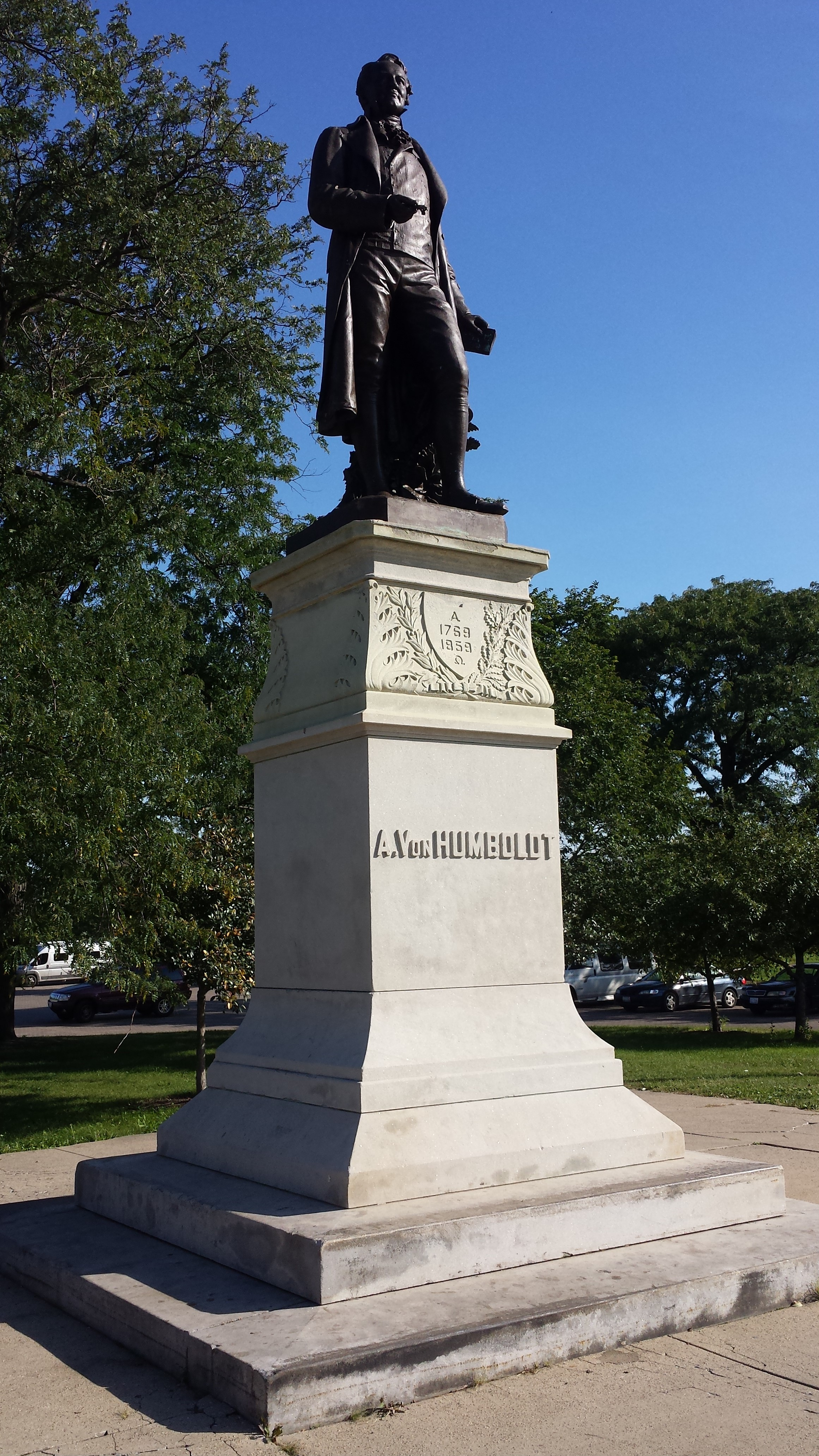
Statue of Alexander von Humboldt in the park

- Near the boathouse stands a ten-foot-tall statue of Alexander von Humboldt. Sculpted by Felix Gorling and donated by Francis Dewes, the statue encompasses a globe, a twig in his right hand, a lizard atop a manuscript, and plants at his feet. These inclusions were to symbolize Humboldt's travels and role in establishing geophysics and physical geography sciences.
- At the east entrance to the park, a pair of bronze American bison face the gardens. The sculptor, Edward Kemeys, also known for the lions at the entrance of the Art Institute of Chicago, created the Bison for the 1893 World's Columbian Exposition. The bronze reproductions of the Bison were created by Jules Bercham. They were placed in Humboldt Park's formal garden since 1915.
- German American residents of Chicago commissioned to have a monument created of Fritz Reuter, a German novelist and political martyr and located it in the park. The German American sculptor for this monument, Franz Engelsman had also originally created four relief plaques depicting Reuter's achievements that were placed at the base of the sculpture. However, they were stolen in the 1930s and never salvaged.
- The Statue of Leif Erikson is a bronze Viking sculpture set atop a granite boulder in Humboldt Park. Some believe Erikson to be the first European to discover North America. The Norwegian American community of Chicago commissioned the monument, which was sculpted by the Norwegian artist Sigvald Asbjørnsen.

Additionally, the park was once home to the Tadeusz Kościuszko Monument by Kazimierz Chodzinski that was built thanks to funds raised by Chicago's Polish community and moved in 1981 to the city's lakefront.
