= Osvaldo Budet =

Puerto Rican artist

- Born: Juan Osvaldo Budet Meléndez; 14 June 1979 (age 47); San Juan, Puerto Rico
- Education: Escuela de Artes Plásticas de Puerto Rico, Maryland Institute College of Art
- Website: http://www.osvaldobudet.com

Osvaldo Budet (Juan Osvaldo Budet-Meléndez; born 1979 in San Juan, Puerto Rico) is a contemporary Puerto Rican artist. He is currently based in San Juan, Puerto Rico.

== Education ==
Budet received a B.F.A. in painting in 2004 from Escuela de Artes Plásticas de Puerto Rico and an M.F.A. in Painting from the Hoffberger School of Painting in 2008 at Maryland Institute College of Art (MICA). He was an artist in resident at Museo del Barrio Santurce, Puerto Rico in 2005 and in the Leipzig International Art Program, Germany in 2008.

== Work ==
Budet's work is influenced by documentary film, and activism. His production of paintings, photographs and videos are characterized as being both "humorous and seriousness". The work displays a conscious of the problems of identity; a notion of the colonized is at the center of this work.

Budet constructs paintings and photographs which use self-portraiture to explore historical moments, often citing the creation of colonial identity. Budet uses reflective materials, such as diamond dust, iron oxide and glass to reference the material of film. His work has been shown in Puerto Rico, New York City, Chicago, Los Angeles, Miami, Baltimore, Washington, D.C., Ireland and Italy.
