= Humboldt Park, Chicago =

Community area in Chicago, Illinois

Humboldt Park
- Community area
- Community Area 23 – Humboldt Park
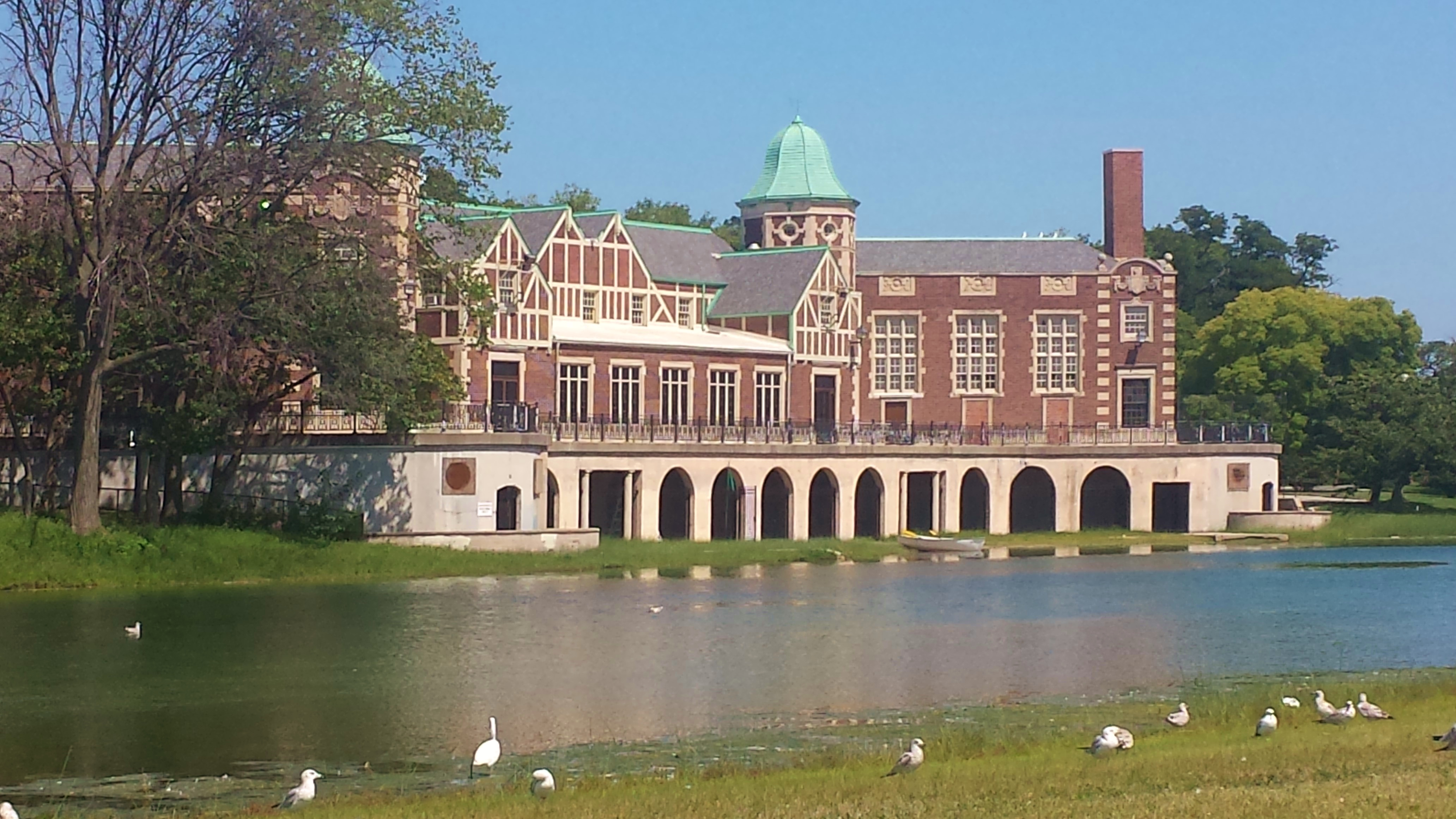
- The Humboldt Park Field House and Refectory in 2014.

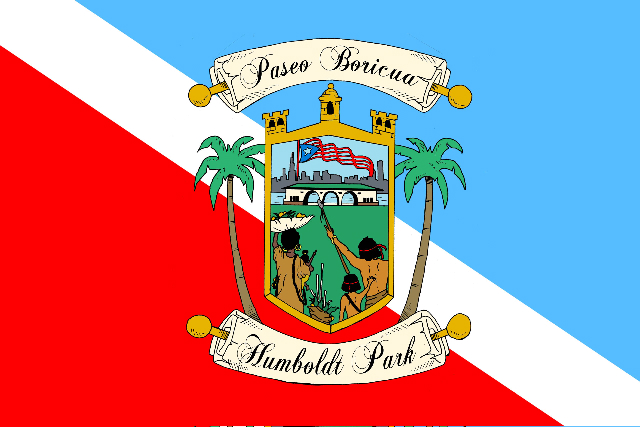
- Flag

- Location within the city of Chicago
- Coordinates: 41°52.8′N 87°42′W
- Country: United States
- State: Illinois
- County: Cook
- City: Chicago
- Named for: Humboldt Park
- Neighborhoods: List: Humboldt Park; West Humboldt Park

Area
  - Total: 3.60 sq mi (9.32 km^{2})

Population (2024)
  - Total: 56,153
  - Density: 15,600/sq mi (6,020/km^{2})

Demographics 2024
  - White: 12.1%
  - Black: 30.2%
  - Hispanic: 53.8%
  - Asian: 2.2%
  - Other: 1.8%
- Time zone: UTC-6 (CST)
  - Summer (DST): UTC-5 (CDT)
- ZIP Codes: parts of 60612, 60622, 60624, 60639, 60647, and 60651.

Humboldt Park is one of the 77 community areas of Chicago in Illinois, United States, located on the West Side of Chicago. The Humboldt Park neighborhood is known for its dynamic social and ethnic demographic change over the years. The Puerto Rican community has identified strongly with the area since the 1970s. Humboldt Park is also the name of the Chicago Park District's historic 207-acre (0.8 km^{2}) park or public garden adjacent to the community area.

== Boundaries and subsections ==
The official community boundaries established by the City of Chicago include Bloomingdale Ave to the north, the Union Pacific railroad tracks to the south, the train tracks running between Kostner and Cicero to the west, and Humboldt Park proper to the east (to the East side of California Ave).

In contrast to the Humboldt Park Official Community Area, the Humboldt Park Neighborhood's borders include Western Avenue to the east, Pulaski Road to the west, North Avenue to the North, and the Union Pacific tracks to the south. The railyards southeast of Grand and Sacramento are also part of the community area. There are two distinct areas of Humboldt Park (the neighborhood): East Humboldt Park (In the West Town Community Area) and West Humboldt Park (In the Humboldt Park Community Area), divided by Sacramento Boulevard.

=== East Humboldt Park/West Town ===
East Humboldt Park is bordered by Sacramento Boulevard, Western Avenue, North Avenue and Division Street. Though it is considered a part of the Humboldt Park neighborhood, it is officially a part of the West Town community area. The area has been known for its working and lower middle class Puerto Rican community from the 1970s to the 2000s. The area has seen a large influx of White middle to upper middle class residents due to the process of gentrification, though parts of the neighborhood are still impoverished and still is known for high crime and gang activity. The area once had the largest middle class Puerto Rican community in the Midwest.

The area is home to many social service institutions, bars, restaurants, cafes and shops as well as two sixty-foot Puerto Rican flags on a stretch of Division Street designated Paseo Boricua. In 2013, Mayor Rahm Emanuel's sweeping school closings closed Von Humboldt Elementary, De Duprey Elementary, and Lafayette Elementary, leaving no neighborhood elementary schools in the area. Following the closures, the remaining neighborhood elementary attendance boundaries for the area were absorbed by nearby schools, including José De Diego Community Academy and Bernhard Moos Elementary School.

=== West Humboldt Park ===
West Humboldt Park is the area west of Sacramento Boulevard. Many residents on this side of Humboldt Park are low-income working class residents. Though in conventional terms the Humboldt Park neighborhood has been considered between Western Avenue, Pulaski Road, North Avenue, and Chicago Avenue. The area west of Pulaski until Kenton Avenue is considered West Humboldt Park as well.

=== K-Town ===
K-Town is a nickname for an area in Humboldt Park, North Lawndale, and West Garfield Park (Note: Although these long streets extend beyond the bounds of North Lawndale, and West Garfield Park, published sources identify the name K-Town as referring specifically to an area of North Lawndale, and West Garfield Park, i.e. the area through which these streets pass.) between Pulaski Road and Cicero Avenue in which the names of many north–south avenues begin with the letter K (Keystone, Karlov, Kedvale, Keeler, Kenneth, Kilbourn, Kildare, Kolin, Kolmar, Komensky, Kostner, Kilpatrick, Kenton, Knox, and Keating). The pattern is a historical relic of a 1913 street-naming proposal, by which streets were to be systematically named according to their distance from the Illinois-Indiana border. K, the eleventh letter, was to be assigned to streets within the eleventh mile, counting west from the state line.

The eleventh mile is the easternmost area in which the plan was widely implemented, as many neighborhoods to the east were already developed and had street names in place. The portion of K-Town bounded by W. Cullerton St, W. Cermak Rd, S. Kostner Ave, and S. Pulaski Rd was listed as a historic district on the National Register of Historic Places on September 9, 2010.

== History ==
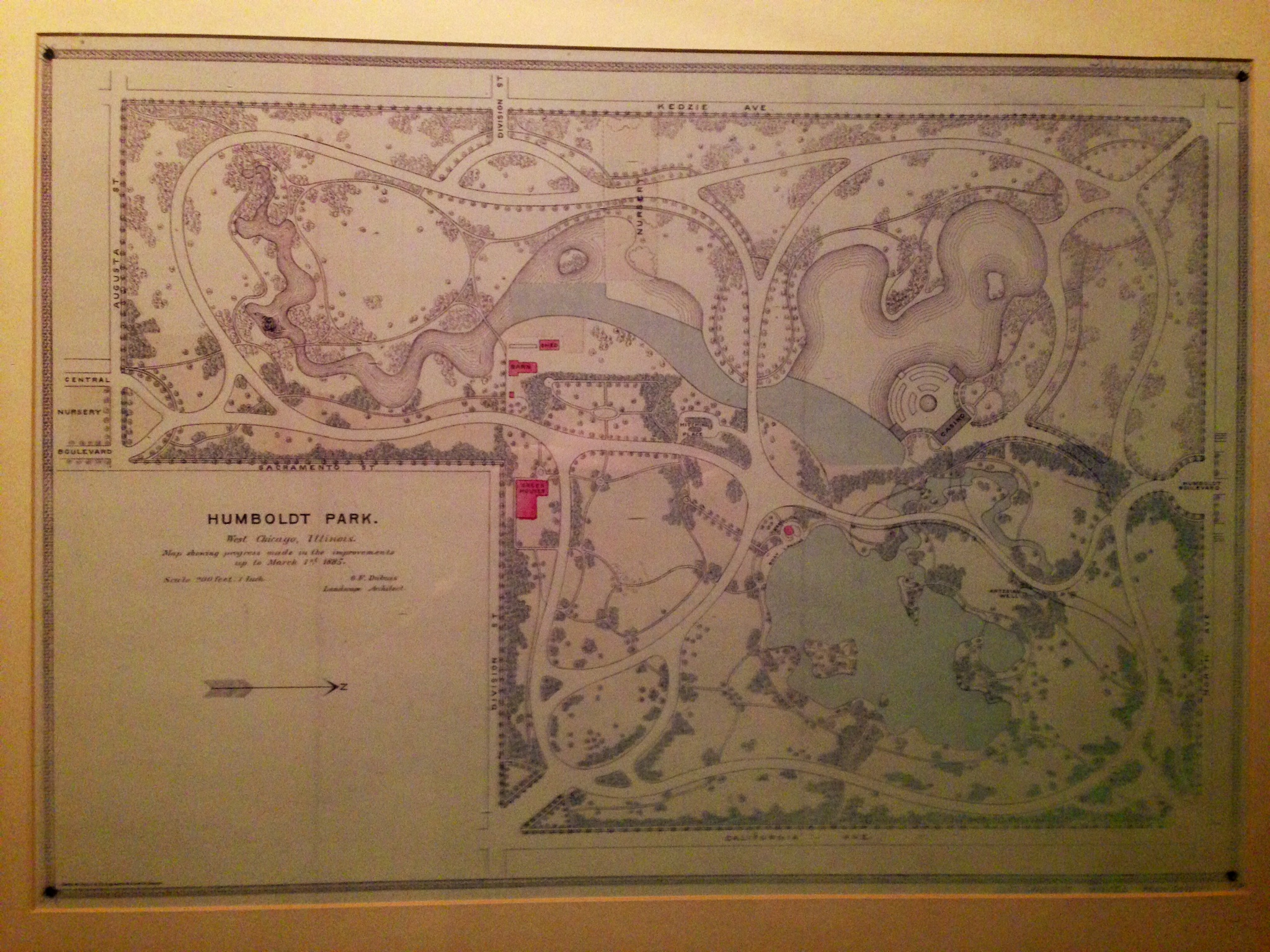
A map of Humboldt Park showing progress made in improvements up to 1885

The park was named for Alexander von Humboldt (1769–1859), a German naturalist and geographer, known as the "Father of Environmentalism" and as an early observer of human-induced climate change, was famed for his five-volume work Cosmos: Draft of a Physical Description of the World. His single visit to the United States in 1804 did not include Chicago, but citizens sponsored his monumental statue, unveiled in October 1892. Humboldt Park is part of Chicago's Boulevard Park System, which flanks the Loop with large parks linked with boulevards.

The park is lined with graystone houses and is no longer subject to landmark status restrictions on Kedzie Ave. The park itself has 3 major historical public buildings, including the Boat House (designed by Schmidt, Garden and Martin), the Field House (which received a 1.5 million dollar renovation grant, being implemented in 2013) and the Historic Stables (described more below).

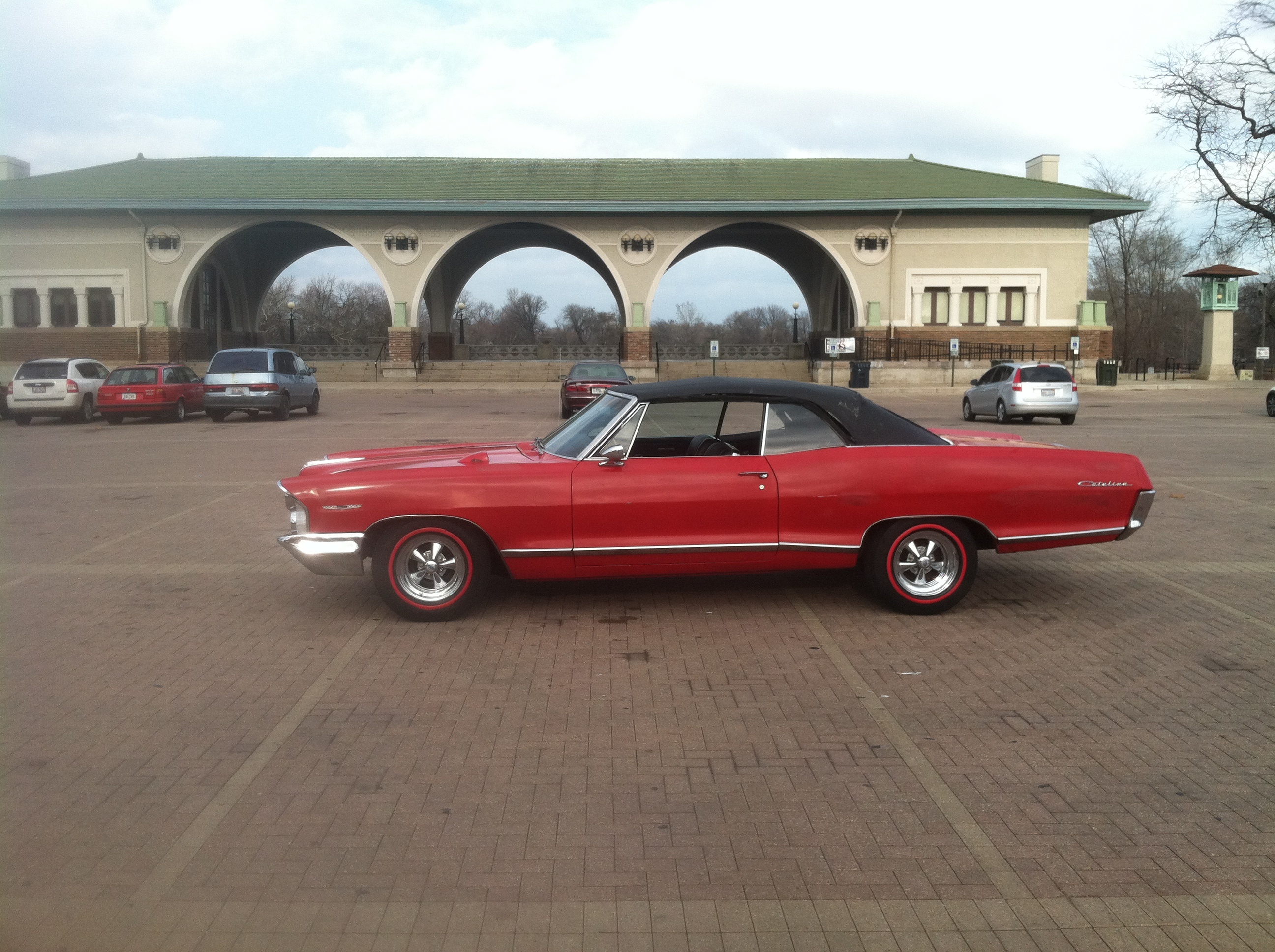
Humboldt Park Boathouse (1907) Schmidt, Garden & Martin (detail from community car show)

Chicago annexed most of the neighborhood in 1869, the year the park was laid out. Because the area lay just beyond the city's fire code jurisdiction, as set out after the 1871 fire, this made low cost construction possible.

The neighborhood has been a center for many ethnic groups since Chicago's inception:

1. Scandinavians (especially Norwegian and Danish, but also Swedish)
2. European Jews (approximately 1/4 of the community with a peak of 30,000 in the 1930s), Germans and Italians
3. Polish
4. Puerto Ricans, Cubans, African Americans, Mexicans, and other Latinos

The currently abandoned Pioneer Trust and Savings Bank Building at the intersection of N. Pulaski/North Avenue was at one point one of the United States 300 largest commercial banks. In 1895, streetcars began operating along North Avenue, once a bustling commercial hub, and would travel west down towards Pulaski. In 1911, streetcars began running on Pulaski itself, making this intersection in particular a nucleus of activity.

=== Our Lady of the Angels School fire ===
Our Lady of the Angels School Fire occurred at the Our Lady of the Angels School on December 1, 1958, on 909 North Avers Avenue in the Humboldt Park area. The school, which was operated by the Roman Catholic Archdiocese of Chicago, lost 92 students and three nuns in five classrooms on the second floor.

=== Recent history ===
In 1980, Puerto Ricans were the largest ethnic group in Humboldt Park, with a majority in 42 census tracts in the Humboldt Park area. In 2009 Puerto Ricans were the largest ethnic presence in 11 census tracts in the Humboldt Park area.

In the 1970s, Humboldt Park became more dangerous with high levels of gang activity, crime, and violence. The neighborhood was economically depressed, with housing values below the citywide average, until the recent upswing. Overcrowding remains a serious problem, as does gang activity and violent crime. Gentrification, beginning in the late 1990s, along with changing police tactics, and cultural, political and social organizations, have changed the demographics, politics, economy and rates of the area.

Research indicates that as communities experience gentrification, new and more affluent residents push out legacy residents through higher property taxes, and interpersonal divestment in contributing to the culture of the neighborhood. New and more affluent residents in Humboldt Park prioritize community concerns. The previous poorer and non-White residents are often criminalized by these new residents who increasingly use law enforcement agencies.

According to the Woodstock institute, 550 foreclosures in Humboldt Park during 2010 further decreased the Puerto Rican presence. Newer middle-class and wealthy White people, as well as working class Mexican people have shifted the Puerto Rican majority in Humboldt Park. Some Puerto Ricans that are upwardly mobile have left Humboldt Park, while others dispersed due to economic difficulty throughout the city, especially into the neighborhoods of Belmont Cragin, Hermosa, and Portage Park. Many have dispersed throughout Cook County.

In June 2024, the part of the Humboldt Park neighborhood in Chicago known as Puerto Rico Town or Paseo Boricua officially changed its name to Barrio Borikén.

=== Gang History ===
Humboldt Park is the founding grounds for several major gangs, including the Latin Kings, Maniac Latin Disciples, and Simon City Royals, among a number of other gangs with active chapters in the area. Many of these gangs were originally formed along racial lines, largely in the face of discrimination and tension, such as between Puerto Ricans and white greaser gangs around the area. Violence between these groups would lead to the formation of the Latin Kings in 1954. The Division Street Riots in 1966 would be yet another formative event in the organization of various groups around the neighborhood.

The gang culture that brewed in the neighborhood during the 1950s and 1960s carried on for successive generations. The 1970s was a particularly tumultuous decade in Chicago for violent crime, and against Chicago Police officers who faced some of the highest fatality rates in many decades, often as a result of gunfire. The center stage for much of this crime, frequently stemming from gang activity and drug dealing, would be Humboldt Park. By the late 1980s/early 90s, approximately 49 of the 139 gangs in Chicago operated out of the neighborhood. Eventually in the 1990s, the east side of the neighborhood began experiencing some gentrification, and crime gradually lowered around this area with the 2010s seeing notably lowered violent crime levels. However, crime has been a concern for some residents of the area as recently as 2023. Members have been known to actively gangbang in or around the park, such as a group of 13 who maintained an open-air market where they openly sold crack and fentanyl-laced drugs. In 2023, Humboldt Park residents held several rallies protesting continued issues surrounding drug dealing and violent crimes, such as armed robberies and shootings.

== Demographics ==
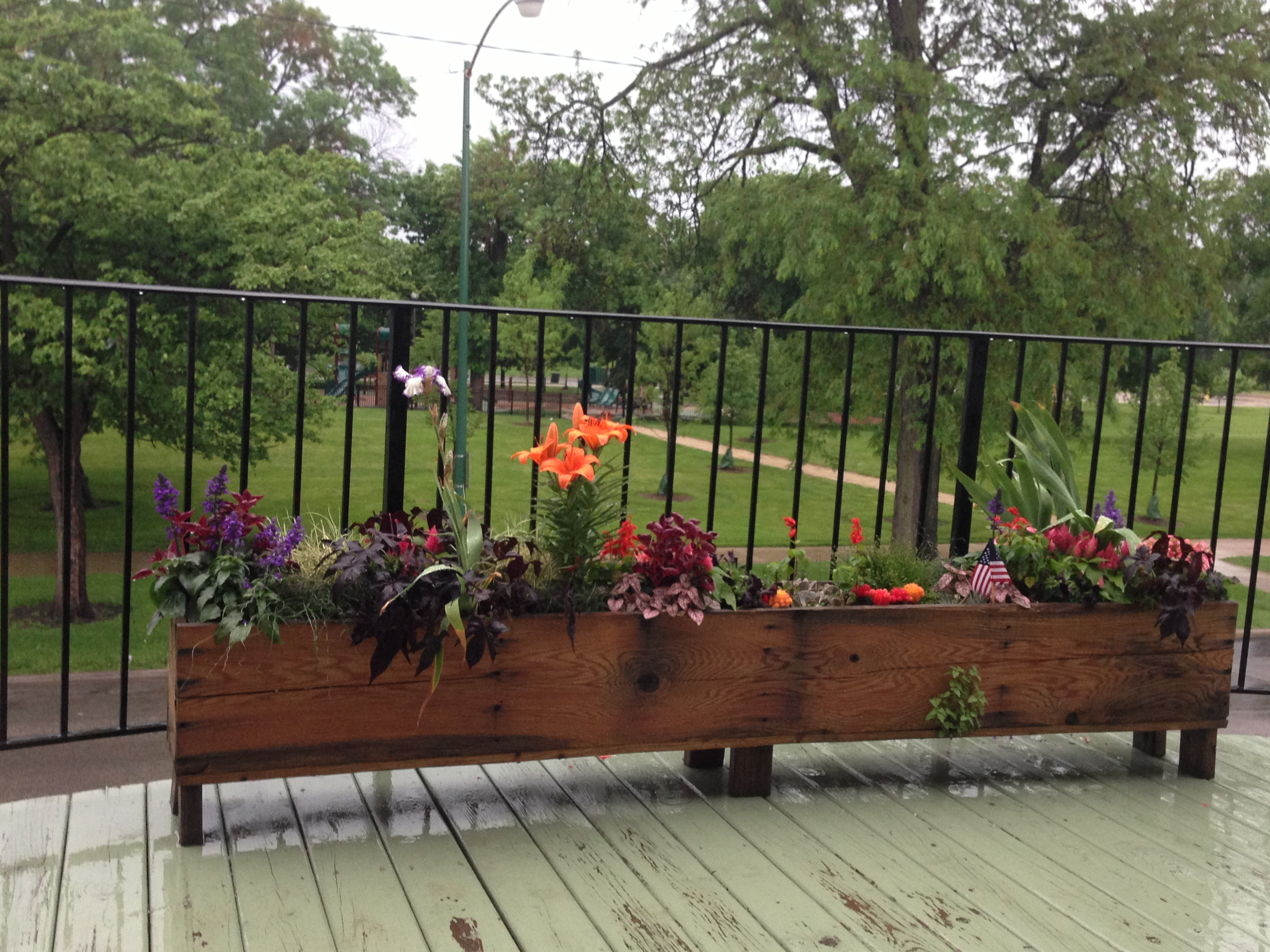
View, from parkside residence, of Humboldt Park

As of February 2013, the 26th Ward of the City of Chicago (which encompasses the majority of Humboldt Park) had a population of 28.0% Puerto Ricans. East of Humboldt Park, which is West Town part of the First Ward, is now 45.12% White due to the larger amount of gentrification factors on the east side of the park. Increasing property taxes during the past two decades have forced out the Latino and Eastern European residents that live east of the park.

This shift can be easily seen moving westward towards Kedzie Avenue past Humboldt Park and the reduced coverage and visibility of the Puerto Rican Day Parade. Consistent price increases in neighboring have out-priced gentrifiers in surrounding neighborhoods, sending them to Humboldt Park, displacing residents whom they had already displaced in the previous neighborhoods.

The area around Our Lady of the Angels Church was majority Irish American in the late 1800s. At some point many ethnic Irish moved to suburban municipalities, and in the 1950s, these sections of were characterized by the Italian American community. Some Irish Americans remained, and there were also Polish Americans at that time.

=== Puerto Rican community ===
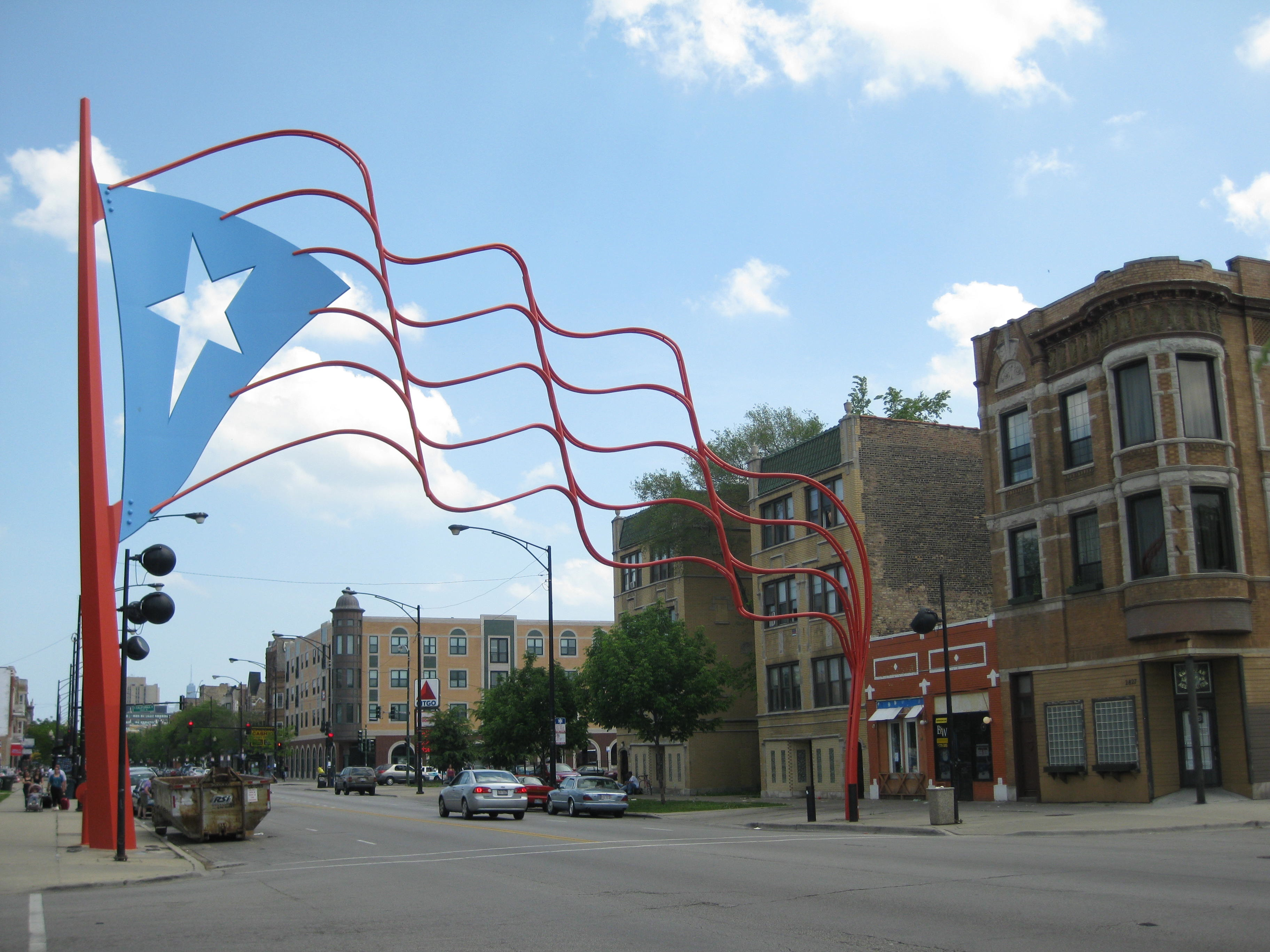
Puerto Rican metal flag at Division Street, Humboldt Park

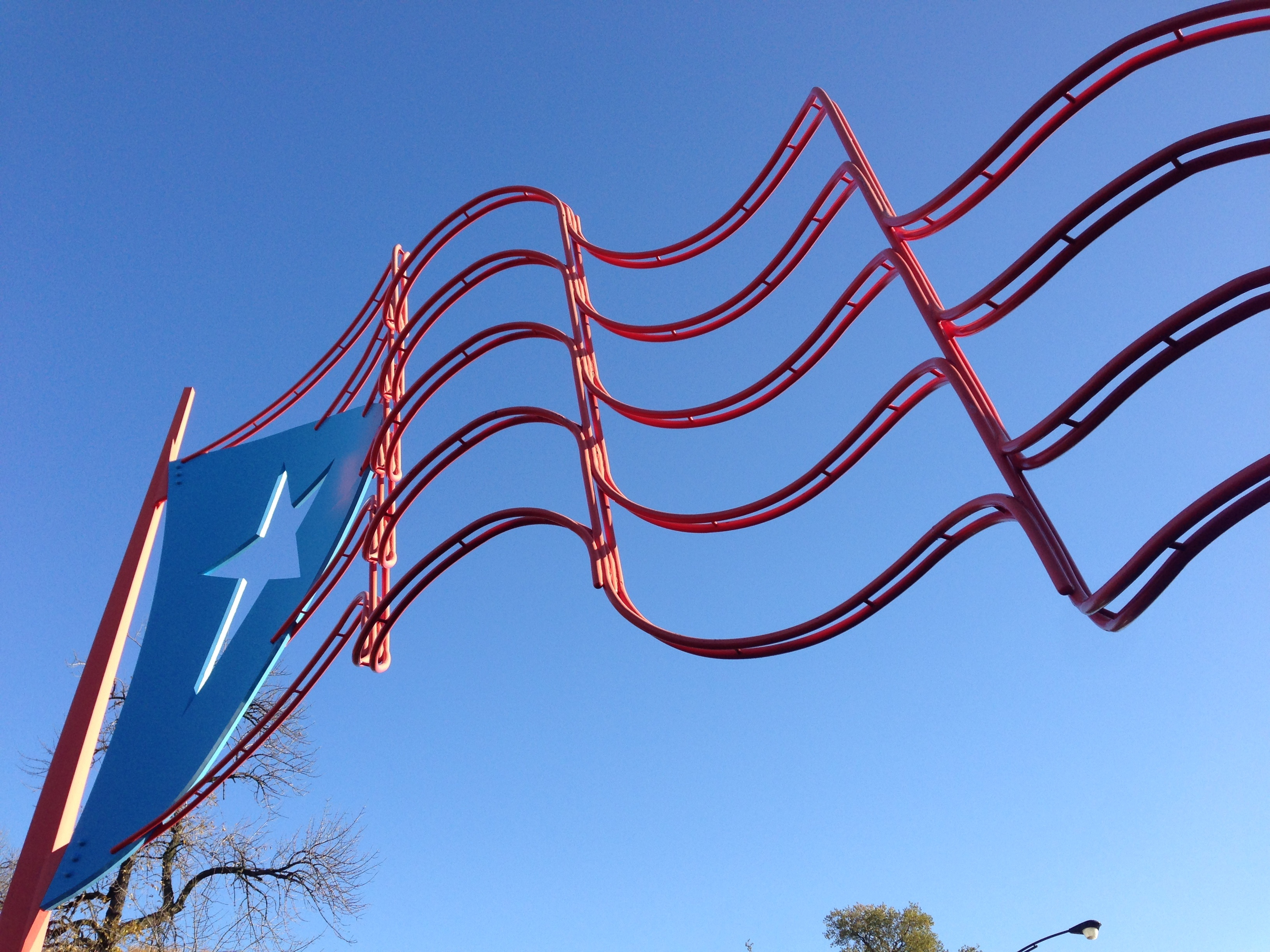
One of the two metal Puerto Rican flags at Humboldt Park

As early as the 1950s, Puerto Ricans settled in Humboldt Park. Many came directly from Puerto Rico as migration was averaging over ten thousand Puerto Ricans per year in the 1950s and 1960s, throughout the United States. Others were forced out by urban renewal from the first Puerto Rican neighborhoods of La Madison near the Eisenhower Expressway and University of Illinois, Chicago campus and from Old Town and Lincoln Park, then called La Clark.

The infamous Division Street Riots resulted in the start of organizations for Puerto Rican rights in 1966. Another smaller riot took place in Lincoln Park in 1967. The Young Lords, under the leadership of Jose Cha Cha Jimenez worked with gangs like the Latin Kings, the Spanish Cobras, the Latin Disciples and the above-mentioned community organizations to build unity and to redirect youth energies toward education and empowerment strategies.

To the Young Lords, it was one community and they organized several solidarity marches from Lincoln Park to Humboldt Park and to City Hall, demanding social services, an end to police brutality and an end to neighborhood displacement. The last point refers especially to the Puerto Rican community's (socio-economic-culturally forced) migration West in the city from Lincoln Park.

In 1995, city officials and Puerto Rican-American activists in a symbolic gesture to recognize the neighborhood and the Puerto Rican residents' roots, christened a stretch of Division Street "Paseo Boricua". Two metal 59 feet (18 m)-tall Puerto Rican flags, each weighing 45 tons, arch over the street at each end of the strip. There is a proud historical and ongoing imprint of Puerto Rican identity in Humboldt Park.

==== Fiestas Puertorriqueñas and The People's Parade on Division Street ====
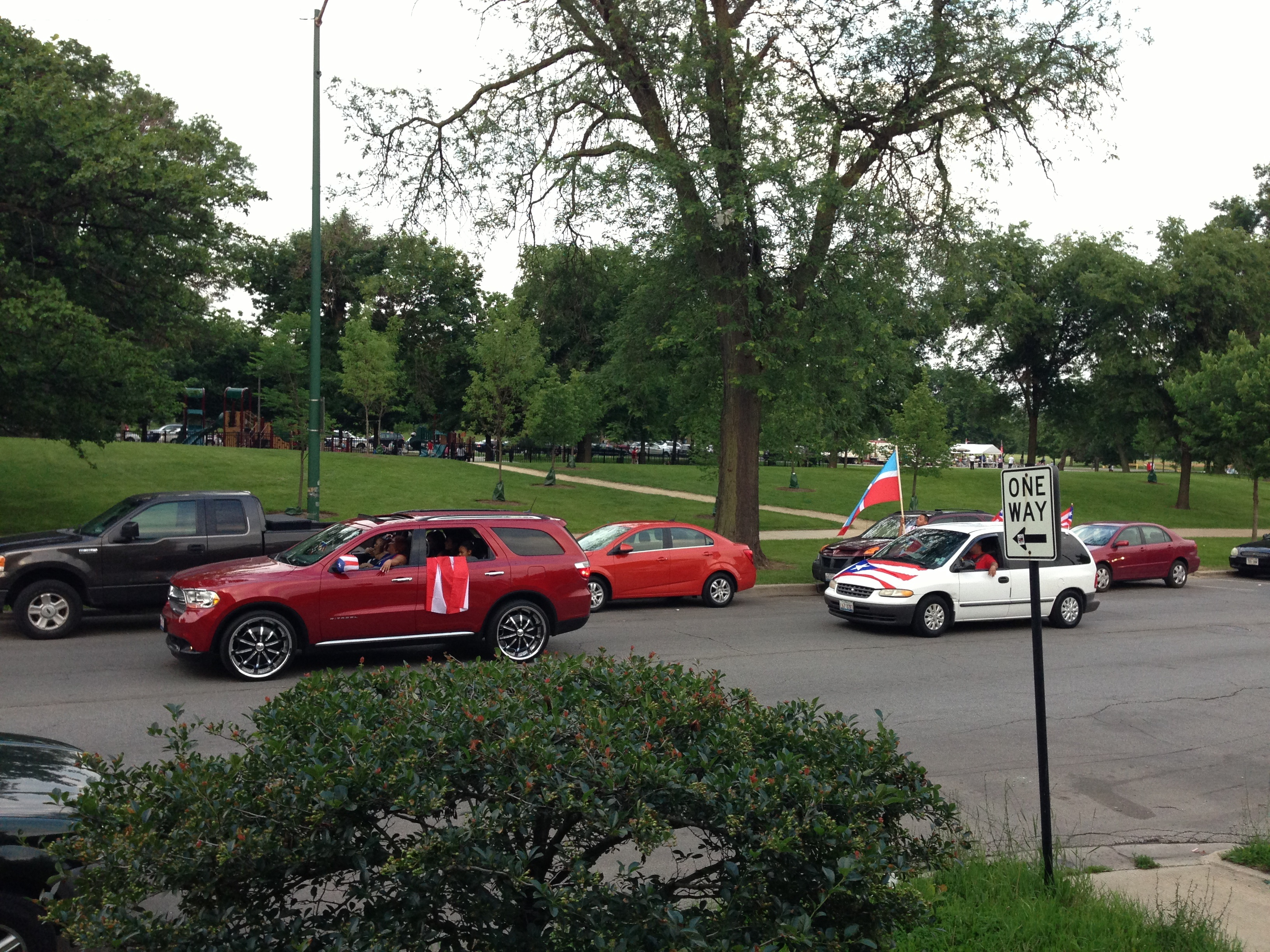
Fiestas Puertorriquenas celebrating next to historic 204 acre Humboldt Park.

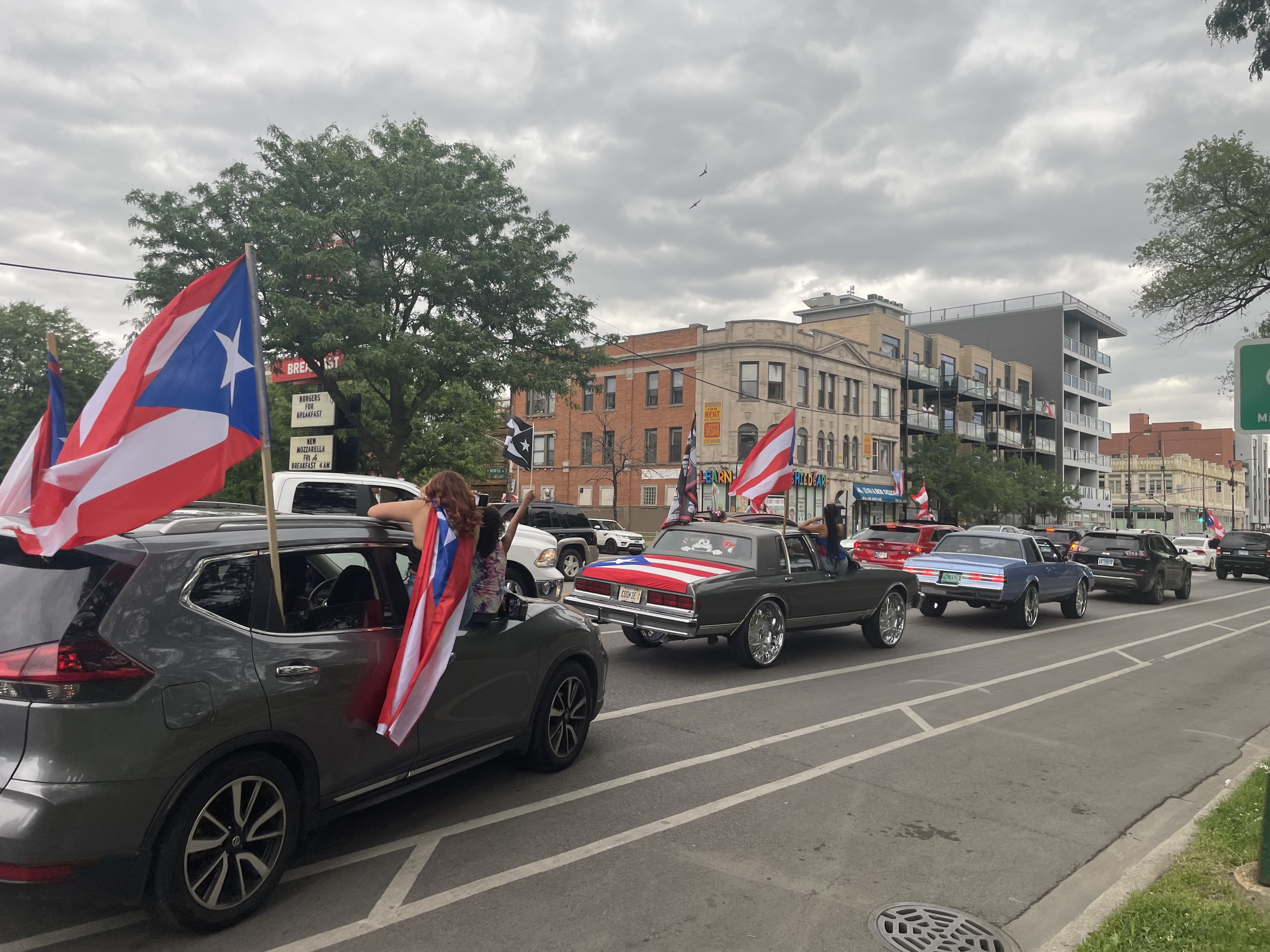
People's Puerto Rican Day Parade in full swing along North avenue, adjacent to the park

Every summer, there is the tradition of Fiestas Puertorriquenas in Humboldt Park (the park itself, as well as the neighborhood). The parade, named The People's Parade, takes place along Division Street between Western Avenue and California Avenue. The park is transformed into a party, replete with top live performers of salsa, merengue, bomba, plena, reggaeton (and its relative, hip-hop espanol) and other Puerto Rican and related Afro-Caribbean music (e.g. Dominican-based Bachata; Cuban Son, Son-Montuno, Rumba).

There is a carnival with amusement rides and Puerto Rican food: arroz con gandules, pollo guisado, pinchos, mofongo, and alcapurrias (just to name a few of the foods). Vendor booths purvey the food as well as deejays playing traditional and new Chicago house music with Spanish vocals and soulful (often orchestral Latin-jazz laden) Afro-Caribbean syncopated rhythms. In 2021, the festival celebrated the 40th anniversary of Boricua en la luna, a poem written by Juan Antonio Corretjer and popularized by Roy Brown as well as the 50th anniversary of a Puerto Rican mural at the corner of North and Artesian Avenues.

== Riot Fest ==
In 2012, Riot Fest changed the location of its annual music festival to Humboldt Park. The fest expanded to become Riot Fest & Carnival, with rides, games, wrestling, gourmet food vendors and three stages. Performers included Iggy Pop And The Stooges, Rise Against, Elvis Costello & The Imposters, The Offspring, and many more. In 2013, attendance at increased, with a peak of 30,000 people on the first day. and additional festivals were held in Toronto and Denver.

In 2014, 160,000 people attended Riot Fest that had a lineup that included Jane's Addiction, Rise Against, and Slayer, The Flaming Lips, Wu-Tang Clan, The Cure, Weezer, Social Distortion, Primus, Tegan and Sara, Cheap Trick, and Patti Smith. This Riot Fest included the inaugural "Riot Fest Speaks" panel, moderated by Henry Rollins and featuring Pussy Riot members Nadya Tolokonnikova and Masha Alyokhina, Bad Religion vocalist and UCLA professor Greg Graffin, Rise Against vocalist Tim McIlrath, writer/activist Marcelle Karp, and Riot Fest founder Michael Petryshyn.

In 2015, after some members of the community protested the presence of Riot Fest as a sign of gentrification in the neighborhood (along with the prolonged closure of the park for cleanup and repair after the 2014 event), Alderman Roberto Maldonado vocally opposed allowing the event to continue using Humboldt Park. The festival ultimately relocated to North Lawndale's Douglass Park, where the community is also opposed.

== Organizations ==
=== The Greater Humboldt Park Community of Wellness ===
The Greater Humboldt Park Community of Wellness is a coalition of neighborhood organizations that all focus on improving the quality of health and awareness of health in the following areas: asthma, active lifestyles, behavioral health, diabetes, health careers, HIV/AIDS, oral health, and school health. The coalition works within the Humboldt Park community area as well as the West Town community area, and mainly focuses on the health needs of Puerto Rican, Mexican, and Black residents within the neighborhood to support low-income residents who may not have access to health services. VIDA/SIDA, a project of the Puerto Rican Cultural Center, has a major presence in the community, educating the neighborhood on sexual health and LGBTQ issues, especially within the Latino/a community.

=== East Humboldt Park Neighborhood Association (EHPNA) ===
Founded in 2007 to organize those who live East of the Park and participate in the Chicago Police Department's CAPS Beat 1423 initiatives. The foundational intents are three-fold:

1. As a way to give neighbors and relatively newer residents of the East Humboldt Park a voice, an identity, and a way to get connected with each other.
2. As an efficient way to disseminate information about the community. Usually CAPS and other Community updates.
3. As a forum where neighbors can feel free to discuss some of the issues residents in East Humboldt Park as well as neighborhood victories to celebrate.

=== Historic Humboldt Park stables and the Institute of Puerto Rican Arts and Culture ===
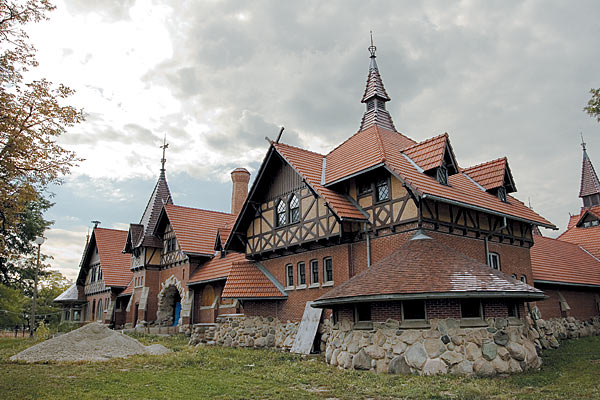
The historic Humboldt Park Stables.

Originally completed in 1895 by Chicago architects Frommann and Jebsen, the Humboldt Park Stable and Receptory is listed on the National Register of Historic Places and is a Chicago Landmark. The building's design highlights the Germanic character of the neighborhood in the 1890s and is a fanciful creation of Ludowici tile roofs, finials, brick, and half-timbering. The Institute of Puerto Rican Arts and Culture has a 15-year lease that began in May 2006 and expires in 2021.

It is dedicated to the history of Puerto Rican culture and the Puerto Rican diaspora. Funding from an ISTEA grant allowed the Chicago Park District to fully restore the building. About $3.4 million was spent to renovate the exterior of the building ($1 Million came from City of Chicago Tax Increment Finance (TIF) and another $3.2 (State of Illinois Grant) million for the interior.

The stables were once in use by a special Chicago Parks Police Force and is located at 3015 W. Division St. The turret on the Southeast corner of the building was part of the office of Jens Jensen, a landscape architect who left his mark on the impressive design of the park's natural hardscape and water features.

=== United Blocks of West Humboldt Park ===
On 5 May 1995, local West Humboldt Park residents organized to address the problems and concerns of residents and property owners living in West Humboldt Park, and as a result, incorporated The United Blocks of West Humboldt Park (TUBOWHP). The purposes for which TUBOWHP is organized are:

A.) To enhance the livability of the area by establishing and maintaining an open line of communication and liaison between the neighborhood, government agencies and other neighborhoods.

B.) To provide an open process by which all members of the neighborhood may involve themselves in the affairs of the neighborhood.

== Cultural references to the community ==
Humboldt Park figures prominently in the literary works that chronicled Chicago's blue collar life in the 1950s and 1960s.

- Saul Bellow's Adventures of Augie March charts the long drifting life of a Jewish Chicagoan and his myriad eccentric acquaintances throughout the early 20th century: growing up in the then Polish neighborhood of Humboldt Park, he ends up cavorting with heiresses on the Gold Coast, studying at the University of Chicago, fleeing union thugs in the Loop, and taking the odd detour to hang out with Trotsky in Mexico while eagle-hunting giant iguanas on horseback.
- John Guzlowski's Echoes of Tattered Tongues: Memory Unfolded chronicles the author's experiences growing up in the immigrant and DP neighborhoods around Humboldt Park in Chicago, in the context of Jewish hardware store clerks with Auschwitz tattoos on their wrists, Polish Cavalry officers who still mourned for their dead horses, and women who walked from Siberia to Iran to escape the Russians.
- John Guzlowski's detective novels "Suitcase Charlie," "Little Altar Boy," and "Murdertown" deal with crime in the refugee and immigrant neighborhood east of Humboldt Park from the 1950s through the 1970s.
- Sarah Paretsky's 1999 detective thriller Hard Time, part of the V. I. Warshawski series, is set in Humboldt Park as it was in the 1970s and 1980s, with the high levels of gang activity, crime, and violence.

Humboldt Park has also been featured in film and television.

- The Horn Blows at Midnight, a 1945 film starring Jack Benny, Margaret Dumont, and Alexis Smith, also features Humboldt Park. Benny portrays an angel sent from heaven to blow his horn at an appointed time and destroy the world. However, because the angel hasn't lived on Earth for several centuries, he becomes totally lost in modern Chicago. He floats from one misadventure to the next, including a visit to Humboldt Park during an ethnic German picnic, where he encounters Germans in traditional garb enjoying traditional German food and music. Ultimately the angel refuses to blow his horn, arguing to God that the kindness and goodness displayed by the Chicagoans he met warrants saving the world, not destroying it. God agrees.
- Nothing Like the Holidays, starring Freddy Rodriguez, John Leguizamo, Debra Messing, Alfred Molina, Jay Hernandez, Ramses Jimenez, Luis Guzman, Melonie Diaz, Vanessa Ferlito and Elizabeth Peña, follows three siblings returning to their parents' home in Humboldt Park for the holidays.
- The television series Chicago Fire is filmed on location in Chicago and has filmed several episodes in Humboldt Park. One of the characters Firefighter Joe Cruz (Joe Minoso) mentions growing up and living there, where he would be "lulled to sleep by gunfire" and has witnessed many of his childhood friends, including his own younger brother, enter a life of crime with the local ethnic gang.

== Politics ==
The Humboldt Park community area has supported the Democratic Party in the past two presidential elections. In the 2016 presidential election, Humboldt Park cast 15,723 votes for Hillary Clinton and cast 806 votes for Donald Trump (92.61% to 4.75%). In the 2012 presidential election, Humboldt Park cast 16,494 votes for Barack Obama and cast 573 votes for Mitt Romney (96.02% to 3.34%).

== Government and politics ==
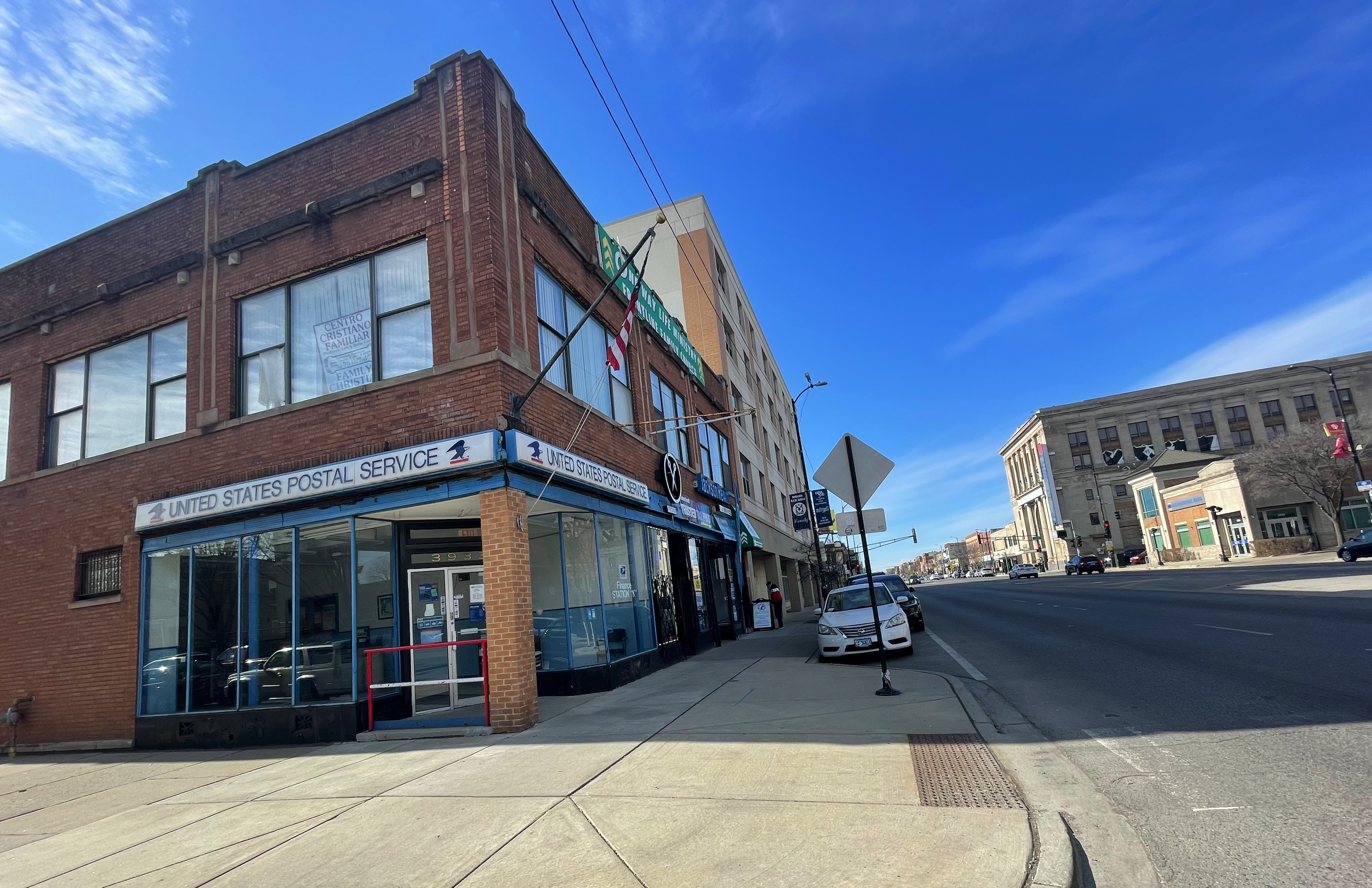
US Post Office, looking down W. North avenue.

The United States Postal Service operates Finance Station K in the community area.

== Education ==
=== Primary and secondary schools ===
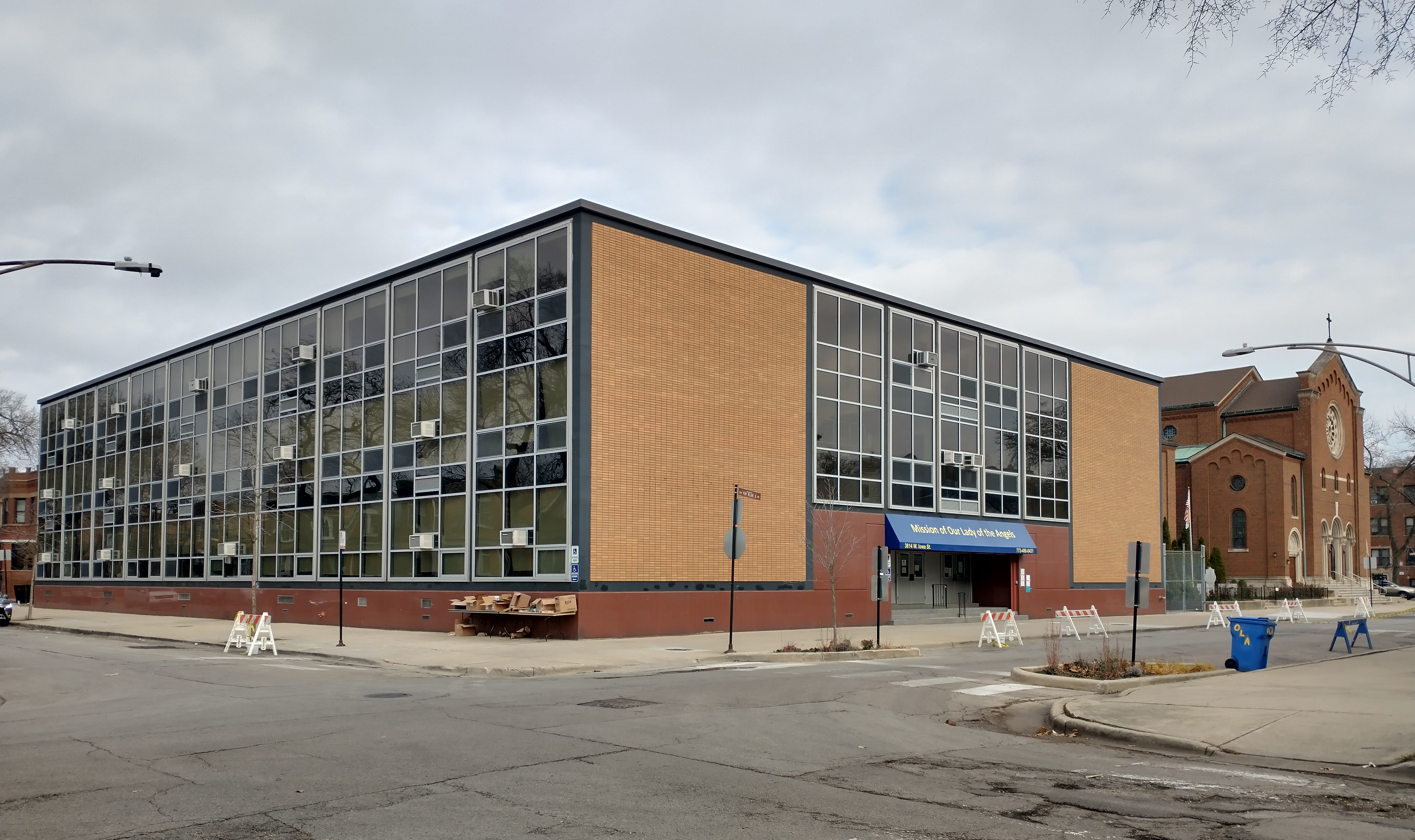
The rebuilt campus of Our Lady of the Angels School, later used as charter schools

Chicago Public Schools (CPS) operates district public schools.

Zoned K-8 schools/elementary schools serving Humboldt Park include:

- Daniel R. Cameron Elementary School
- Pablo Casals Elementary School
- James Russell Lowell Elementary School
- Morton Elementary School
- Alfred Nobel Elementary School
- Brian Piccolo Elementary School (former Rezin Orr School) - Renamed after Piccolo in 1973
- Laura S. Ward Elementary School (former Martin A. Ryerson School)
- Chopin Elementary School (West Town)
- Bernhard Moos Elementary School (1711 N California Ave) (West Town)

In 2012 CPS decided to close Martin A. Ryerson School. Laura S. Ward Elementary School moved into the former Ryerson building. Ryerson merged with Ward, which was previously in Garfield Park. There were members of the Ryerson community who were afraid that the Ward community would cause violent incidents at their school. Parents of Ryerson did a walkout in protest.

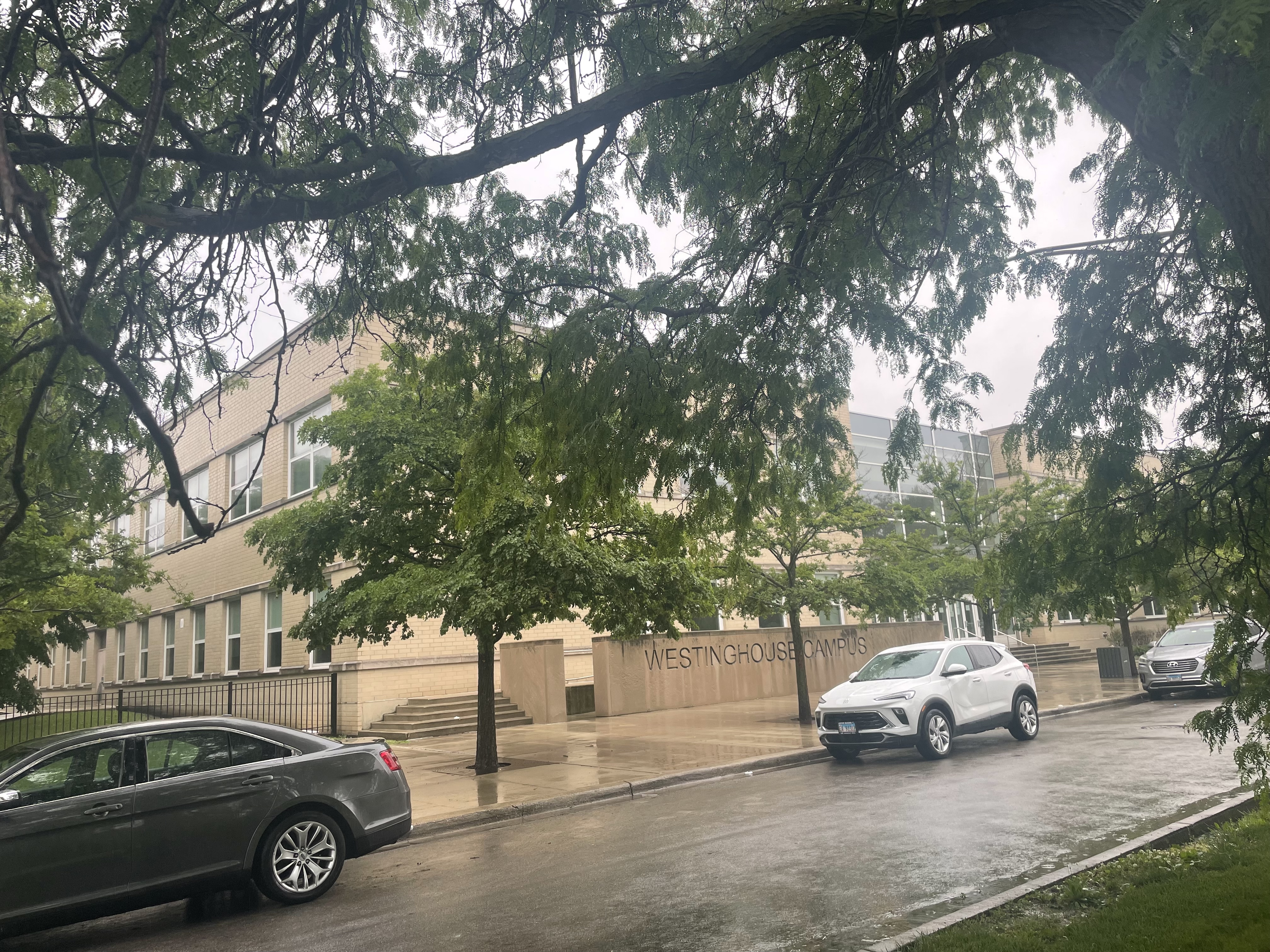
George Westinghouse College Prep

Senior high schools:

- Public high schools serving Humboldt Park include: Orr High School (in Humboldt Park); Roberto Clemente High School (on Western and Division in West Town), which has served Humboldt park since long before the 1980s; and Marshall Metropolitan High School (in East Garfield Park)
- Magnet schools:
  - George Westinghouse College Prep
  - Chicago High School for the Arts in West Town - It was scheduled to be in the former Lafayette School, which CPS closed since the number of students was too low.

Charter schools include:

- Association House High School
- Humboldt Park Montessori School
- Rowe-Clark Math & Science Academy, a Noble Network Charter High School, is in Humboldt Park.
- United Neighborhood Organization operates the Humboldt Park School.
- Polaris Charter Academy

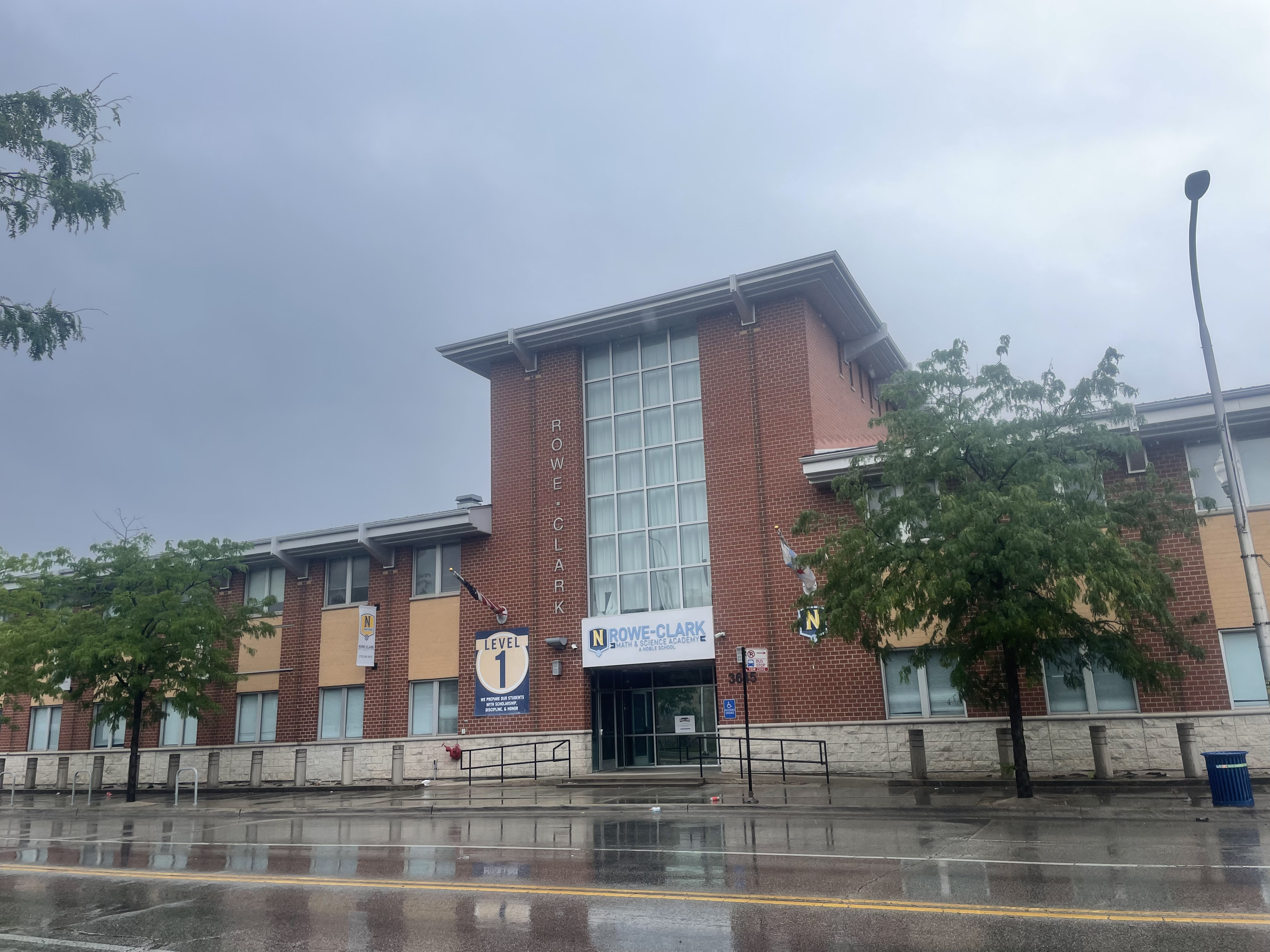
Rowe-Clark Math & Science Academy

The Roman Catholic Archdiocese of Chicago has operated Roman Catholic private schools

- Former: Our Lady of the Angels Catholic School

Historical population
Census	Pop.	Note	%±
1930	80,835		—
1940	79,329		−1.9%
1950	76,199		−3.9%
1960	71,609		−6.0%
1970	71,326		−0.4%
1980	70,879		−0.6%
1990	67,573		−4.7%
2000	65,836		−2.6%
2010	57,763		−12.3%
2020	54,165		−6.2%

=== Public libraries ===
Chicago Public Library operates, within Humboldt Park:

- Humboldt Park Library - The current facility opened on July 13, 1996, and in 2013 had 5,000 square feet (460 m^{2}) of space added.
- North Pulaski Library - The previous library burned on December 25, 1989. The current facility opened on June 15, 1996.
- Richard M. Daley-West Humboldt Library - It began operations on July 8, 2011.

== Healthcare ==
Walther Memorial Hospital was in operation until 1987. Association House of Chicago, which includes Association House High School, is located on the former hospital property.

Franklin Boulevard Hospital, in the community area, began operations in the 1930s. Franklin Boulevard treated victims of the Our Lady of the Angels fire. Annie Sweeney and Steve Mills of the Chicago Tribune wrote that this hospital "played a crucial role" in giving medical treatment in that disaster. It was described as being in "immediate risk" of shuttering by the Chicago Tribune in 1988. Later the hospital became known as West Side Community Hospital, doing business as Sacred Heart Hospital; the rename was done by the owner honoring a religious relative. The hospital was not operated by nor otherwise affiliated with any religious organization. In July 2013 that hospital closed due to losing federal funding, and the hospital owner was criminally indicted.

== Notable people ==
- Omar Aquino, senator
- Saul Bellow, writer
- John Belushi, comedian and singer
- Sandra Cisneros, writer
- Philip Erenberg, gymnast
- Jaslene Gonzalez, model and television host
- John Guzlowski, author
- Michael Mann, filmmaker
- Ramon Ocasio III, judge
- Ignacy Jan Paderewski, pianist and composer
- William E. Rodriguez, labor lawyer and first Hispanic member of the Chicago City Council
- Horatio Sanz, actor and comedian
- Daniel Sotomayor, political cartoonist
- Jade Sotomayor, drag queen

== See also ==
- Pilsen, Chicago
