= Paseo Boricua =

Street section in Chicago, Illinois

Coordinates: 41°54′10″N 87°41′49″W

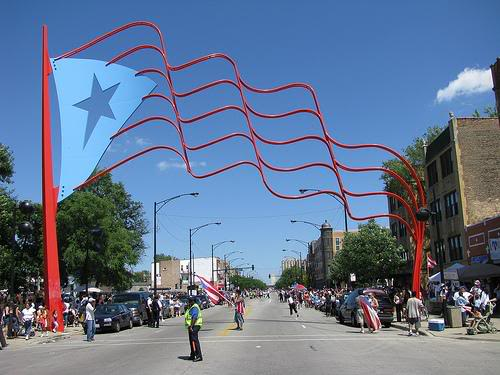
Division Street (Paseo Boricua), facing east from Mozart Street, one-half block west of California Avenue.

Paseo Boricua (loosely translated as "Boricua (Puerto Rican) Promenade") is a section of Division Street in the Humboldt Park community of the West Side of Chicago, Illinois.

It is located on Division Street, which is between Western and California avenues, in the neighborhood of Humboldt Park. Paseo Boricua is a microcosm of the Puerto Rican community.

This section is flanked at each end by a public art project installed in 1995; fifty-nine-foot-tall (18-metre) Puerto Rican flags made of steel, gateways to Paseo Boricua. This street is dedicated to Puerto Rican pride and has a walk of fame with the names of many outstanding Puerto Ricans. Many businesses are named after Puerto Rican towns. The façades of some buildings have been designed to look as if they come from old San Juan with Spanish Colonial architecture.

The Humboldt Park Paseo Boricua neighborhood is the flagship of all Puerto Rican enclaves. This neighborhood is the economic, political, and cultural capital of the Puerto Rican community in the Midwest.

== History ==
From the 1950s to the early 1990s, Humboldt Park was considered an economic dead zone by city planners and developers. Poverty and social problems contributed to the emergence of street criminal organizations that negatively affected the community. Although there was also a vital community of families, property owners, and businesses, many people from inside and outside the neighborhood saw little opportunity.

But in 1995, Division Street found new life when city officials and Latino leaders decided on a public art project to recognize the neighborhood and the residents' roots. They christened it "Paseo Boricua" and installed two metal Puerto Rican flags—each weighing 45 tons, measuring 59 feet (18 m) vertically and stretching across the street—at each end of the strip.

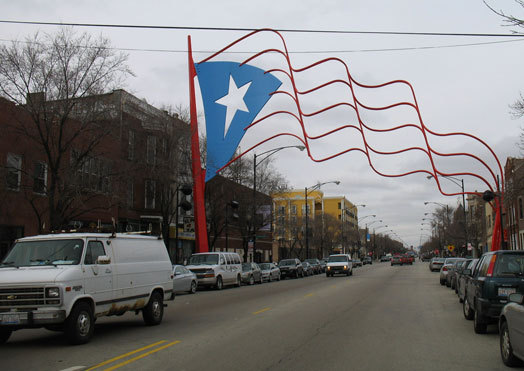
The east end of Paseo Boricua, facing west near Western Avenue.

Between the flags, the struggling neighborhood has collected itself and developed as one of the most vibrant Latino neighborhoods in Chicago, uniting the once fragmented Puerto Rican community. Since the community banded, the occupancy rate of the neighborhood rose to about 90 percent, home prices stabilized, and Chicago's 650,000 Puerto Ricans have a place they call their own.

Over time, Paseo Boricua became a place where Puerto Ricans could go to learn about their heritage. A culture center was established, and the offices of local Puerto Rican politicians relocated their offices to Division Street. Recently, the City of Chicago has set aside money for Paseo Boricua property owners who want to restore their buildings' façades.

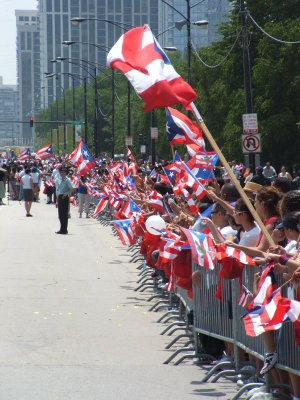
The Puerto Rican Day Parade in Paseo Boricua.

Several times a year, Paseo Boricua is fashioned in gala to celebrate important Puerto Rican holidays, such as the Three Kings Day, the Puerto Rican People's Parade, Haunted Paseo Boricua, and Fiesta Boricua, with an estimated 650,000 attendees.

It is the only officially recognized Puerto Rican neighborhood in the nation. New York City, with its vast Puerto Rican population, does not have an officially designated Puerto Rican neighborhood.

In June 2024, the part of the Humboldt Park neighborhood in Chicago known as Puerto Rico Town or Paseo Boricua officially changed its name to Barrio Borikén.

== Flag ==
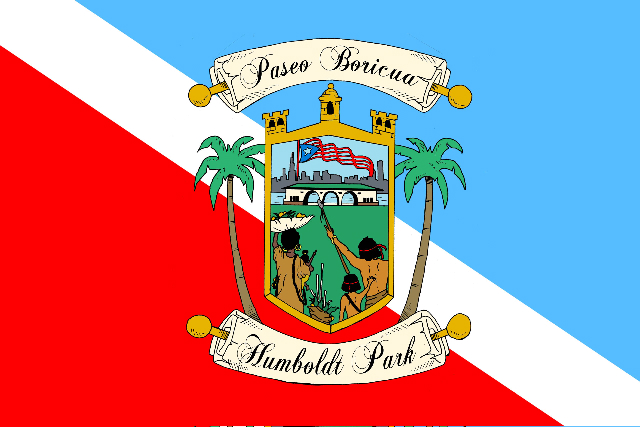

Paseo Boricua is the first location outside the Commonwealth of Puerto Rico to be granted the right to fly an official "Municipal Flag of Puerto Rico."

The creator of the flag is a Puerto Rican artist by the name of John Vergara.

== Chicago's Puerto Rican community ==
The Puerto Rican community in Chicago has a history that stretches back more than 70 years. The first Puerto Rican migration in the 1930s to Chicago was not from the island but from New York City. Only a small number of people joined this migration. The first large wave of migration to Chicago came in the late 1940s.

Starting in 1946, many people were recruited by Castle, Barton and Associates as low-wage non-union foundry workers and domestic workers. As soon as they were established in Chicago, many were joined by their spouses and families.

By the 1950s, Chicago's Puerto Rican community was centered in West Town and Humboldt Park on the city's Northwest Side as well as in nearby Lincoln Park on the North Side. Puerto Rican settlement also occurred in Lawndale on the city's West Side. Gentrification in Lincoln Park which would begin in the late 1960s displace its Puerto Rican populace, forcing people to move to the west.

The events of June 12 through 14, 1966, constituted the first major Puerto Rican urban rebellion. The uprising happened at precisely the point when the Chicago Police Department began taking "precautionary measures" to head off potential riots of the type that had already occurred in Harlem, Watts and Philadelphia by the Black masses.

== 1966 Division Street Riots ==
On June 12, 1966, Aracelis Cruz was shot on the corner of Damen Avenue and Division Street after an officer said he was carrying a gun. The shooting set off a series of confrontations between Puerto Ricans and police officers; many people said that resentment had been festering for years due to poor housing conditions, educational opportunities, alleged racism, and feelings of neglect.

At the time, police said, the shooting was justified due to extreme gang activity in the area, but witnesses said it was an unprovoked reaction by police—something that was commonplace at the time. Eighty-one policeman with 58 squad cars were called in to respond to the riots. They used tear gas and night sticks to try to quell the disturbance. The National Guard was also called in, along with six K-9 units. After a week of rioting, peace was restored.

The Rev. Dan Headley was in the crowd during the riots. He believes the disturbance has had a long-lasting effect. The 1966 Division Street Riots marked the beginning of a Puerto Rican political consciousness in Humboldt Park and Chicago. Many social, political, economic, and educational institutions were founded after the riots, including the Puerto Rican Cultural Center, Dr. Pedro Albizu Campos High School, The Young Lords, and Aspira, among many others. Also after the riots, Puerto Ricans began to participate in local and state politics, gaining election to governmental offices, such as the City Council, State Legislature, and the U.S. Congress.

Among the many changes, the Chicago Police Department worked to recruit more Puerto Rican officers; Superintendent Phil Cline said that in the early 21st century, Puerto Ricans and Latinos make up a greater part of the department. Immigration has increased from Mexico and Latin America, adding to the total Hispanic community. Each national group has its own culture.

== 1977 Humboldt Park riot ==
On Saturday, June 4, 1977, following the Puerto Rican Day Parade, Puerto Ricans returned to Paseo Boricua and Humboldt Park to celebrate. Following the shooting deaths of Julio Osorio, 26 and Rafael Cruz, 25, a riot broke out in Humboldt Park, pitting the Chicago Police Department against the Puerto Ricans of the Division Street area. The riot lasted late into the night on Saturday, and continued Sunday evening. Looters victimized businesses on Paseo Boricua, and fires burned uncontrolled. In the aftermath of the riot, the community battled for accountability from the police and the city government for the conditions that led to the riot.

== Institute of Puerto Rican Arts and Culture ==
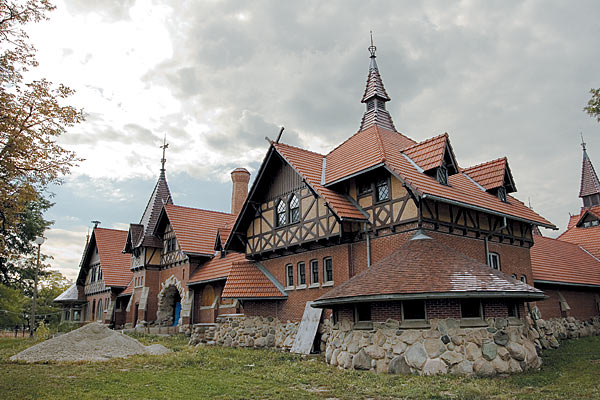
Institute of Puerto Rican Arts and Culture.

With the support of the community, Puerto Rican leaders in Chicago leased the historic Humboldt Park stables near Paseo Boricua to house the Institute of Puerto Rican Arts and Culture. The institute is the only museum in the U.S. that is completely dedicated to the history of Puerto Rican culture and the Puerto Rican diaspora. This Puerto Rican institution seeks to teach the next generation of Chicago Puerto Ricans about the area's past. About $3.4 million was spent to renovate the exterior of the building and another $3.2 million for the interior. This was funded by an ISTEA grant to the Chicago Park District, City of Chicago TIF Monies, State of Illinois grants and some donors to IPRAC.

== Other events ==
The Puerto Rican Parade Committee of Chicago has been serving their community since 1968. Now the six-day festival in Humboldt Park has become the largest Latino festival in the city of Chicago and in the Mid-West, with an estimated draw of 1.8 million attendees annually.

== Gallery ==
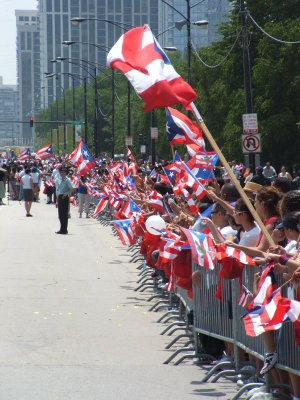
Puerto Rican Day Parade in downtown Chicago.

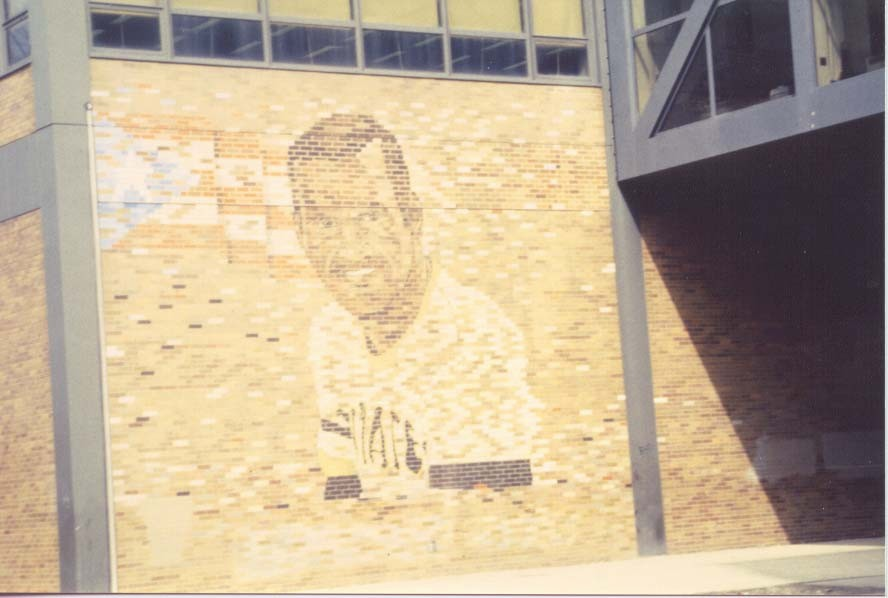
Roberto Clemente high school

Paseo Boricua Walk of Fame (Roberto Clemente)

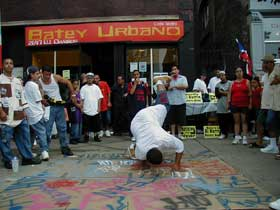
Batey Urbano

La Casita De Don Pedro
