= Garbage Offensive =

1969 garbage-dumping protests in New York City

- Photo of the Garbage Offensive taken by photographer Hiram Maristany
- Date: July 27, 1969 – September 2, 1969
- Location: East Harlem, New York, U.S.
- Caused by: Failure of New York City Department of Sanitation to adequately collect garbage in East Harlem
- Result: Initial systemic changes, including improved collection schedules, the introduction of plastic garbage bags, and alternate-side parking; Long-term return to irregular garbage collection

Parties
New York Young Lords: Residents of East Harlem	Government of New York City: New York City Department of Sanitation; New York Fire Department; New York Police Department

Lead figures
Felipe Luciano	John Lindsay

The Garbage Offensive was a community service initiative that evolved into a series of protests that occurred throughout the summer of 1969 in East Harlem, New York, United States. The offensive was organized by the New York Young Lords, a newly-formed civil rights organization. The Young Lords, after consulting with neighborhood residents, decided to address neglect on the part of the New York City Department of Sanitation in East Harlem, which was a predominantly Puerto Rican neighborhood where uncollected garbage was a significant concern. After being denied cleaning supplies by the sanitation department, the Young Lords organized weekly street cleanups in East Harlem to engage the community, but these efforts failed to attract significant attention.

Beginning on July 27, 1969, the Young Lords and East Harlem residents engaged in escalating garbage-dumping protests, obstructing major intersections with barricades and garbage piles. The protests intensified on August 17, with protesters setting garbage on fire across East Harlem. The next day, Young Lords spokesman Felipe Luciano outlined demands on behalf of the protesters, which included daily garbage collection, street cleaning, increased sanitation resources, greater diversity in employment, higher wages for sanitation workers, and the elimination of corruption within the sanitation workforce. As a result, the city instituted systemic sanitation reforms, though some of these measures were later reversed. The protests ended on September 2.

Many historians consider the Garbage Offensive a critical event for the Young Lords, with some arguing that the protests demonstrated their ability to connect local grievances to systemic issues. Others argue that the critical aspect of the offensive lay in its symbolic demonstration of decolonial action, which resulted in a shift in the community's consciousness and shaped subsequent advocacy efforts. Photographs of the protests were exhibited throughout East Harlem in 2019 as part of the exhibit Mapping Resistance: The Young Lords in El Barrio.

== History ==
=== Background ===
So we're on 110th Street and we actually asked the people, 'What do you think you need? What do you need? Is it housing? Is it police brutality?' And they said, 'Muchacho, déjate de todo eso—LA BASURA!' [Listen kid, fuggedaboutit! It's THE GARBAGE!'] And I thought, my God, all this romance, all this ideology, to pick up the garbage? But that's what they wanted.

— Felipe Luciano, Â¡Palante Siempre Palante!, dir. Iris Morales

The Young Lords, originally a Puerto Rican street gang operating in Chicago, Illinois, shifted to become a civil rights organization during the 1960s. The New York chapter of the Young Lords—formed from the merger of the Lower East Side Young Lords; (Note: One source, Jeffries, claims that the first chapter of the New York Young Lords was in East Harlem. However, two sources, Wanzer-Serrano and Fernández, claim that it was on the Lower East Side.) the Photography Workshop, an activist-oriented arts organization; and the Sociedad Albizu Campos, a reading group based at the State University of New York at Old Westbury—was established on July 26, 1969.

After its establishment, members of the organization consulted with East Harlem residents to identify their most pressing needs. East Harlem, also known as "El Barrio", has a significant Puerto Rican population, and since the 1930s has been known as the "unofficial capital of Puerto Rican New York". The neighborhood was neglected by the New York City Department of Sanitation, resulting in the accumulation of uncollected garbage. In many cases, sanitation workers collected only half of the garbage in the neighborhood, with the remainder left scattered on the street. Furthermore, some sanitation workers would only collect garbage if they were bribed to do so.

In July 1969, the Young Lords entered a sanitation depot to register a complaint and request cleaning supplies. They were denied and met with resistance from sanitation depot staff. Over the next three weeks on Sundays, the Young Lords swept streets in East Harlem. Ideologically, the Young Lords viewed mass participation as a means to cultivate revolutionary consciousness among community members. In addition to sweeping, they engaged with members of the community, appealing to traditional Puerto Rican values and attracting additional volunteers to the organization. However, the Sunday street sweeping campaign was ultimately unable to attract significant attention from either the public or from government officials.

=== Protests ===
Intersection of Third Avenue and 110th Street in Manhattan

On July 27, the Young Lords deposited garbage across the intersections of Third Avenue and 110th Street, as well as several other intersections, including on First Avenue, Lexington Avenue, and Madison Avenue. They also constructed barricades to disrupt traffic. According to one Young Lords member, as many as 300 residents of East Harlem participated in these garbage-dumping demonstrations. Garbage-dumping protests continued throughout August, with one demonstration on August 17 resulting in garbage being set on fire at multiple intersections across the neighborhood, as well as the destruction of three abandoned cars. After the arrest of Ildefenso Santiago, a Puerto Rican motorist whose car was blocked by burning garbage, the protest escalated even further, with demonstrators throwing bottles at responding law enforcement and fire personnel. After negotiations between the Young Lords and the police, Santiago was fined and released from police custody. The next day, the Young Lords held a rally celebrating his release. At the rally, Young Lords spokesman Felipe Luciano clarified the protesters' demands:

- That the sanitation men come pick up garbage each day (including Sunday)
- That sidewalks and gutters be kept clean each day
- That the city grant a minimum of ten more trash cans for every block and ten brooms for every block association
- That the city hire more Puerto Rican and black workers
- That sanitation men who do their job get a salary increase
- No more payoffs from the people to the garbagemen

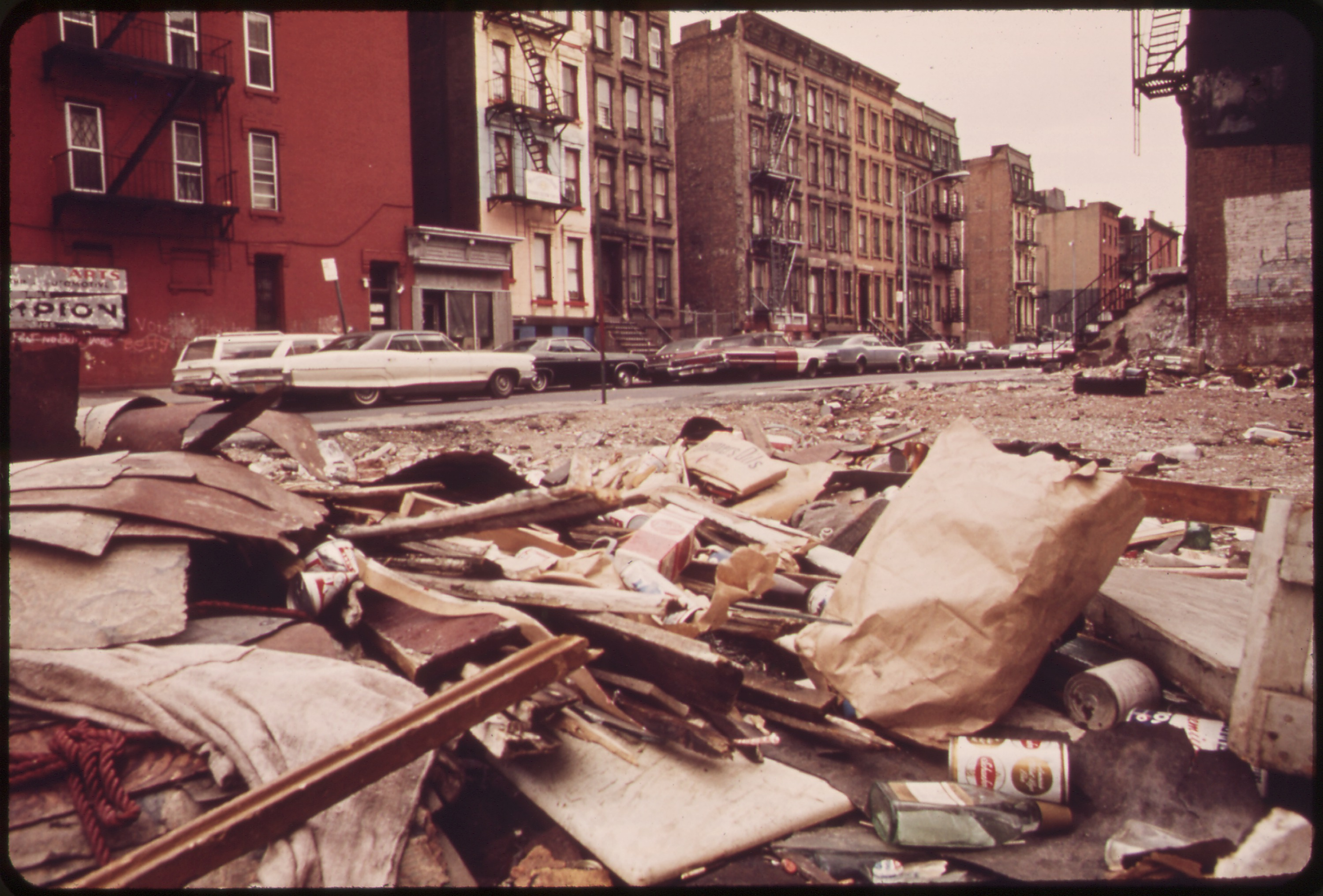
Empty lot strewn with trash at 108th Street and Lexington Avenue, Manhattan, 1973

The protests drew the attention of mayor John Lindsay and mayoral candidate Mario Procaccino, who both put forth competing plans to address sanitation issues in New York City. Lindsay also sent his Puerto Rican aide to meet with the Young Lords several times. However, the Young Lords refused to meet with him. Eventually, the Department of Sanitation began initiating systemic reforms within the Department of Sanitation, including improved collection schedules, the introduction of plastic garbage bags, and alternate-side parking, significantly increasing collection efficiency. However, academic Darrel Wanzer-Serrano notes that while sanitation improvements were initially reported, the Young Lords and contemporary observers noted a return to irregular garbage collection soon after. The Garbage Offensive protests concluded on September 2, with members of the organization agreeing to shift away from street activism and towards community service programs.

== Legacy ==
=== Commemoration ===
External image
- "Young Lords, The Garbage Offensive", photographed by Hiram Maristany, 1969

Photographer Hiram Maristany took numerous photographs of the Garbage Offensive demonstrations. According to Maristany:

I knew if I don't take these images, we're going to leave it to someone who doesn't know the first goddamn thing about us, and they're going to define everything there is to know about us.

Maristany's photographs of the demonstrations were featured in an exhibition entitled Mapping Resistance: The Young Lords in El Barrio, curated by artist Miguel Luciano and displayed across multiple East Harlem locations in 2019.

=== Historiography ===
Historian Johanna Fernández argues that the Garbage Offensive was a pivotal event for the Young Lords, allowing them to transcend typical community organizing by linking "daily problems of city life" to systemic issues, including those of "capitalism and colonial rule". According to Fernández, the Garbage Offensive benefited a broad spectrum of New Yorkers, and the Young Lords' struggle for dignity and recognition helped empower people of Puerto Rican descent. Building on Fernández's work, historian Erik Wallenberg argues that the Garbage Offensive was an example of "environmental justice organizing", revealing the racist neglect of sanitation services in East Harlem and "linking social and environmental struggles".

Meanwhile, Wanzer-Serrano argues that the Garbage Offensive should be interpreted as being more than simple "political tool" focused on immediate service provision, instead viewing it as an "embodied act of decolonization". He emphasizes the performative and symbolic aspects of the offensive, claiming the Young Lords used accumulated garbage piles, the "literal and symbolic excesses of the liberal capitalist system", to "[open] up a space for the Young Lords to advance decoloniality more broadly" in East Harlem. In Wanzer-Serrano's view, the offensive's lasting impact was not in the immediate resolution of the garbage issue, but in its ability to alter the people's "consciousness about their relationship to the system" and establish a "decolonial ethos" that influenced future activism.

== See also ==
- 1967 New York City riot
- Church Offensive
- Young Lords

== Sources ==
- Agusto-DaFonseca, Gustavo; Henken, Ted (2008). "East Harlem". In Schaefer, Richard T. (ed.). Encyclopedia of Race, Ethnicity, and Society. Vol. 1. Chicago: Sage. pp. 429–431.
- Jeffries, Judson (2003). "From Gang-Bangers to Urban Revolutionaries: The Young Lords of Chicago". Journal of the Illinois State Historical Society. 95 (3): 288–304. JSTOR 40193998.
- Beliz, Crisol G. (2015). "'They Do Not Treat Us Like Human Beings': Latino-Police Relations in 1960's Chicago". McNair Scholars Journal. 19 (1): 6–16.
- Enck-Wanzer, Darrel, ed. (2010). "Origins of the Young Lords". The Young Lords: A Reader. New York; London: New York University Press. pp. 30–36.
- Fernández, Johanna (2020). The Young Lords: A Radical History. Chapel Hill: University of North Carolina Press. ISBN 978-1-4696-5345-7.
- Wanzer-Serrano, Darrel (2015). The New York Young Lords and the Struggle for Liberation. Philadelphia: Temple University Press. ISBN 978-1-4399-1204-1.
