= 1966 riots =

1966 riots may refer to:

- Hong Kong 1966 riots, April 6–8, Hong Kong
- Division Street riots, June 12–14, Chicago, IL
- Hough riots, July 18–23, Cleveland, OH
- Compton's Cafeteria riot, August, San Francisco, CA
- Benton Harbor riots, August 30–September 5, Benton Harbor, MI
- Sunset Strip curfew riots, November 12, Los Angeles, CA
- 12-3 incident, December 3, Macau, China
