= Bruce Johnson (minister) =

American Methodist minister (1938–1969)

The Reverend Bruce Johnson

Personal life
- Born: Bruce W. Johnson Jr. 1938 Aurora, Illinois, U.S.
- Died: September 29, 1969 (aged 30–31) Chicago, Illinois, U.S.
- Spouse: Eugenia Johnson (m. 1962; died 1969)
- Children: Brian Johnson, Kevin Johnson, and Perry Johnson
- Education: Garrett–Evangelical Theological Seminary

Religious life
- Religion: Christianity (Protestantism)
- Denomination: Methodist
- Church: Armitage Avenue United Methodist Church
- Profession: Minister

Reverend Bruce W. Johnson Jr. (1938 – September 29, 1969) was a Methodist minister in the Lincoln Park neighborhood of Chicago, Illinois. He was pastor of Armitage Avenue United Methodist Church (renamed "People's Church") and worked closely with the Young Lords, a Puerto Rican civil rights organization and former street gang. Johnson and his wife Marjorie Eugenia Johnson (née Ransier) were found stabbed to death in their home on September 29, 1969.

== Early life ==
Bruce Johnson was born in Aurora, Illinois in 1938. He met his wife Eugenia while they both attended Garrett–Evangelical Theological Seminary in Evanston, Illinois. The couple married in 1962 and had three sons, Brian, Kevin, and Perry. Johnson was ordained as a Methodist minister in 1964.

== Involvement with the Young Lords ==
Johnson offered aid and solidarity to the Young Lords during their occupation of the McCormick Theological Seminary in May 1969. Soon after, the Young Lords approached officials at Armitage Avenue United Methodist Church, where Johnson was pastor, about setting up a day-care center at the church. Johnson was receptive to the idea, but the congregation was not. After a four-day sit-in that began on June 11, 1969, the Young Lords occupied the church. Lincoln Park residents asked the city to inspect the church to determine if the site was in compliance with state regulations in hopes of quashing the day care project. The inspection found eleven violations that cost an estimated ten thousand dollars to correct. The Young Lords raised the funds, and two months later a day-care center was opened in the basement of the church. A medical facility and breakfast program for poor children were added later. Johnson supported the takeover of the church, which the Young Lords eventually renamed the "People's Church".

== Death ==
Johnson and his wife were found stabbed to death in their apartment on September 29, 1969. Their murders remain unsolved.

== Legacy ==
Bruce Johnson and Eugenia Johnson continue to be recognized for their support of the Young Lords. On September 29, 2019, a service was held at Holy Covenant United Methodist Church to commemorate the fiftieth anniversary of the couple's deaths. Speakers at the service included Young Lords founder José Cha Cha Jiménez, DePaul University professor Jacqueline Lazu, and leaders from the Presbyterian McCormick Theological Seminary (occupied by the Young Lords in 1969). Following the memorial, attendees marched through the Lincoln Park neighborhood to the former site of People's Church.

== See also ==
- Young Lords
- José Cha Cha Jiménez
- Rainbow Coalition (Fred Hampton)
