= Latin American Defense Organization =

Latino advocacy organization

- Abbreviation: LADO
- Formation: 1966
- Founded at: Wicker Park, Chicago, Illinois, U.S.
- Dissolved: 1973
- Purpose: Latino advocacy
- Members: ~300 members and supporters
- Key people: Obed López; Olga Pedrosa

The Latin American Defense Organization (LADO) was an American Latino advocacy organization founded in 1966 by Mexican and Puerto Rican activists to represent the Latino community in Wicker Park, Chicago, Illinois. Its core tenets included inter-ethnic solidarity, community ownership, direct action, and resistance to ethnic nationalism. LADO engaged in welfare activism during the 1960s and 1970s, picketing a local welfare office in 1967 and forming a welfare union. They were also known for participating in the occupation of McCormick Theological Seminary alongside the Young Lords, as well as their participation in a rally protesting the shooting of Young Lords member Manuel Ramos. LADO's offices were destroyed in an arson attack in March 1970, and they were targeted for infiltration by the Chicago Police Department's "Red Squad", ultimately ceasing operations in 1973. Scholars highlight LADO's role in raising awareness about discrimination against Latinos, its adoption of strategies influenced by the Civil rights movement, and its own influence on the Young Lords, another activist group active in Chicago, New York City, and across the East Coast.

== Background ==
During the 1950s and 1960s, Latinos in Chicago, including both Mexicans and Puerto Ricans, were regularly harassed by police under the pretext that they might be illegal immigrants. There were also several high-profile cases of police brutality against Puerto Ricans during the 1960s. In 1965, police broke into the home of Celestino A. González and Silvano Burgos, leading to their arrest. The men were subjected to severe beatings, with González losing consciousness. Later, on 12 June 1966, during celebrations for Puerto Rican Week, a police officer shot a man named Arcelis Cruz in the leg. The shooting led to unrest in the assembled crowd, followed by the deployment of a canine unit, leading to the injury of another man. This escalation triggered the Division Street riots, which resulted in further injures and significant property damage over three days.

In response, on July 15 and 16, the Chicago Commission on Human Relations (CCHR) held a hearing before which 54 of the city's Puerto Rican and Spanish-speaking residents, who testified to the problems faced by their communities. Police brutality was the predominant concern, but speakers also cited a lack of jobs; poor housing, education, and city services; political disenfranchisement; and discrimination levied against them by local unions. However, the CCHR attributed these issues to cultural miscommunication. The city also began surveilling and harassing of individuals suspected of being, or labeled as, communist and socialist agitators, leveraging its already-robust surveillance infrastructure to do so.

== Founding and ideology ==
We believe: 1) in the unity of all the Latin American people, 2) in the unity with all those groups that face the same problems that we do (i.e. black community, Appalachian whites), 3) in the need to develop our own institutions, 4) in the absence of any mechanism to resolve our legitimate grievances, we believe in the right to direct action.

— LADO's 'four principles of action', quoted in 'LADO: The Latin Defense Organization' by Clara López

LADO was founded in late 1966 after the Division Street riots by a committee of Mexican and Puerto Rican activists. One founding member, Olga Pedrosa, was a welfare caseworker. Obed López, another founding member, served as one of the organization's leading members and its primary spokesman. López was a Mexican-American immigrant who, according to historian Felipe Hinojosa, was "versed in the discourses of Latin American politics". He had been a student organizer in Mexico, and was a member of both the Fair Play for Cuba Committee and the Chicago chapter of the 26th of July Movement, a political party led by Fidel Castro and Che Guevara that played a key role in the Cuban Revolution. He had also been falsely arrested and falsely charged with possession of Molotov cocktails in August 1966. While the charges were dismissed after two months, the police publicly labeled López a communist at that time.

According to Obed, LADO was founded to "represent the persons of the Wicker Park community". At the time, Wicker Park was a predominantly Puerto Rican neighborhood. LADO's "four principles of action" advocated for unity between Latin Americans of different nationalities, unity with Black Americans and white Appalachian Americans, community-owned institutions, and the "right to direct action". It was also broadly opposed to ethnic nationalism. According to historian Johanna Fernández, this stance emerged in opposition to the more conservative Spanish Action Committee of Chicago (SACC), another organization that emerged in the aftermath of the Division Street riots. The SACC's leadership was primarily Puerto Rican, often to the exclusion of other groups with "common class interests", per Obed's brother, Omar. Obed claims that the SACC's leader, Juan Díaz, did not admit him into the organization because of his Mexican heritage.

== Activity ==
In September 1966 LADO was involved in a boycott campaign against two National Tea grocery stores on Division Street, with LADO alleging that the stores engaged in discriminatory hiring practices against Latinos. Per the police's assessment, López viewed the initiative as a "Pilot Program", which, if successful, could be expanded to additional targets, potentially strengthening LADO's influence among neighborhood small businesses. However, according to an advertisement placed in the Students for a Democratic Society (SDS)'s newspaper New Left Notes, the organization "suffer[ed] from a lack of funds and a shortage of full-time organizers" as of December 1966 and was seeking assistance. Despite these difficulties, Obed claims that LADO collaborated with, and began working out of an office originally staffed by, organized labor activists campaigning for Illinois Senator Paul Douglas in 1967. It also produced a newspaper, developed an English tutoring program for children, and contributed to establishing a free medical clinic operated by physicians from Children's Memorial Hospital, alongside medical personnel from Cook County Hospital and Northwestern University.

Soon after it was established, LADO was targeted by the police's "Red Squad", an undercover unit that targeted alleged communist, anti-racist, and decolonial organizations. The Red Squad infiltrated such organizations, conducted surveillance on them, and sometimes incited members to engage in reckless behavior. LADO organizers identified several infiltrators who attempted to sow division regarding the organization's leadership and to extract information from members in an attempt to uncover ties with the Communist Party USA. According to Obed's daughter, Clara López, the public accusations that Obed was a communist caused many low-income Puerto Ricans to avoid seeking LADO's assistance, fearing stigmatization. According to Clara, police also began following López, but encountered difficulties as López employed evasive maneuvers. These maneuvers included driving in circles, backtracking, and, according to a surveillance report, "just about any other tactic that might throw off surveillance". Clara also alleges that Mayor Richard J. Daley used the city's gang intelligence unit to "give gang members a negative image of LADO." This resulted in an instance where an armed gang member confronted Obed and two others at gunpoint in his home, demanding that he cease his organizing activities.

Inspired by Pedrosa's experiences within the welfare system, LADO was heavily involved in welfare activism. Many Latinos receiving welfare assistance at the time faced significant difficulties, including overcrowded welfare offices, long wait times, and an insufficient number of Spanish-speaking caseworkers. LADO picketed an office of the Illinois Department of Public Aid in May 1967, demanding better service. During the protest, department officials disbursed $100 (equivalent to $966 in 2025) to one woman, which LADO regarded as a favorable outcome. LADO eventually founded a welfare union, which assisted individuals on welfare in procuring their benefits and provided food to those waiting for their appointments.

In early 1969, (Note: According to Jeffries, the occupation began in April. However, according to Hinojosa, it began in May.) LADO participated in the occupation of the Presbyterian McCormick Theological Seminary alongside the Young Lords, the Black Panther Party, the Young Patriots Organization, and the SDS. The occupation lasted for almost a week, with occupiers accusing the seminary of complicity in the displacement of Puerto Ricans from Lincoln Park. Occupiers barricaded the building, demanding that the seminary supply funding for low-income housing, in addition to establishing a children's center, a Latin American cultural center, and a "people's law office" to provide legal assistance for people with limited financial resources. The law office would be staffed by members of LADO. While the seminary president initially threatened police intervention, he ultimately agreed to the occupiers' demands, disclosing the seminary's financial records, allocating $600,000 for housing initiatives, granting community access to seminary facilities, and publicly opposing urban renewal policies.

LADO also participated in a rally called in reaction to the shooting of Young Lords member Manuel Ramos by a Chicago police officer in 1969. The rally, which was attended by members of the Black Panthers, Young Lords, and SDS, took place at the intersection of Armitage Avenue and Halsted Street. Estimates of attendance at the rally run from nearly 1,000 to 3,000, with undercover provocateurs installed by police attempting to provoke protesters into attacking the home of Mayor Daley. Protesters ignored the provocateurs and traveled to the Deering police station, where Ramos was shot. A memorial service was later held for Ramos at St. Theresa's Catholic Church on Armitage Avenue.

In March 1970, LADO offices were ransacked and destroyed in an arson attack, resulting in the destruction of records and furniture. Despite this, members of LADO were able to assist in the creation of the Segundo Ruiz Belvis Cultural Center, a Latino cultural center named after an abolitionist and Puerto Rican independence advocate, in 1971. The center persists to this day. LADO ultimately ceased operations in 1973. In an interview with José "Cha Cha" Jiménez, leader of the Chicago Young Lords, Obed cites loss of organizational momentum and competition with other activist groups as factors in the organization's decline. In a subsequent lawsuit filed by the American Civil Liberties Union (ACLU), it was alleged that two Red Squad officers had ransacked LADO's offices, seizing a list of roughly "300 [LADO] members and supporters" during the operation. (Note: It is unclear if this was referring to the 1970 arson incident or a separate incident.) The ACLU ultimately lost the case on appeal.

== Historiography ==
Various scholars have discussed the historical significance of LADO. Clara López argues that LADO helped raise awareness of the discrimination Latinos faced under police and welfare agencies, ultimately mobilizing the community to advocate for better treatment. Meanwhile, historian Michael Staudenmaier contends that LADO was "among the first organizations to draw directly upon the strategic approaches associated with the Civil Rights Movement". He and Johanna Fernández both argue that LADO served as a direct inspiration for the Young Lords, whose influence spread from Chicago to New York City and along the East Coast. Fernández claims that the Young Lords supported various LADO programs, contributing to the Young Lords' politicization. Obed López, in his interview with Jiménez, recalls an incident in which LADO and the Young Lords picketed the offices of a local mafia-connected real estate developer who had previously threatened Jiménez with a submachine gun, identifying it as one of their first collaborations. Fernández notes that the Young Lords also provided security services for LADO's welfare union.

== Sources ==
- "ACLU files lawsuit on Chicago police". The Daily Journal. No. 66. 1974. JSTOR community.36694187.
- Beliz, Crisol G. (2015). "'They Do Not Treat Us Like Human Beings': Latino-Police Relations in 1960's Chicago". McNair Scholars Journal. 19 (1): 6–16.
- Cruz, Wilfredo (2004). Images of America: Puerto Rican Chicago. Charleston, SC, Chicago, IL, Portsmouth, NH, San Francisco CA: Arcadia Publishing.
- Fernández, Lilia (2012). Brown in the Windy City: Mexicans and Puerto Ricans in Postwar Chicago. Chicago: The University of Chicago Press. ISBN 9780226212845.
- Fernández, Johanna (2020). The Young Lords: A Radical History. Chapel Hill: University of North Carolina Press. ISBN 978-1-4696-5345-7.
- Hinojosa, Felipe (2021). Apostles of Change: Latino Radical Politics, Church Occupations, and the Fight to Save the Barrio. Austin: University of Texas Press. doi:10.7560/321980. ISBN 978-1-4773-2201-7.
- Jeffries, Judson (2003). "From Gang-Bangers to Urban Revolutionaries: The Young Lords of Chicago". Journal of the Illinois State Historical Society. 95 (3): 288–304. JSTOR 40193998. Archived from the original on March 30, 2025.
- Johnson, Sylvester (2020). "Red Squads and Black Radicals: Reading Agency in the Archive". Journal of the American Academy of Religion. 88 (2): 387–406. doi:10.1093/jaarel/lfaa018.
- López, Clara (1997). "LADO: The Latin American Defense Organization". Diálogo. 2 (1): 23–27.
- López-Zacarias, Obed (2012). "Obed López-Zacarias video interview and biography" (Interview). Interviewed by Jiménez, José. Grand State Valley University. Archived from the original on September 13, 2024.
- Padilla, Félix M. (1997). "Evolution and Resolution of Conflict". Diálogo. 2 (1): 8–21. Archived from the original on June 6, 2024.
- "Speak Spanish?". New Left Notes. No. 46. Students for a Democratic Society. 1966. JSTOR community.28944289.
- Staudenmaier, Michael (2016). "War on Poverty, War on Division Street: Puerto Rican Chicago in the 1960s through the Lens of the Janet Nolan Collection" (PDF). Centro Journal. 28 (2): 180–203.
