= Young Lords =

Civil and human rights organization

- Young Lords logo
- Abbreviation: YLO/YLP
- Founded: 1959; 67 years ago
- Dissolved: 1972; 54 years ago
- Succeeded by: Puerto Rican Revolutionary Workers Organization (PRRWO)
- Ideology: Marxism–Leninism; Revolutionary nationalism; Puerto Rican independence
- Political position: Far-left
- National affiliation: Rainbow Coalition
- Colors: Black and purple
- Slogan: "Tengo Puerto Rico en mi corazon" ("I have Puerto Rico in my heart")

The Young Lords, also known as the Young Lords Organization (YLO), were a far-left political organization that developed from a Chicago street gang founded in 1959. With major branches in Chicago and New York City, they were known for their direct action campaigns, including building occupations, sit-ins, and garbage-dumping protests. They also provided community service programs for the neighborhoods they operated in, including childcare and medical services, as well as free breakfasts.

Under the leadership of José "Cha Cha" Jiménez, who was inspired by civil rights leaders and the Black Panther Party, the Chicago Young Lords allied themselves with various socialist organizations. They also opposed urban renewal plans pursued by the city in Lincoln Park and engaged in various direct action campaigns to demand resources and services for the Puerto Rican community there. These included the occupations of the McCormick Theological Seminary and the Armitage Avenue Methodist Church.

Inspired by the Chicago Young Lords, a New York chapter was established in East Harlem. After consulting with neighborhood residents, the New York Young Lords began the Garbage Offensive, a series of garbage-dumping protests occurring throughout the summer of 1969. Soon after, they released their "Thirteen-Point Program", which called for Puerto Rican independence and advocated for revolutionary nationalism and socialism. Their Church Offensive at the First Spanish United Methodist Church (FSUMC) in East Harlem garnered significant attention and led to an increase in membership. The New York Young Lords also advocated for healthcare reform, proposing a "10 Point Health Program", screening for lead poisoning and tuberculosis, and, for a brief period, occupying Lincoln Hospital in the South Bronx. The New York chapter split from the main organization in 1970 to form the Young Lords Party (YLP).

Jiménez and other Young Lords leaders were repeatedly targeted for detention and arrest in Chicago. Meanwhile, a proposed expansion of the YLP into Puerto Rico encountered logistical difficulties, ultimately failing to gain traction and leading to the closure of several of the YLP's New York offices in June 1971. In June 1972, the YLP was renamed the Puerto Rican Revolutionary Workers Organization (PRRWO), with some members leaving to join the Partido Socialista Puertorriqueño (PSPR, transl. 'Puerto Rican Socialist Party'). The Chicago Young Lords also ceased operations in 1972. The FBI's COINTELPRO program significantly contributed to the Young Lords' decline using a variety of disruptive tactics, including infiltration and surveillance.

== Chicago Young Lords ==
=== Background ===
Puerto Ricans began migrating to Chicago in the 1920s. A distinct Puerto Rican community emerged in 1946 with the arrival of several groups of migrants, including University of Chicago graduate enrollees and industrial contract laborers. Many were considered racially white in Puerto Rico, but were designated as colored in Chicago and treated as second-class citizens. They were required to sit in segregated sections on public transit and often stopped by state authorities, who mistook them for undocumented Mexican immigrants, for interrogation. During the 1950s, numerous Puerto Ricans were displaced by slum clearance policies, including in the La Clark neighborhood. Many of the displaced relocated to the Lincoln Park area. While Lincoln Park was a highly diverse neighborhood by the 1960s, its individual streets remained divided along racial and ethnic lines. Some public spaces, such as beaches and parks, were de facto segregated because of white gang activity, with Black and Latino residents experiencing harassment in those areas.

=== Origins ===
==== Street gang ====
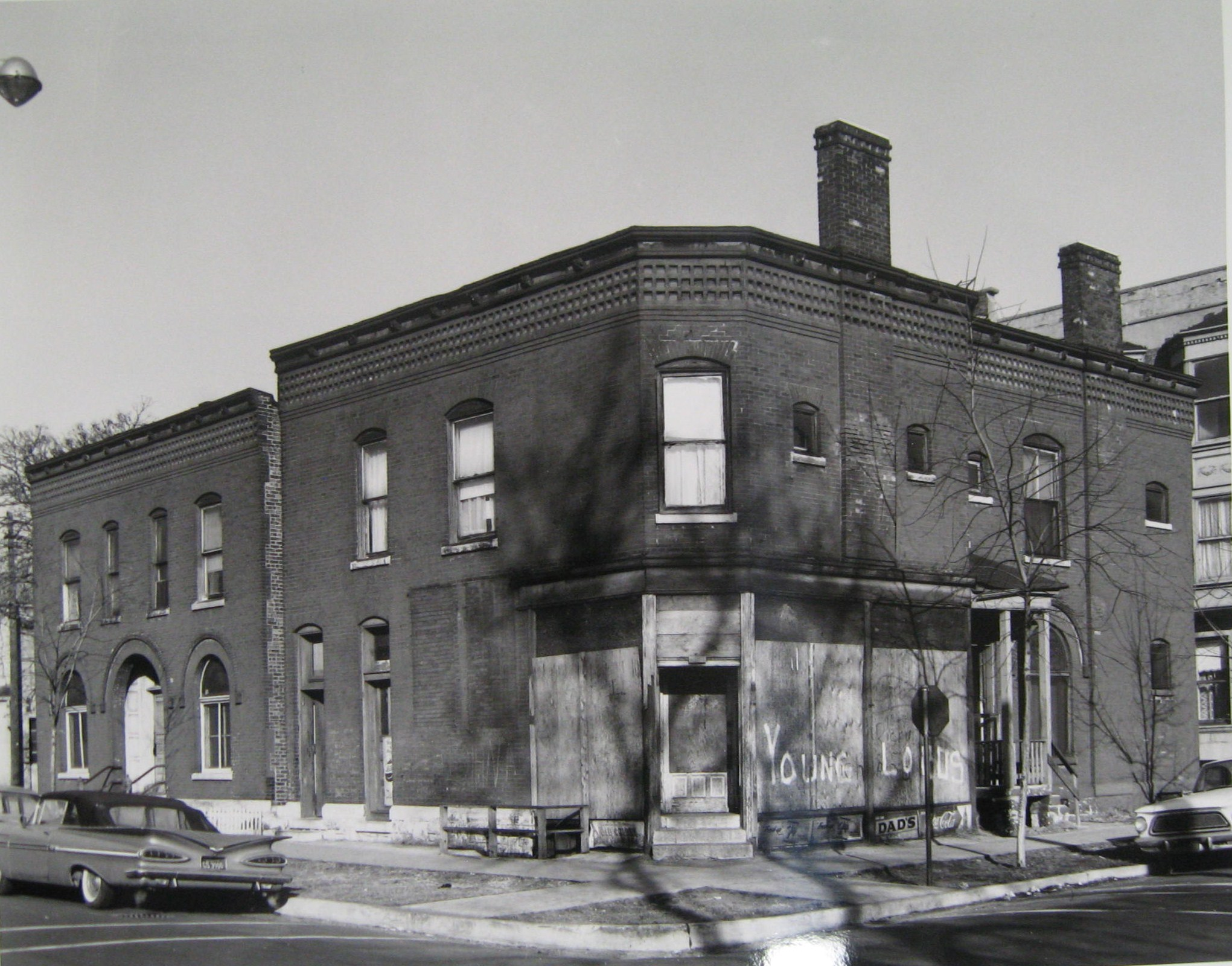
Building with "Young Lords" spraypainted on the side, Lincoln Park, Chicago, 1964

The Young Lords were first established as an informal youth social group at Arnold Junior High School on the border of the Near North Side and Lincoln Park community areas of Chicago in 1959. However, due to the persistent violence inflicted on Puerto Ricans by local white gangs, the Young Lords quickly developed into a street gang. The group was led by Orlando Dávila, and founding members included Benny Perez, David Rivera, Fermin Perez, Joe Vincente, Sal del Rivero, and José "Cha Cha" Jiménez. The gang, whose colors were purple and black, participated in a variety of criminal activities, including motor vehicle theft and street fighting. Jiménez, who became the gang's leader in the early 1960s, was repeatedly incarcerated during his teenage years for offenses ranging from theft to assault.

==== Transition to activist organization ====
There were several high-profile cases of police brutality against Puerto Ricans in Chicago in the 1960s. In 1965, police broke into the home of two Puerto Rican Chicago residents, Celestino A. González and Silvano Burgos, leading to their arrest. The men were subjected to severe beatings, with González losing consciousness. Later, in 1966, during celebrations for Puerto Rican Week, a police officer shot a man named Arcelis Cruz. The shooting led to unrest in the assembled crowd, followed by the deployment of a canine unit, leading to the injury of another man. This escalation triggered the Division Street riots, which resulted in further injures and significant property damage. At a hearing about the riots, Puerto Ricans identified police brutality as a significant concern for the community. In the aftermath, activists and advocacy organizations, including the newly formed Latin American Defense Organization (LADO), called for structural change, advocating for unity between Latin Americans of various nationalities as well as Black Americans.

In 1968, while in prison on drug charges, Jiménez was introduced to books by civil rights activist Martin Luther King Jr. and Nation of Islam spokesman Malcolm X. He also learned about the Chicago chapter of the Black Panther Party from the radio station WBON, which was played frequently in the prison. After being released in mid-1968, Jiménez formed a close friendship with Fred Hampton, the leader of the Chicago Black Panthers. He also found employment with the Urban Training Center, an organization founded by the Presbyterian Church, where he was invited by minister Victor Nazario to attend a conference for Latino activists. Several members of the Young Lords attended the conference. Jiménez became more politically active, forming a short-lived organization called the Puerto Rican Progressive Movement and becoming vice president of an educational reform organization. In 1968, the Young Lords incorporated "the Lordettes", previously a women's auxiliary group, into their primary organization.

Also in 1968, activist Patricia Devine convinced Jiménez that a planned urban renewal project would jeopardize current residents of Lincoln Park. While he was initially suspicious of Devine because of her communist ties, the Young Lords eventually agreed to take action in opposition to the project. They disrupted a planning meeting of the Lincoln Park Conservation Association where a vote was held to approve neighborhood demolition, damaging the venue the meeting was held at. Soon after, they established ties with various socialist organizations, including the Chicago Black Panthers. In February 1969, the Young Lords officially adopted the Black Panthers' Ten-Point Program, and in March, they began publishing a newspaper: the YLO.

A Chicago police officer shot Young Lords member Manuel Ramos in 1969, allegedly for pointing a gun at him. The Young Lords organized a rally in response, which was attended by members of the Black Panthers, LADO, and Students for a Democratic Society (SDS). The rally took place at the intersection of Armitage Avenue and Halsted Street. Estimates of attendance run from nearly 1,000 to 3,000, with undercover provocateurs installed by police attempting to provoke protesters into attacking the home of mayor Richard J. Daley. Protesters ignored the provocateurs, and traveled to the Deering police station, where Ramos was shot. A memorial service was later held for Ramos at St. Theresa's Catholic Church on Armitage Avenue.

=== Building occupations ===
We believe in an equal share of the government, sort of like socialism. This is what we believe, and people are entitled to their beliefs. People are entitled to work for what they believe in.

— Jose "Cha-Cha" Jimenez, interviewed at the scene of the Armitage Avenue Methodist Church occupation, ¡Palante, Siempre Palante!, dir. Iris Morales

In early 1969, (Note: According to Jeffries, the occupation began in April. According to Hinojosa, it began in May.) the Young Lords occupied the Presbyterian McCormick Theological Seminary in collaboration with the Black Panthers, LADO, the Young Patriots Organization, and the SDS for almost a week, accusing the seminary of complicity in the displacement of Puerto Ricans from Lincoln Park. They barricaded the building and demanded that the seminary supply funding for low-income housing, in addition to establishing a children's center, a Latin American cultural center, and a "people's law office" to provide legal assistance for people with limited financial resources. While the seminary president initially threatened police intervention, he ultimately agreed to the occupiers' demands, disclosing the seminary's financial records, allocating $600,000 for housing initiatives, granting community access to seminary facilities, and publicly opposing urban renewal policies. Young Lords membership increased as a result of the occupation.

The Young Lords also occupied the Armitage Avenue Methodist Church in July 1969 after the church denied the Young Lords rental space for several proposed initiatives, including a daycare center, a free breakfast program, and a health clinic. While church pastor Bruce Johnson supported the Young Lords' proposals, many members of the congregation and the church board opposed them. When congregants called the police to the site of the occupation, Johnson intervened, saying that there was "a misunderstanding" and that the Young Lords had his permission to be there. Johnson allowed the Young Lords to remain in the church, and it was renamed "The People's Church", becoming the Young Lords' official headquarters in the city. City inspectors, prompted by requests from local white residents, conducted a site inspection of the proposed daycare facility and identified 11 code violations. The Young Lords proceeded to raise the requisite funds to correct the violations, and the daycare center was ultimately allowed to open. Several community service programs were also established.

=== Further activity ===
Acting on knowledge that the Chicago Department of Urban Renewal (DUR) was planning residential construction in Lincoln Park, the Young Lords proposed their own "poor people's" housing project there, with forty percent low-income units to be subsidized by the United States Department of Housing and Urban Development. The DUR ultimately rejected the Young Lords' plans. In February 1970, the Young Lords also established a free health clinic for local residents. The clinic was staffed by volunteer medical professionals and supervised by a medical student from Northwestern University. The clinic provided various services, including eye examinations and prenatal care.

== New York Young Lords ==
=== Origins ===
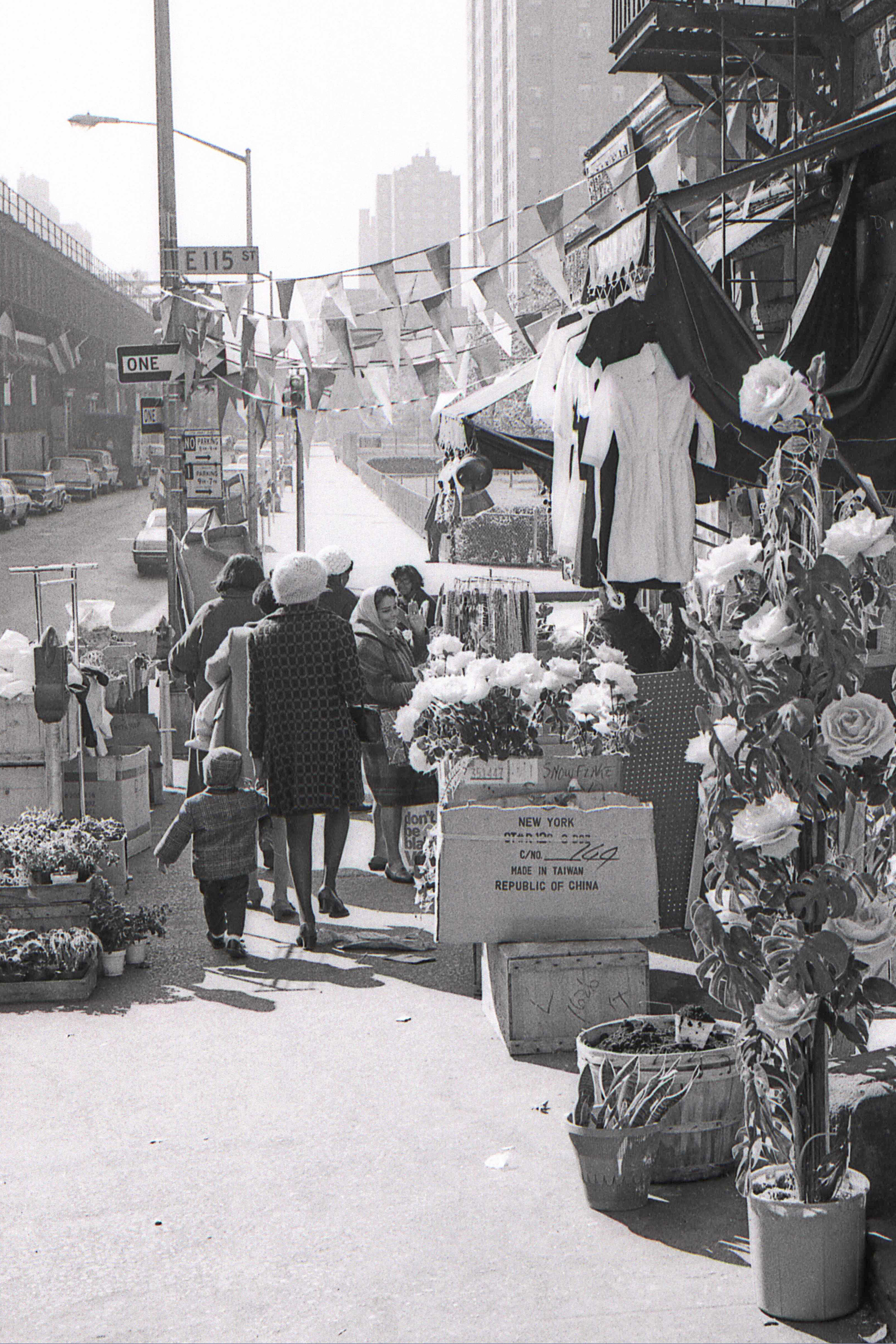
Sidewalk in East Harlem, New York, 1969

In May 1969, Jiménez met activist Jose Martinez at an SDS conference. Soon after, Martinez founded a Lower East Side chapter (Note: One source, Jeffries, states that this chapter was in East Harlem. Two sources, Wanzer-Serrano and Fernández, state that it was on the Lower East Side.) of the Young Lords with Jiménez's approval. The Lower East Side Lords merged with the Photography Workshop, an activist-oriented arts organization, and the Sociedad Albizu Campos (transl. 'Albizu Campos Society'), a reading group based at the State University of New York at Old Westbury, to form the New York Young Lords. The new organization primarily organized in East Harlem. East Harlem, also known as "El Barrio", experienced a wave of Puerto Rican migrants beginning in the 1920s and since the 1930s has been considered the "unofficial capital of Puerto Rican New York". It was also the site of the 1967 New York City riot, which broke out after a Puerto Rican man was shot by police.

At their first political demonstration in July, members of the New York Young Lords appeared at an event commemorating the attack on the Moncada Barracks in Tompkins Square Park dressed in berets and combat uniforms. A spokesperson for the organization, Felipe Luciano, gave a speech described by an attendee of the event as a "powerful and sophisticated revolutionary analysis of Puerto Rican oppression in the language of the streets" and performed an original poem entitled "Jíbaro, My Pretty Nigger".

=== Garbage Offensive ===
After consulting with neighborhood residents, the Young Lords decided to address neglect on the part of the New York City Department of Sanitation in East Harlem. In many cases, sanitation workers collected only half of the garbage in the neighborhood, with the remainder left scattered on the street. In July 1969, the Young Lords entered a sanitation depot to register a complaint and request cleaning supplies. They were denied and met with resistance from sanitation depot staff. Over the next three weeks on Sundays, the Young Lords swept streets in East Harlem. Ideologically, the Young Lords were committed to mass participation, viewing it as a means to cultivate revolutionary consciousness among community members. In addition to sweeping, they engaged with members of the community, appealing to traditional Puerto Rican values, and attracting additional volunteers to the organization. However, the Sunday cleaning efforts were ultimately unable to attract significant public participation or gain meaningful attention from government authorities.

Beginning on July 27, 1969, the Young Lords and East Harlem residents engaged in escalating garbage-dumping protests, obstructing major intersections with piled garbage and barricades. The protests intensified on August 17, with protesters setting fire to garbage across East Harlem. The next day, Luciano outlined demands on behalf of the protesters, which included daily garbage collection, street cleaning, increased sanitation resources, greater diversity in employment, higher wages for sanitation workers, and the elimination of corruption within the sanitation workforce. As a result, the city instituted systemic sanitation reforms, though some of these measures were later reversed, and the protests ended on September 2.

=== Expansion ===
After the Garbage Offensive concluded, the New York Young Lords established their headquarters in a rented storefront location on Madison Avenue. They organized an initiative providing free clothing to mothers on welfare, developed a free breakfast program in collaboration with the Black Panthers, and formed a "neighborhood police watch" to monitor police activity. In October 1969, they participated in a welfare rights protest, obstructing a bridge with garbage cans and conducting a public meeting at a local school to address community involvement in education. Also in October, they published the first draft of their "Thirteen-Point Program", which they revised and published again in their newspaper, Palante, in 1970.

=== Healthcare activism ===
In September 1969, the Young Lords produced a "Ten-Point Health Program". Inspired by contemporary healthcare reforms in Cuba, the program was proposed at a meeting of the East Harlem Health Council (EHCC). After a shift from single practitioners to larger public hospitals that took place in the aftermath of World War II, many low-income East Harlem residents received less personalized care, faced increased wait times, and were at greater risk for medical accidents. Furthermore, many hospital staff exhibited racist attitudes towards Black and Puerto Rican patients. During the 1960s, East Harlem residents experienced high rates of various chronic health conditions, including arthritis, asthma, diabetes, and hypertension. The Young Lords' program called for community control of healthcare institutions, free public healthcare, and enhanced preventive healthcare measures, among other things, and was approved by the EHCC.

Childhood lead poisoning was also common in many parts of New York City at the time, with 600 cases reported in the ten months preceding November 1968. One reason for this was the failure of city governments to enforce housing codes that restricted the use of lead-based paint on the walls of apartments. The death of a two-year-old child at the Metropolitan Hospital Center in East Harlem in September 1969 prompted the Young Lords to launch a "Lead Offensive", holding hearings on lead poisoning in East Harlem throughout September and October. City officials attempted to distribute lead-testing kits, but the Young Lords stated that the kits were not being distributed to neighborhood residents. In November, the Young Lords staged a sit-in at the office of the New York City Department of Health's deputy commissioner. They successfully convinced the department to release 200 kits, after which the Young Lords performed door-to-door screenings.

Due to a proposed plan to combine adult and pediatric emergency rooms at the Metropolitan Hospital Center as well as broader hospital budget cuts, the Young Lords participated in a sit-in at the hospital on December 5, 1969, for seven hours. While a physician remembered the Young Lords "[holding] the director hostage in his office", participants in the sit-in disputed this account, with one protester stating that the protesters "surround[ed]" the director's office instead. After extensive negotiations with the director, the Young Lords failed to prevent the emergency room merger. However, they did secure the assistance of medical staff from the hospital in providing healthcare services at the Young Lords' headquarters.

After a story covering the lead poisoning issue was published in The New York Times on December 26, and after criticism from Dr. Paul Cornely, president of the American Public Health Association, the Department of Health stated that lead testing had been suspended. According to the department, the suspension resulted from defective kits supplied by Bio-Rad Laboratories, as well as the difficulty of collecting urine samples from young children. Ultimately, however, in 1970, the Department of Health created a new "Bureau of Lead Poisoning Control", developed an "Emergency Repair Program" to remove lead paint from New York residences, implemented stricter lead regulations in the New York City housing code, increased testing, and adopted many of the community outreach tactics advocated for by the Young Lords.

In May 1970, the Young Lords also began screening for tuberculosis in East Harlem and The Bronx. As anti-tuberculosis efforts declined throughout the 1960s, the disease saw a resurgence beginning in the 1970s, with the infection rate in New York City recorded at twice the national average in 1970. The Young Lords requested that they be allowed to operate the New York Tuberculosis Association's mobile X-ray truck for around-the-clock screenings, noting that the Association's limited hours of operation (12:00 p.m. to 6:00 p.m.) were not amenable to working people's schedules. When their proposal for round-the-clock operation was denied, the Young Lords hijacked the X-ray truck, using it to conduct widespread testing in East Harlem and obtaining authorization from the East Harlem director of health to operate it using municipal funding.

=== Church Offensive ===
In October 1969, the Young Lords' free breakfast program was expelled from its location at Emmaus House, an Eastern Orthodox social housing community, due to police reports claiming that the Young Lords were affiliated with local gangs. They subsequently requested space from the First Spanish United Methodist Church (FSUMC), which is located in the center of East Harlem, but were dismissed by the head pastor, Humberto Carrazana, and denied by the church board. Members of the Young Lords began regularly attending church services. During service on December 7, a confrontation over an attempt by Luciano to speak led to a violent altercation with police, resulting in the arrests of several Young Lords. After officials from other churches condemned the FSUMC's decision to involve police, Carrazana invited the Young Lords back to services, but subsequent meetings failed to resolve the tensions between the Young Lords and the FSUMC.

The Young Lords occupied the church on December 28, 1969, nailing the doors shut. During the occupation, the Young Lords implemented free breakfasts and health clinics, "liberation school" classes, and dinners for Puerto Rican women. Various celebrities visited the occupied church, including Budd Schulberg, Donald Sutherland, Elia Kazan, Gloria Steinem, Jane Fonda, Joe Bataan, Joe Cuba, José Torres, and Ray Barretto. Despite a court order to vacate, the Young Lords remained in the church, arguing they had not disrupted services and were instead challenging the church's inaction, and were held in contempt of court. The occupation ended when police forcibly entered the church, peacefully arresting 105 Young Lords members and supporters.

While the Young Lords continued to pressure the FSUMC to support their breakfast program, their requests were denied, though charges against them were dropped. However, the Church Offensive led to a surge in Young Lords membership and community support, amplified by significant media coverage and endorsements from prominent figures, which helped them to expand their influence, leading to the opening of a new Bronx branch of the Young Lords in April 1970.

=== Split from Chicago Young Lords ===
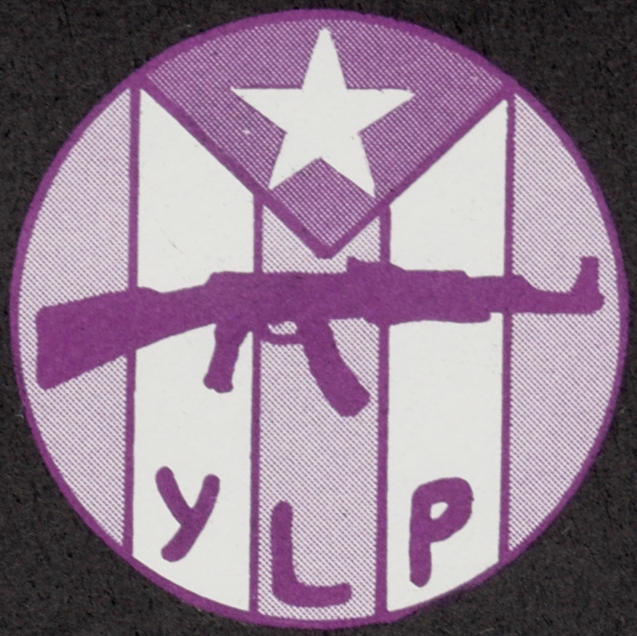
Young Lords Party logo

At a May 1970 retreat, divisions emerged between the New York and Chicago Young Lords. The New York leadership grew critical of the Chicago Young Lords' perceived lack of effective national direction, inconsistent leadership beyond Jiménez, failure to regularly produce the national newspaper, and lingering "gang culture" within the organization. As a result, the New York Young Lords proposed that the organization's Central Committee be temporarily relocated to New York. The Chicago Young Lords refused, and the New York Young Lords officially renamed themselves the "Young Lords Party" (YLP), discontinuing their relationship with the Chicago Young Lords. According to historian Johanna Fernández, The New York Times characterized the split as "amicable, sober, and without the usual acrimony associated with political faction fighting". Luciano was the chairman of the new organization.

=== Lincoln Offensive ===
In May 1970, to counter proposed budget cuts at Lincoln Hospital in the South Bronx, the YLP founded the "Think Lincoln Committee" (TLC) in collaboration with the Health Revolutionary Unity Movement (HRUM). At the time, Lincoln Hospital, known as the "butcher shop of the South Bronx", was an aging, severely overcrowded and poorly maintained facility characterized by its outdated infrastructure, lead paint, and reputation for inadequate care. The hospital experienced several reform efforts, including the development of a mental health program in collaboration with the Albert Einstein College of Medicine. However, these efforts ultimately faced funding shortfalls and administrative resistance that fueled worker discontent. The budget cuts proposed by the New York Health and Hospital Corporation (HHC), according to the TLC, would eliminate hospital jobs and restrict hours at one of the hospital's screening clinics.

The YLP occupied Lincoln Hospital on July 14. During the occupation, they offered screenings for anemia, iron deficiency, lead poisoning, and tuberculosis in the hospital lobby. They also set up a daycare and education center in the hospital's basement. At a morning press conference, they outlined their demands, including "no cutbacks" to employment or services, funding to complete and staff a new hospital, and self-determination of health services through a "community-worker board". After the press conference, the YLP began negotiations with the hospital's administrator and representatives from the mayor's office and the HHC. However, these negotiations were disrupted by reports that an undercover police officer had attempted to enter the building. That evening, the YLP secretly left the hospital with the assistance of resident physicians, ending the occupation after 12 hours.

Following the occupation, Conservative Party Senate candidate James L. Buckley condemned the occupiers, calling them "extremists". In August, after an altercation between TLC staff and a hospital administrator, the hospital pursued a restraining order against the HRUM, TLC, and TLP, claiming that they had "exceeded the ground rules". The restraining order was approved by the New York Supreme Court on August 26. Guzmán declared that the YLP would defy the order, claiming that "they had never been stopped by a piece of paper before". In November, the YLP occupied a section of the nurses' residence at the hospital, establishing a drug detoxification program and leading to the arrest of 15 occupiers. However, the program continued operation, treating as many as 600 people every week.

== Other chapters ==
In Connecticut, the Young Lords established chapters in both Bridgeport and New Haven. Puerto Ricans began settling in Connecticut as early as the mid-19th century, followed by a modest increase after the Spanish-American War and the Jones Act and a more significant increase spurred by job opportunities in factories, particularly during and after World War II. The Bridgeport chapter developed in 1970 from a merger between the Young Lords and a local organization, the Spanish People in Command. They organized a free breakfast program for children, as well as a rent strike among tenants on East Main Street, where they established their headquarters. (Note: According to Piascik, the strike began in December 1970. According to Flynn, it began in January 1971. Contemporary news coverage says that the strike lasted from January to May.) They ultimately failed to secure their demands and were evicted, leading to civil unrest in the city. In August 1971, a common pleas court overturned the Young Lords' eviction.

A Young Lords chapter was founded in Philadelphia, Pennsylvania, in 1970. The Puerto Rican community in Philadelphia began with merchants in the sugar trade and politically active cigar makers, later expanding significantly due to economic migration and job opportunities in various sectors, establishing the city as a major center for the population. The Philadelphia Young Lords, who also emerged from a local group, the Young Revolutionaries for Independence, were characterized by their Catholic faith and ties to religious institutions. They established free breakfast and clothing drives in the city, in addition to testing local residents for tuberculosis. Young Lords chapters were also founded in Boston, Massachusetts, as well as Hoboken, Jersey City, and Newark, New Jersey. At their peak, the Young Lords were estimated to have 1,000 members.

== Repression and decline ==
=== Organizational challenges ===
Throughout 1969, Jiménez and other members of the Young Lords leadership in Chicago were targeted by the city's gang intelligence unit for repeated detention and arrest. On July 30, Jiménez was sentenced to a year in Cook County Jail, allegedly for stealing lumber to help construct the daycare center at the Armitage Avenue Methodist Church. As a result, he resigned from his position as chairman of the Chicago Young Lords. Soon after, he went into hiding to avoid incarceration, establishing an "underground training school" to "train Young Lords leadership... to take over the organization". However, he turned himself in to police in September 1972. Young Lord Angie Navedo succeeded Jiménez as the organization's leader.

In September 1970, Luciano was demoted from his position as chairman of the YLP after an unauthorized twenty-seven-hour absence with another member. At the time, the YLP's security protocols were elevated after reports that organized crime groups had placed a "contract" on Luciano. The YLP remained active in late 1970. They acted as negotiators during the Attica Prison riot, which took place from September 9 to September 13, and collaborated with the Black Panthers to organize protests in support of Attica inmates. The riot ended when nearly 600 state troopers were called in to retake the prison. The troopers blanketed the prison yard with tear gas, then opened fire, leading to the deaths of 29 inmates and 10 guards.

Later, in October, YLP member Julio Roldán was arrested for allegedly attempting to start a fire in an apartment. He was sent to The Tombs, a men's prison in Manhattan, where he was later found hanged. At Roldán's funeral, the YLP staged a protest that culminated in a second, armed occupation of the FSUMC. To avoid confrontation or arrest after occupying the church, the Young Lords disassembled their firearms, enlisting neighborhood women to transport the components out of the church in their garments and handbags. The YLP also organized a "Free Puerto Rico Now" march to the Headquarters of the United Nations on October 30, 1970, the anniversary of the beginning of the Puerto Rican Nationalist Party insurgency. 10,000 people attended the march, demanding self-determination for Puerto Ricans both on the island and in the diaspora.

=== Expansion into Puerto Rico ===
The YLP expanded into Puerto Rico in 1971 in an effort spearheaded by Gloria Fontanez, the YLP's health captain. The expansion faced internal opposition from some members of the YLP, including Guzmán, Juan "Fi" Ortíz, and Denise Oliver-Velez. However, by the end of March, the YLP had devoted significant resources to relocating, with 20 members being transferred to the Puerto Rican branch. Despite a successful fundraising campaign for the expansion in New York, they experienced low turnout at their first demonstration on the island, a commemoration of the Ponce massacre. Established nationalist groups like the Movement Pro Independence (MPI), led by Juan Mari Brás, criticized their perceived arrogance and unfamiliarity with the local independence movement. Further efforts at expansion yielded minimal growth. They also faced logistical issues, including financial constraints and members' lack of fluency in Spanish. In June 1971, the YLP closed their offices in East Harlem and the Lower East Side.

In June 1972, after criticizing the YLP's activities in Puerto Rico, both Ortíz and fellow Young Lord Juan Ramos were expelled from the YLP. Soon after, Fontanez announced the closure of the YLP's Puerto Rican divisions and changed the name of the organization to the Puerto Rican Revolutionary Workers Organization (PRRWO). Some members of the organization split off to join the Partido Socialista Puertorriqueño (PSPR, transl. 'Puerto Rican Socialist Party'). The Chicago Young Lords ceased operations in 1972.

=== COINTELPRO ===
The Young Lords were targets of the FBI's COINTELPRO program, a counterintelligence initiative operated by the FBI from 1956 to 1971. Under the auspices of COINTELPRO, the FBI used covert, often illegal, tactics to disrupt and neutralize organizations it deemed threats to national security, including civil rights groups, leftist organizations, and minority activists. The FBI infiltrated and conducted surveillance on the Young Lords, intercepting their mail, recruiting informants, and disrupting relationships between the Young Lords and the Black Panthers. Young Lords member Iris Morales identified COINTELPRO influence as a key factor in the group's decline:

Police agents within the organization worked to intensify the differences and natural contradictions that existed among us. Intimidation tactics and beatings silenced opposition.

== Ideology and organization ==
Thirteen-Point Program

1. We want self-determination for Puerto Ricans—liberation on the island and inside the United States.
2. We want self-determination for all Latinos.
3. We want liberation of all third world people.
4. We are revolutionary nationalists and oppose racism.
5. We want community control of our institutions and land.
6. We want a true education of our Creole culture and Spanish language.
7. We oppose capitalists and alliances with traitors.
8. We oppose the Amerikkkan military.
9. We want freedom for all political prisoners.
10. We want equality for women. Machismo must be revolutionary... not oppressive.
11. We fight anti-communism with international unity.
12. We believe armed self-defense and armed struggle are the only means to liberation.
13. We want a socialist society.

— New York Young Lords, Palante, 1969, republished in The Young Lords: A Reader, ed. Darrel Enck-Wanzer (Note: This is an abridgment of the original text, which includes more detailed explanations for each point. For the full text, see The Young Lords: A Reader by Darrel Enck-Wanzer or this recreation of the text published by The Sixties Project.)

=== Organizational structure ===
Influenced by the Black Panthers, the Young Lords structured themselves as a vanguard party. In Marxism–Leninism, a vanguard party is a party of "professional revolutionaries" tasked with guiding the proletariat, or working class, toward revolutionary ends. The organization's governing body was known as the "Central Committee", a term commonly linked to communist administrative councils in countries like the Cuba, China, and the Soviet Union. The Central Committee consisted of a chairman, as well as chief ministers for defense, education, finance, and information. Beginning in July 1969, the Central Committee convened regularly in both private and public sessions to assess operations and define organizational objectives.

After the Church Offensive, the Young Lords established recruitment screening protocols to evaluate prospective members. Under this system, those interested in joining the organization became "friends of the Lords". They then underwent a six-week trial period designed to test their commitment and identify potential spies as a "Lord in training". Finally, once the trial was complete, they would become "cadre". Members of the Young Lords lived a communal lifestyle, often living together and committing themselves fully to the organization's activities. These generally included community work, political education, physical training, and fundraising.

=== Ideology and beliefs ===
Young Lords Party (YLP) poster, 1971

The Young Lords, in their Thirteen-Point Program, expressed support for Puerto Rican independence, third-world liberation, revolutionary nationalism, and socialism. Leaders subscribed to Marxist, Leninist, Maoist, and Guevarist principles. While they supported Puerto Rican independence and opposed United States imperialism, the Young Lords condemned purely cultural nationalist approaches as "pork chop nationalism", (Note: In a 1968 interview, Huey P. Newton, founder of the Black Panthers, used the terms "pork chop nationalism" to describe cultural nationalism. The exact origin of the phrase is unclear, but Wright posits that it might derive from an expression used by members of the Industrial Workers of the World, or "Wobblies". Per Wright, in Wobbly vernacular, a "pork chop" was a person who "chase[d] madly after [their] next supper instead of uniting with the rest of the hungry and chasing after the owners of the pig farms".) insufficient to address the systemic exploitation faced by their communities. Instead, the Young Lords viewed Puerto Rican independence as being inextricably linked to the overthrow of capitalism and the establishment of a socialist society. They also viewed racism in the United States as a form of "internal colonialism", arguing that the oppressed had to actively "take" freedom, which would not be otherwise given to them.

The Young Lords criticized antiblack racism in particular as "a kind of false consciousness, in the Marxist sense, meant to disorient people who share common objective interests", according to Fernández. While the leadership of many contemporary Puerto Rican organizations was primarily white, the Young Lords were notable for their inclusion of Black members. Many members of the leadership were Black, and it is estimated that Black people constituted 25–30% of the organization's total membership. The Young Lords organized various educational campaigns to address racism within the Puerto Rican community, with articles published in Palante discussing the history of Black and indigenous society in the Caribbean.

==== Gender and sexuality ====
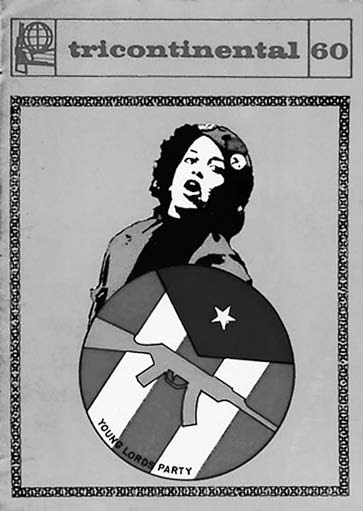
Tricontinental magazine cover depicting a female member of the Young Lords Party (YLP)

Initially, gender was not a priority for the Young Lords. Women in the organization were often poorly treated. In many cases, they were expected to perform menial labor, and they were unable to pursue leadership roles within the organization. After the Church Offensive, female membership substantially increased, with women comprising 35–40% of members by January 1970. When the women of the New York Young Lords began meeting on Sundays, however, members of the Central Committee referred to it as "hen talk". As women pushed for greater representation in the organization, they met with opposition from some male members, who viewed the "women's issue" as divisive.

In May 1970, a group of women in the organization issued an ultimatum to the Central Committee, demanding the creation of men's, women's, and gay caucuses; formal opposition to sexist behavior; the revision of the Thirteen-Point Program; and greater women's representation in leadership roles. As a result, the tenth point of the Thirteen-Point program was modified to say "Down with Machismo and Male Chauvinism", becoming the fifth point of the revised program. Furthermore, the Central Committee initiated a reeducation campaign aimed at "challeng[ing] men and women to defy socially prescribed gender roles". Women were also represented on the Central Committee and in other leadership roles. However, according to Johanna Fernández, sexism within the organization continued to be a point of contention.

Historical accounts differ regarding the Young Lords' position on LGBTQ rights. Historian Lilia Fernández states that the "YLP did not object to the participation of gay, lesbian, bisexual, or transgender activists". According to Lilia, Sylvia Rivera, founder of the organization Street Transvestite Action Revolutionaries (STAR), was a member of the YLP. Johanna Fernández states that while the Young Lords made attempts to build alliances with LGBTQ advocates, LGBTQ issues were "shrouded in taboo". Per Johanna, Rivera was a "friendly traveler" to the Young Lords, and sought their assistance as bodyguards for a period as a result of death threats she received after reporting a guard's assault on an inmate in The Tombs.

== Legacy ==
=== Commemoration ===
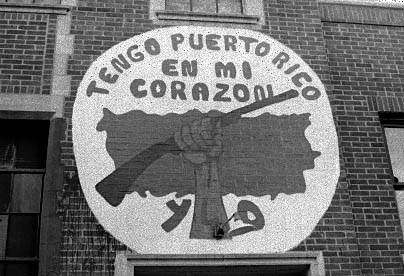
Young Lords logo painted on a wall, 2003

A documentary about the Young Lords entitled ¡Palante Siempre Palante! (transl. 'Onward Always Onward!') and directed by Iris Morales aired on the Public Broadcasting Service (PBS) in 1996. Later, in 2001, archival materials from the Young Lords' newspapers were donated to DePaul University, with a portion later digitized. In 2019, an exhibit documenting the Young Lords' activities entitled ¡Presente! The Young Lords in New York was displayed in three museums—the Bronx Museum of the Arts, El Museo del Barrio, and Loisaida Inc—highlighting their community work, the significance of their newspaper Palante, and the role of women in the organization. The exhibit featured photographs by Hiram Maristany, archival materials, and artwork. Maristany's photographs of the Young Lords were featured again in 2019 in the exhibition Mapping Resistance: The Young Lords in El Barrio, which was curated by artist Miguel Luciano and displayed across multiple East Harlem locations.

=== Historiography ===
Scholars have presented multiple perspectives on the historical significance of the Young Lords. Wanzer-Serrano argues that the Young Lords' central demand for "community control" was rooted in a "retrofitted memory" that connected their activism to a history of resistance against Spanish colonization. He argues that the Young Lords, in formulating these demands, drew inspiration from Black power advocates, decolonial theorists like Frantz Fanon, and a broader community control movement in New York City. Per Wanzer-Serrano, the "community control" rhetoric of the Young Lords, exemplified by actions like the Garbage and Church Offensives, aimed to "denaturalize" colonized spaces like East Harlem and offer an alternative to the universalizing tendencies of both modernity and colonialism.

Despite their relatively short existence, Johanna Fernández argues that the Young Lords' "dizzying pace of organizing" led to tangible reforms. This view is shared by Iris Morales, who states that actions like the Garbage Offensive showed that the Young Lords were "street fighters willing to confront the police and government authority to get results". Fernández also argues that the Young Lords' activities challenge the traditional focus on white students and a narrowly defined "New Left" as the central drivers of 1960s radical movements. In Fernández's view, as a revolutionary organization led by people of color, the Young Lords, like the Black Panthers, helped to popularize socialism in the United States.

==== Cultural impact ====
Academic José Ramón Sánchez argues that the Young Lords were crucial to the emergence of "Puerto Rican community power" after the 1960s. According to Sánchez, while direct engagement between Puerto Ricans and society at large declined during this period, the actions of the Young Lords empowered moderates and reduced the dominance of prevailing social values, ultimately leaving a complex legacy of both increased independence and withdrawal. Furthermore, Sánchez argues that many second- and third-generation Puerto Ricans, who were raised during the period when the Young Lords were active, took a more oppositional stance to white American society.

Meanwhile, academic Urayoán Noel argues that the Young Lords' communal and performative approach to politics influenced the development of Nuyorican cultural spaces in New York, including the Nuyorican Poets Café. Johanna Fernández also states that the Young Lords helped shape Nuyorican identity through the creation of spaces like the People's Church, where Puerto Rican arts and music, including stigmatized Afro-diasporic forms like bomba y plena, were celebrated. According to Fernández, this embrace of Puerto Rican heritage, combined with the emergence of Nuyorican artists like Pedro Pietri, helped to catalyze a distinct Nuyorican cultural and political consciousness.

== Sources ==
- Agusto-DaFonseca, Gustavo; Henken, Ted (2008). "East Harlem". In Schaefer, Richard T. (ed.). Encyclopedia of Race, Ethnicity, and Society. Vol. 1. Chicago: Sage. pp. 429–431. ISBN 978-1-4129-2694-2.
- Beliz, Crisol G. (2015). "'They Do Not Treat Us Like Human Beings': Latino-Police Relations in 1960's Chicago". McNair Scholars Journal. 19 (1): 6–16.
- Cabán, Pedro (2005). "COINTELPRO". In Oboler, Suzanne; González, Deena J. (eds.). The Oxford Encyclopedia of Latinos and Latinas in the United States. New York: Oxford University Press. pp. 366–369. ISBN 978-0-19-515600-3.
- Demaree-Raboteau, Julia (2011). "Emmaus House and Orthodoxy: Living with the Poor". Sophia Institute Studies in Orthodox Theology. 2: 327–331. doi:10.7916/D85M6G2R.
- Enck-Wanzer, Darrel, ed. (2010). The Young Lords: A Reader. New York; London: New York University Press. ISBN 978-0-8147-2241-1.
- Extent of Subversion in the "New Left": Testimony of Hugh Patrick Feely and Harry F. Port, Jr., August 3, 1970 (Senate hearing). United States Senate Committee on the Judiciary. 1970.
- Fernández, Johanna (2011). "The Young Lords and the Social and Structural Roots of Late Sixties Urban Radicalism". In Taylor, Clarence (ed.). Civil Rights in New York City: From World War II to the Giuliani Era. New York: Fordham University Press. pp. 141–160. doi:10.2307/j.ctt13wzxr4.11. ISBN 978-0-8232-4087-6. JSTOR j.ctt13wzxr4.11.
- Fernández, Johanna (2020). The Young Lords: A Radical History. Chapel Hill: University of North Carolina Press. ISBN 978-1-4696-5345-7.
- Fernández, Lilia (2012). Brown in the Windy City: Mexicans and Puerto Ricans in Postwar Chicago. Chicago: The University of Chicago Press. ISBN 9780226212845.
- Fernández, Lilia (2018). "Founding of the Young Lords, 1968–1972". In Fernández, Lilia (ed.). 50 Events That Shaped Latino History: An Encyclopedia of the American Mosaic. Vol. 2. Santa Barbara: ABC-CLIO. pp. 625–641. ISBN 978-1-4408-4904-6.
- Flynn, Elizabeth M. (1973). Puerto Ricans in the East Side of Bridgeport: Two Opposing Points of View (Thesis).
- Georgakas, Dan (1990). "Vanguard Party". In Buhle, Mari Jo; Buhle, Paul; Georgakas, Dan (eds.). Encyclopedia of the American Left. New York; London: Garland. pp. 813–814. ISBN 0-8240-3713-8.
- Glasser, Ruth (2005). "From 'Rich Port' to Bridgeport: Puerto Ricans in Connecticut". In Whalen, Carmen Teresa; Vázquez-Hernández, Victor (eds.). Puerto Rican Diaspora: Historical Perspectives. Philadelphia: Temple University Press. pp. 174–199. ISBN 1-59213-412-2. JSTOR j.ctt14bt09b.11.
- Gonzales, Michael (2019). "'Latin Power to Latin People': the Black Panther Party's Influence on the Revolutionary Politics of the Young Lords Organization". Journal of African American Studies. 23 (4): 335–351. doi:10.1007/s12111-019-09439-5.
- Guzmán, Pablo (1998). "La Vida Pura: A Lord of the Barrio". In Torres, Andrés (ed.). The Puerto Rican Movement: Voices from the Diaspora. Philadelphia: Temple University Press. pp. 155–172. ISBN 1-56639-617-4.
- Hinojosa, Felipe (2021). Apostles of Change: Latino Radical Politics, Church Occupations, and the Fight to Save the Barrio. Austin: University of Texas Press. doi:10.7560/321980. ISBN 978-1-4773-2201-7.
- Jeffries, Judson (2003). "From Gang-Bangers to Urban Revolutionaries: The Young Lords of Chicago". Journal of the Illinois State Historical Society. 95 (3): 288–304. JSTOR 40193998.
- Jiménez, José (2012). The Young Lords in Lincoln Park (Thesis). Grand Valley State University.
- Lerner, B.H. (1993). "New York City's tuberculosis control efforts: the historical limitations of the 'war on consumption'". American Journal of Public Health. 85 (5): 758–766. doi:10.2105/ajph.83.5.758. PMC 1694703. PMID 8484467.
- Morales, Iris (dir.) (1996). Palante, Siempre Palante! (documentary). New York: Third World Newsreel.
- Morales, Iris (1998). "¡PALANTE, SIEMPRE PALANTE!: The Young Lords". In Torres, Andrés (ed.). The Puerto Rican Movement: Voices from the Diaspora. Philadelphia: Temple University Press. pp. 210–227. ISBN 1-56639-617-4.
- Morris, Jessica; Keller, Monica (2021). "Rivera, Sylvia". In Goldberg, Abbie E.; Beemyn, Genny (eds.). The SAGE Encyclopedia of Trans Studies. Vol. 2. Amherst: SAGE. pp. 742–744. ISBN 978-1-5443-9381-0.
- Negrón-Muntaner, Frances (2015). "The Look of Sovereignty: Style and Politics in the Young Lords". Centro Journal. 27 (1): 4–33. ProQuest 1704739824.
- Noel, Urayoán (2014). "On Out of Focus Nuyoricans, Noricuas, and Performance Identities" (PDF). Liminalities. 10 (3/4).
- Rivera, Marisol V.; Jeffries, Judson (2019). "From Radicalism to Representation: Jose 'Cha Cha' Jimenez's Journey into Electoral Politics". Journal of African American Studies. 23 (4): 299–319. doi:10.1007/s12111-019-09446-6.
- Rúa, Mérida M. (2012). A Grounded Identidad: Making New Lives in Chicago's Puerto Rican Neighborhoods. Oxford; New York: Oxford University Press. doi:10.1093/acprof:oso/9780199760268.001.0001. ISBN 978-0-19-976026-8.
- Sánchez, José Ramón (2007). Boricua Power: A Political History of Puerto Ricans in the United States. New York; London: New York University Press. ISBN 978-0-8147-9847-8.
- Sánchez Korrol, Virginia E. (1994). From Colonia to Community: The History of Puerto Ricans in New York City. Berkeley; Los Angeles: University of California Press. ISBN 978-0-520-07900-7.
- Thompson, Heather Ann (2014). "Lessons from Attica: From Prisoner Rebellion to Mass Incarceration and Back". Socialism and Democracy. 28 (3): 153–171. doi:10.1080/08854300.2014.963944.
- Wanzer-Serrano, Darrel (2015). The New York Young Lords and the Struggle for Liberation. Philadelphia: Temple University Press. ISBN 978-1-4399-1204-1.
- Whalen, Carmen Teresa (1998). "Bridging Homeland and Barrio Politics: The Young Lords in Philadelphia". In Torres, Andrés (ed.). The Puerto Rican Movement: Voices from the Diaspora. Philadelphia: Temple University Press. pp. 107–123. ISBN 1-56639-617-4.
- Whalen, Carmen Teresa (2005). "Colonialism, Citizenship, and the Making of the Puerto Rican Diaspora: An Introduction". In Whalen, Carmen Teresa; Vázquez-Hernández, Victor (eds.). Puerto Rican Diaspora: Historical Perspectives. Philadelphia: Temple University Press. ISBN 1-59213-412-2. JSTOR j.ctt14bt09b.11.
- Wright, Stephanie (2017). "Black is Beautiful, but Pork is Poison: Soul Food, Black Power, and the (Not So) Symbolic Violence of Taste". Taste and the Exclusionary Mechanisms of Cultural Consumption. UCSB Art History Graduate Symposium. University of California, Santa Barbara.
- Young, Kurt B. (2011). "Untrapping the Soul of Fanon: Culture, Consciousness and the Future of Pan-Africanism" (PDF). The Journal of Pan African Studies. 4 (7): 137–161.
