= Hiram Maristany =

American photographer (1945–2022)

- Born: August 10, 1945
- Died: March 10, 2022 (aged 76)
- Known for: photography

Hiram Sebastian Maristany (August 10, 1945 – March 10, 2022) was a Nuyorican American photographer, and director of El Museo del Barrio from 1975 to 1977. He was known for his association with, and documentation of, the Young Lords chapter in Harlem, which he co-founded in 1969. His work has been included in museums such as MoMA PS1 and he held a residency at the Metropolitan Museum of Art.

He had a son, Pablo, and a daughter, Alita. Maristany died on March 10, 2022, at the age of 76.

== Early life ==
Maristany was born in Manhattan's Spanish Harlem neighborhood to Puerto Rican immigrant parents Reinaldo and Margarita Maristany. At a young age, Maristany lost his father, an event which some who knew him believe forced him to mature faster than usual. Some suggest this lack of childhood contributed to his motivation to document the life of his neighborhood. At age 13, he received his first camera from social worker Dan Murrow, who suggested photography may help him.

== Community involvement ==
By 18, Maristany was a known figure in his community. Prior to the founding of the Young Lords chapter, he was part of an antipoverty program called the Photography Workshop, funded by Columbia University's Teachers College's Social Research Center. His workshop was located on 117th street, in the heart of Spanish Harlem.

In 1969, Maristany co-founded El Museo del Barrio along with artist and educator Raphael Montañez Ortiz. In September 1971, he established the Amigos del Museo del Barrio nonprofit, facilitating the museum's community outreach programs, along with Moreno Vega, Eugene Calderon, and Hilda Arroyo. From April 1975 through July 1977, he served as the museum's acting director.

== Involvement in The Young Lords Party ==
=== Founding ===
Maristany co-founded the Young Lords Organization's (YLO) New York chapter in May 1969, becoming their official photographer. Other founding members, such as former Young Lords chairman Felipe Luciano, credit him with providing transportation to a Students for Democratic Society convention in Chicago. There, the men requested and were granted permission from YLO founding member Jose "Cha-Cha" Jimenez to establish the New York chapter. By 1970, the New York chapter had renamed itself to the Young Lords' Party (YLP), further distinguishing itself from the Chicago group.

== Exhibitions ==
- Maristany's work was included in the 2025 exhibition Photography and the Black Arts Movement, 1955–1985 at the National Gallery of Art.
- ¡PRESENTE! The Young Lords in New York (July 22, 2015 – December 12, 2015) at the El Museo del Barrio.
- Down These Mean Streets (May 11, 2017 – August 5, 2017) at the Smithsonian American Art Museum.
