= La Clark =

Puerto Rican neighborhood in Chicago, Illinois

- Neighborhood
- Location within the city of Chicago La Clark (Illinois) La Clark (the United States)
- Coordinates: 41°54′11.2″N 87°38′17.6″W
- Country: United States
- State: Illinois
- County: Cook
- City: Chicago

La Clark was a neighborhood in Chicago, Illinois, settled by people of Puerto Rican descent between the 1930s and 1960s. It encompassed an area from Grand Avenue in the south, Armitage Avenue and Clark Street in the north, Dearborn Street in the east, and Halsted Street in the west, except along Chicago Avenue, where it extended to Ashland Avenue. It was divided between the modern-day Near North Side and Lincoln Park community areas and contained parts of the modern-day Old Town and River North neighborhoods, among others.

== History ==
Puerto Ricans began migrating to Chicago in the 1920s. In the 1930s and 40s, a Puerto Rican enclave was established near 47th Street and Michigan Avenue. La Clark emerged as a Puerto Rican community in the 1940s, supported by the arrival of several groups of migrants, including University of Chicago graduate enrollees and industrial contract laborers. La Clark was characterized by its subdivided boarding houses and hotels. Its population was primarily working class. Rents were generally low, but insect and rat infestations were common.

In the early 1950s, La Clark was subject to an urban renewal campaign organized by Mayor Richard J. Daley, with local landlords increasing rents and distributing notices to Puerto Rican residents asking them to move. Over 900 Puerto Rican families were displaced from the La Clark area during the 1950s and 1960s to make way for the construction of the Carl Sandburg Village. Most moved to the Lincoln Park and Wicker Park neighborhoods. Among the displaced was the family of José "Cha Cha" Jiménez, founder of the Young Lords.

== See also ==
- Puerto Ricans in Chicago
- Young Lords

== Sources ==
- Fernández, Johanna (2020). The Young Lords: A Radical History. Chapel Hill: The University of North Carolina Press. ISBN 978-1-4696-5345-7.
- Flores-Rodríguez, Ángel G. (2022). "On National Turf: The Rise of the Young Lords Organization and its Struggle for the Nation in Chicago". Op. Cit. Revista Del Centro De Investigaciones Históricas. 20: 105–141.
- Jeffries, Judson (2003). "From Gang-Bangers to Urban Revolutionaries: The Young Lords of Chicago". Journal of the Illinois State Historical Society. 95 (3): 288–304.
- Jiménez, José (2012). The Young Lords in Lincoln Park (Thesis). Grand Valley State University.
- Rúa, Mérida M. (2012). A Grounded Identidad: Making New Lives in Chicago's Puerto Rican Neighborhoods. Oxford; New York: Oxford University Press. doi:10.1093/acprof:oso/9780199760268.001.0001. ISBN 978-0-19-976026-8.
