= Johanna Fernández (historian) =

American historian and activist (1970–2026)

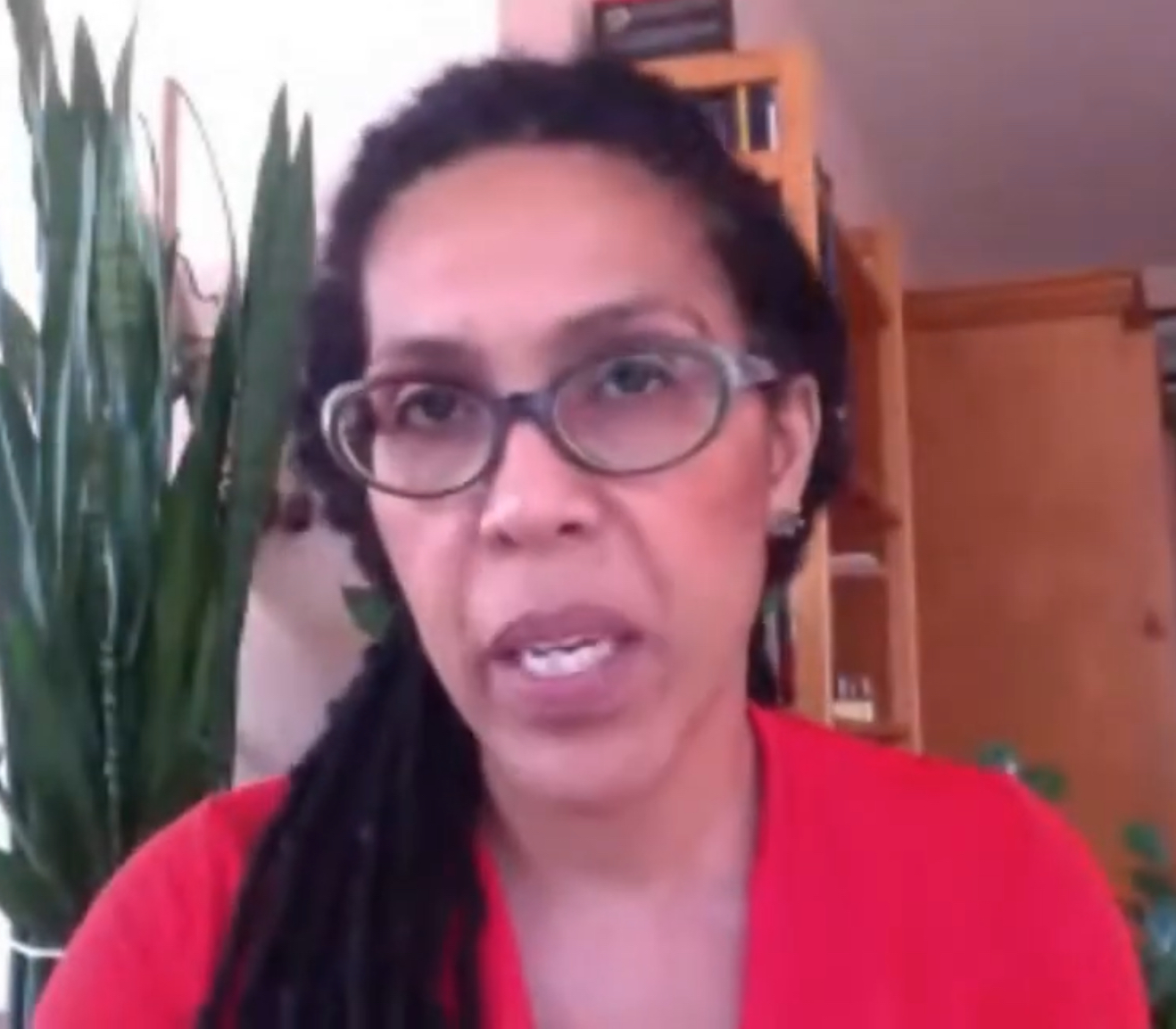
- Fernández in 2020
- Born: December 2, 1970; New York City, U.S.
- Died: July 30, 2026 (aged 55); New York City, U.S.
- Education: Brown University, Columbia University
- Occupations: Historian, professor
- Notable work: The Young Lords: A Radical History (2019)
- Website: www.johannafernandez.info

Johanna Luisa del Carmen Fernández (December 2, 1970 – July 30, 2026) was an American historian, police/prison abolitionist and revolutionary socialist. An associate professor of history at Baruch College, her academic work has centered on the Young Lords, culminating in The Young Lords: A Radical History (2019). Since its publication, she worked on a book about the history of fascism in the United States and co-curated the first exhibit at the National Museum of the American Latino in 2022.

Her activism began in 1991 as a leader of Students for Admissions and Minority Aid (SAMA) at Brown University. As an advocate for need-blind admission and affirmative action, she participated in the April 22–23, 1992 occupation of University Hall. Her 21st-century activism has primarily centered around the Free Mumia Abu-Jamal campaign. In this endeavor, she produced the film Justice on Trial (2010), co-edited a special issue of Socialism and Democracy with Abu-Jamal, and edited a collection of his works titled Writing on the Wall (2015).

== Life and career ==
=== Early life and education ===
On December 2, 1970, Fernández was born in New York City to Dominican refugees of the Dominican Civil War. She grew up in an apartment in The Bronx. Living in a Spanish-speaking-only household, she attended bilingual classes for the first three years of elementary school. However, since their establishment in the 1960s due to the activism of Evelina López Antonetty and others, they were stigmatized. In defiance, she became determined "to master the English language", birthing an interest in literature that remained influential into college. She did not have English proficiency until sixth grade, reading her first book, East of Eden (1952), around that time. She attended Murry Bergtraum High School her freshman and sophomore years, but in response to her truancy there her father transferred her to the Manhattan Center for Science and Mathematics. There she enrolled in Columbia University's Double Discovery Program. Despite her parents not being overtly political, she developed anti-capitalist sentiments from encounters with poverty and the crack epidemic in New York, comparing it to better environments in the Dominican Republic she visited during the summers. In 1988, she graduated from Charterhouse School in Godalming, England, in a year-long program organized by the British American Educational Foundation. She toured Europe, including a visit to the Soviet Union, where the visible poverty left her with a negative impression of Soviet socialism.

Although she wished to attend Wesleyan University, she was only accepted to Brown University. There she was influenced academically by classes under Dorothy Denniston and Suzanne Oboler. Additionally, she has labeled studying postmodernism as "the most important intellectual experience of my life". Moreover, she explored her Afro-Dominican and lesbian identity during her early years at Brown. Coming from a family making $22,000 annually, she became a leader of Students for Admissions and Minority Aid (SAMA) her junior year, advocating for need-blind admission and affirmative action and joining teach-ins. When attempts to collaborate with President Vartan Gregorian on allocating $50 million for financial aid failed, she participated in the April 22–23, 1992 occupation of University Hall. While the initial group was under guard, she went to the bathroom and delivered a speech through a window facing approximately 400 students on the ground. The Brown Daily Herald quotes her at one point saying, "There are people out there who can't come in because they don't have money. The Van Wickle Gates are locked to them." She and other speakers prompted students to storm the building. Once police arrived outside the campus, she was committed to being arrested rather than acceding to vacating the building. Accordingly, she was one of the 253 arrestees. However, by the time SAMA activists had gone through court, which for Fernández resulted in a fine, the semester ended and students demobilized. In 1993, she graduated with a bachelor's degree of arts in literature and American civilization.

Having been exposed to Marxism and becoming an adherent at Brown, by the time she went to Columbia University for graduate studies she was a revolutionary socialist that referred to Mumia Abu-Jamal as the "Che Guevara of our era". Influenced by her activist experience at Brown she studied social movements and graduated with a PhD in history in 2004. As a postdoctoral fellow at Carnegie Mellon University, she attended a lecture by activist and former Black Panther Elaine Brown, whom she spontaneously introduced in light of students' unpreparedness. Afterward, professor emeritus David P. Demarest suggested she visit Abu-Jamal, whom she began seeing weekly along with other death row inmates at State Correctional Institution – Greene. The "transformative" experience influenced her approach to prison abolition.

=== Post-graduate work and activism ===
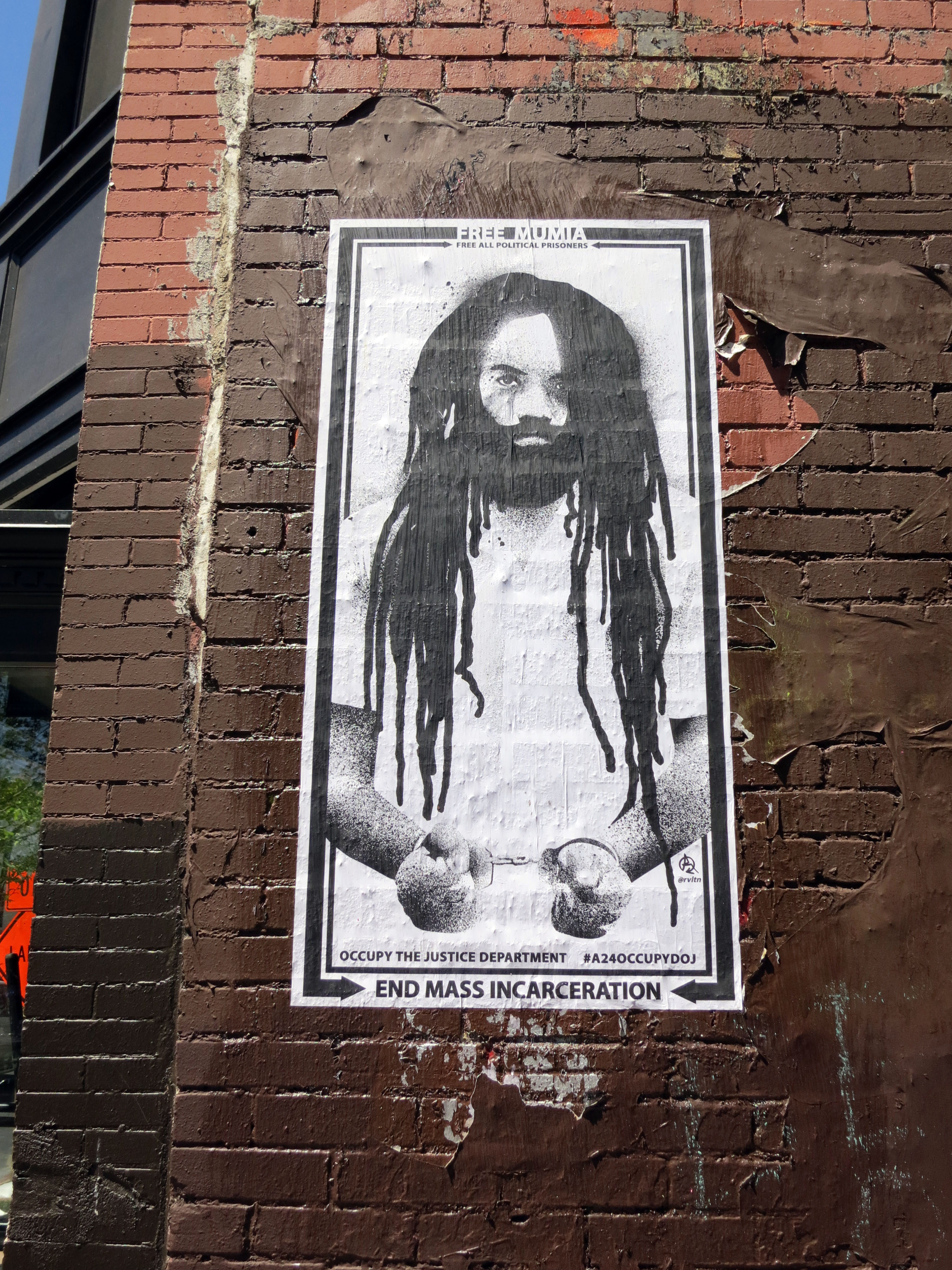
Free Mumia street poster, 2012

Fernández's and Kouross Esmaeli's film Justice on Trial (2010) sympathetically covered the details of Abu-Jamal's case. Author Robert Zaller notes that the film's point "is not how exceptional Mumia's trial was, but how typical. The film details the runaway corruption and brutality of Philadelphia's police force under Mayor Frank Rizzo in the 1970s, and the hand-in-glove collaboration of the District Attorney's Office with it. … Nor, as the film points out, is the system much improved today. Every few years brings renewed scandal. The Fraternal Order of Police (FOP) remains as resistant to reform as ever, and no mayor, police commissioner, or D.A. has dared to confront its culture of impunity." It was contrasted to Tigre Hill's anti-Mumia documentary The Barrel of a Gun (2010). In November she debated Hill and R. Seth Williams following a showing of The Barrel of a Gun characterized by a vocally pro-Mumia audience. In 2014, she co-edited a special issue of Socialism and Democracy with Abu-Jamal on mass incarceration in the United States. The following year, a collection of works edited by Fernández entitled Writing on the Wall was published. Her expressed goal "was to place Mumia in the context of the Black radical tradition".

1970 Young Lords platform poster, held at the Smithsonian Institution

Following the completion of her Columbia doctoral dissertation on the Young Lords, she further examined the work of the organization's photographers, specifically Hiram Maristany (New York City) and Luis Avila (Chicago). She then integrated these in lectures. During one on the southern civil rights movement at the Bronx Museum, an audience member asked about the participation of Latinos, leading to an explanation of the Young Lords and Holly Block inviting her to curate an exhibit. In 2015, she co-curated with Yasmín Ramírez "¡Presente! The Young Lords in New York", which was presented at the Bronx Museum of the Arts, El Museo del Barrio, and Losaida Inc. Art critic Holland Cotter's New York Times review provides background, particularly for the portions of the exhibition pertaining to the Garbage and Church Offensives.

In 2014, she made a Freedom of Information Act request to the New York City Police Department (NYPD) for 1960s—1970s surveillance files ordered to be preserved by the Handschu agreement, but was led on for 6 months before being informed the NYPD was dismissing her FOIA request. She borrowed money, hired attorney Gideon Oliver, and sued the NYPD. In 2016, +1 million documents dated 1954–1972 were found in the Queens Warehouse and covered the Young Lords, Black Panther Party, Hard Hat Riot, and 1968 Columbia University protests. Her subsequent book, The Young Lords: A Radical History (2019), was well received by the press and academia.

During racial unrest in summer 2020, she helped coordinate the June 14 Puerto Rican pride and solidarity march with Black Lives Matter. It involved 60 organizations and drew 5,000 people. Protesting against police brutality and Immigration and Customs Enforcement (ICE), she stated, "I have been dreaming of this moment. Black and Brown people are sharing their history of the colonial experience and class struggle." She pinpoints American police origins to slave catching and declared, "White supremacy is part of the DNA in America. It cannot be reformed. It has to be abolished."

In collaboration with historian Felipe Hinojosa, she began curating the inaugural exhibit, "¡Presente!", on 20th-century Latino youth movements for the National Museum of the American Latino in July 2021. However, it was "paused" in November 2022 shortly after opening at the National Museum of American History over political backlash. An opinion article in The Hill criticized it as "advancing a classic oppressor-oppressed agenda of textbook Marxism". Florida Republican representative Mario Diaz-Balart in reaction stated he would block funding. Director Jorge Zamanillo explained that continuing the exhibit's direction was not financially viable and that the research could be utilized later. Following Zamanillo's meeting with Diaz-Balart and Texas Republican Tony Gonzales, material on a 1992 Cuban post-revolution exodus raft including language on Cuba's "dictatorship" was added. Diaz-Balart and Gonzales deemed this and similar changes sufficient in changing their view, yet Zamanillo maintained no changes were agreed upon. However, historian Vicki L. Ruiz, Fernández, and Hinojosa stated concessions undermined relationships established with living historical subjects.

Fernández curated the Latinx Freedom Movement Archive and Exhibition Project with historian Felipe Hinojosa, which was displayed at The Shed.

She wrote a book about the history of fascism in the United States.

=== Death ===
Fernández died from lung cancer on July 30, 2026, at the age of 55. At the time of her death, she was working with Mickey Melendez and Cionin Lorenzo to develop a scripted miniseries about the Young Lords.

== Works ==
=== Books ===
- Abu-Jamal, Mumia; Fernández, Johanna; West, Cornel (2015). Writing on the wall: selected prison writings of Mumia Abu-Jamal. San Francisco: City Lights books. ISBN 978-0-87286-675-1.
- The Young Lords: A Radical History. Chapel Hill: University of North Carolina Press. 2019. p. 480. ISBN 978-1469669328.

=== Articles ===
- "On the Historical Roots of U.S. Fascism". Critical Ethnic Studies. 7 (1). January 7, 2022. doi:10.5749/CES.0701.Fernandez. ISSN 2373-504X.

== See also ==
- Neoabolitionism (race relations)
- Nuyorican movement
