= Church Offensive =

Building occupation in New York City

- Date: December 28, 1969 – January 7, 1970
- Location: East Harlem, New York City, U.S.
- Caused by: Rejection of the Young Lords' request to host their free breakfast program by the First Spanish United Methodist Church
- Result: Arrest of Young Lords; Increased media coverage for Young Lords; Increase in Young Lords membership

Parties
New York Young Lords: Young Lords supporters	First Spanish United Methodist Church (FSUMC): New York City Police Department

Lead figures
Felipe Luciano	Humberto Carrazana

The Church Offensive was a building occupation organized by the New York Young Lords in East Harlem, New York City, United States. During the Church Offensive, the Young Lords occupied the First Spanish United Methodist Church (FSUMC) for 11 days, from December 28, 1969, to January 7, 1970, in protest of the church's refusal to host the Young Lords' free breakfast program. During the occupation, the Young Lords implemented various community service programs, including free breakfasts and health clinics, "liberation school" classes, and dinners for Puerto Rican women. Despite a court order to vacate the church, the Young Lords remained, arguing they had not disrupted services and were challenging the church's inaction. As a result, they were held in contempt of court. The occupation ended when police forcibly entered the church, peacefully arresting 105 Young Lords members and supporters.

The Young Lords continued to pressure the FSUMC to support their breakfast program, but their requests were denied. Despite this, due to media coverage and endorsements from prominent figures, the Church Offensive led to an increase in community support and membership for the Young Lords. Some historians argue that the Church Offensive revitalized the Puerto Rican independence movement in New York and fostered discussions about gender roles within the growing Young Lords organization. Others claim that the Church Offensive represented a challenge to the "social imaginary" by questioning prevailing Western concepts of peoplehood and disrupting the perceived link between coloniality and modernity.

== History ==
Location of the First Spanish United Methodist Church (FSUMC) in Manhattan

=== Background ===
The Young Lords, originally a Puerto Rican street gang operating in Chicago, Illinois, shifted to become a civil rights organization during the 1960s. The New York chapter of the Young Lords—formed from the merger of the Lower East Side Young Lords; (Note: One source, Jeffries, claims that the first chapter of the new York Young Lords was in East Harlem. However, two sources, Wanzer-Serrano and Fernández, claim that it was on the Lower East Side.) the Photography Workshop, an activist-oriented arts organization; and the Sociedad Albizu Campos, a reading group based at the State University of New York at Old Westbury—was established on July 26, 1969. The New York Young Lords primarily organized in East Harlem, and offered various community service programs to the community, including a free breakfast program for children.

In October 1969, the Young Lords' free breakfast program was expelled from its location at Emmaus House, an Eastern Orthodox social housing community, due to police reports claiming that the Young Lords were affiliated with local gangs. They subsequently requested space from the First Spanish United Methodist Church (FSUMC), which is located in the center of East Harlem, but were dismissed by the head pastor, Humberto Carrazana, and denied by the church board. Members of the Young Lords began regularly attending church services, and tensions between the Young Lords and the church's leader escalated.

=== Escalation ===
During the informal "Loyalty Sunday" service on December 7, when congregants traditionally share testimonies and make yearly financial pledges, Luciano attempted to give a speech to the congregation outlining the Young Lords' request for space. Carrazana motioned for the church's organist to play, causing a member of the Young Lords to move to unplug the organ. An undercover police officer, Victor Badilla, attempted to deescalate the situation by offering the Young Lords speaking time if they vacated the pulpit, but Carrazana shouted that Luciano "should not be allowed to speak", causing Badilla to call in reinforcements. At the same time, another police officer stepped forward, threatening the Young Lords with arrest. This led to a violent altercation between the Young Lords and the police, with five Young Lords and three or four police officers sustaining injuries. (Note: Police stated that four officers sustained injuries, according to Fernández. However, according to Wanzer-Serrano, only three police officers were injured.) 13 or 14 members of the Young Lords were arrested, including Luciano. (Note: 13 according to Fernández and 14 according to Wanzer-Serrano.)

After officials from other churches condemned the FSUMC's decision to involve police, Carrazana invited the Young Lords to attend service again on December 14. Roughly 500 individuals, primarily Young Lords supporters, attended the service, with Carrazana inviting a Young Lords delegation to meet with him afterwards. However, some congregants in attendance at the meeting disparaged Puerto Ricans in the community as indolent and wasteful, and the meeting ultimately failed to yield results. A group of 150, including both members of the Young Lords and supporters, attended service once again on December 21. After the service, Luciano spoke outside the church, expressing anger at the congregants of the church for "turn[ing] their backs on young people".

=== Occupation ===
It's just incredible to us how a simple thing like a request to grant a space has resulted in so much trouble in East Harlem. Our only understanding of it is that religion, organized religion has so enslaved our people, has so destroyed their minds in thinking of salvation in the hereafter, that they refuse to deal with the conditions they have now and the oppression they have now... It's amazing to us how people can talk about Jesus who walked among the poor, the poorest, the most oppressed, the prostitutes,the drug addicts of his time; that these people who claim to be Christian have forgotten that it was Jesus who said that it is easier for a camel to pass through the eye of a needle than for a rich man to enter the Kingdom of Heaven.

— Juan González, press conference at FSUMC, 1970, quoted in The Young Lords: A Radical History by Johanna Fernández

On December 28, the Young Lords led a silent march on the FSUMC. After sitting quietly for the duration of the service, the Young Lords stood up and nailed the doors of the church shut. Congregants who wanted to leave were released after an hour, and Carrazana told the Young Lords that there would be no police action. The Young Lords demands included space for the free breakfast program, a daycare, and a "liberation school", where children would be taught "black and Puerto Rican history". That afternoon, Young Lords spokesman Pablo Guzmán held a press conference outside the church condemning its abandonment of Christian values.

The Young Lords occupied the building for 11 days, renaming it the "People's Church". The occupation drew the attention of mayor John Lindsay, who sent a team of negotiators to the scene. One of the negotiators, a Puerto Rican man named Arnie Segarra, joined the occupiers. During the occupation, the Young Lords began implementing their free breakfast program, feeding "hundreds" of children according to a report by the radio station KPFA in Berkeley, California. They also established a health clinic, began teaching "liberation school" classes during evenings, and provided dinners for Puerto Rican women. Various celebrities visited the occupied church, including Budd Schulberg, Donald Sutherland, Elia Kazan, Gloria Steinem, Jane Fonda, Joe Bataan, Joe Cuba, José Torres, and Ray Barretto.

On December 30, the New York Supreme Court ordered the Young Lords to vacate the church. The Young Lords did not comply, and were held in contempt of court, with an official affidavit being served on January 5. The Young Lords countered with an affidavit by asserting they had not disrupted services and were being scapegoated for challenging the church's failure to serve the community, citing Methodist doctrine. Also on January 5, a group of Columbia Theological Seminary students, in collaboration with Methodist bishop Lloyd Christ Wicke, issued a statement calling for the dismissal of charges against the arrested Young Lords members and for the FSUMC to accommodate the Young Lords' demands.

On the morning of January 7, after police broke into the church, 105 Young Lords and supporters were ejected from the church and peacefully arrested. They were transported to the New York Supreme Court, where they were assigned a hearing date and subsequently discharged.

=== Aftermath ===
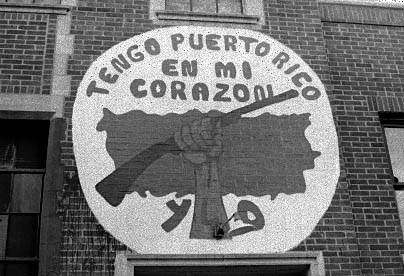
Young Lords logo on a building wall, 2003

In the immediate wake of the arrests, the Young Lords attended service at the FSUMC again, maintaining pressure on Carrazana to support their free breakfast program. Carrazana declined, but did drop charges against the Young Lords and agreed to establish a daycare center and a drug rehabilitation clinic, though these initiatives were ultimately not implemented. Soon after, governor Nelson Rockefeller requested $2.5 million for his own breakfast program, which would cover 35,000 children in New York City. The program was approved for the 1972–1973 fiscal year and supplemented by federal funds in May 1972.

After the Church Offensive, the Young Lords saw a significant increase in membership and community support. They also received extensive media coverage, with academic José Ramón Sánchez noting that the YLO was the focus of 40% of New York Times reporting on Puerto Ricans during and immediately after the event, and a third of such reporting in the following year. This media attention, coupled with endorsements from figures like Jane Fonda and Sammy Davis Jr, amplified their message and influence within the Puerto Rican community, leading to the opening of a new Bronx branch of the Young Lords in April 1970. In the ensuing years, the Young Lords continued to engage in building occupations to address community needs. Buildings occupied included the Metropolitan Hospital Center in East Harlem, which they occupied in December 1969, and Lincoln Hospital in the South Bronx, which they occupied first in July 1970 and again in November 1970.

== Historiography ==
Various historical interpretations have been offered regarding the Church Offensive. Sánchez argues that by staging a dramatic "hostage" situation, the Young Lords captured the attention of the media, which generated public sympathy and support from influential third parties, including religious leaders. This attention, Sánchez claims, ultimately led to tangible political gains for the Puerto Rican community, as shown by Herman Badillo's successful congressional run after his involvement as a mediator during the occupation.

Building on observations by social scientist Michael Calvin McGee, academic Darrel Wanzer-Serrano argues that the Church Offensive challenged the "social imaginary" as originally envisioned by philosopher Charles Taylor. In Taylor's work, the "social imaginary" refers to the way ordinary people imagine their social existence, including how they relate to others, their shared expectations, and the "normative notions and images that underlie these expectations". Wanzer-Serrano argues that the Church Offensive shifted the social imaginary of "the people", challenging the intellectual hegemony of western notions of peoplehood and "delinking" notions of coloniality and modernity.

Historian Johanna Fernández argues that the Church Offensive had a significant and wide-ranging impact beyond the immediate occupation. Fernández claims that the Young Lords' "mixture of militancy, good works, political education, and cultural resistance" had a significant impact across diverse city sectors, influencing Harlem street gangs and revitalizing the Puerto Rican independence movement in the city. Furthermore, Fernández also claims that the growth of the New York Young Lords following the occupation, particularly among women, created rhetorical space for discussions about gender roles within social movements, even as it created internal tensions and generated familial disapproval for some female members.

== See also ==
- 1967 New York City riot

== Sources ==
- Beliz, Crisol G. (2015). "'They Do Not Treat Us Like Human Beings': Latino-Police Relations in 1960's Chicago". McNair Scholars Journal. 19 (1): 6–16.
- Demaree-Raboteau, Julia (2011). "Emmaus House and Orthodoxy: Living with the Poor". Sophia Institute Studies in Orthodox Theology. 2: 327–331. doi:10.7916/D85M6G2R.
- Fernández, Johanna (2020). The Young Lords: A Radical History. Chapel Hill: University of North Carolina Press. ISBN 978-1-4696-5345-7.
- Fernández, Lilia (2018). "Founding of the Young Lords, 1968-1972". In Fernández, Lilia (ed.). 50 Events That Shaped Latino History: An Encyclopedia of the American Mosaic. Vol. 2. Santa Barbara: ABC-CLIO. pp. 625–641.
- Guzmán, Pablo (1998). "La Vida Pura: A Lord of the Barrio". In Torres, Andrés (ed.). The Puerto Rican Movement: Voices from the Diaspora. Philadelphia: Temple University Press. pp. 155–172. ISBN 1-56639-617-4.
- Jeffries, Judson (2003). "From Gang-Bangers to Urban Revolutionaries: The Young Lords of Chicago". Journal of the Illinois State Historical Society. 95 (3): 288–304.
- Rockefeller, Nelson A. (1972). Public Papers of Nelson A. Rockefeller: Fifty-Third Governor of the State of New York, 1972. Albany: State of New York. OCLC 1258798.
- Sánchez, José Ramón (2007). Boricua Power: A Political History of Puerto Ricans in the United States. New York; London: New York University Press. ISBN 978-0-8147-9847-8.
- Taylor, Charles (2004). Gaonkar, Dilip Parameshwar; Kramer, Jane; Lee, Benjamin; Warner, Michael (eds.). Modern Social Imaginaries. Durham: Duke University Press. doi:10.1515/9780822385806. ISBN 978-0-8223-8580-6.
- Wanzer-Serrano, Darrel (2015). The New York Young Lords and the Struggle for Liberation. Philadelphia: Temple University Press. ISBN 978-1-4399-1204-1.
