= Division Street riots =

1966 civil unrest in Chicago

Division Street Riots
- Date: June 12–14, 1966
- Location: Humboldt Park, Chicago, Illinois, United States
- Result: Foundation of Spanish Action Committee of Chicago (SACC) and Latin American Defense Organization

Parties
Puerto Rican Chicago residents	Chicago Police

Casualties and losses
Wounded: 16	

The Division Street riots were episodes of rioting and civil unrest in Chicago which started on June 12 and continued through June 14, 1966. These riots are remembered as a turning point in Puerto Rican civic involvement in Chicago. This was the first riot in the United States attributed to Puerto Ricans.

== History and cause ==
Puerto Rican migration to Chicago peaked in the 1950s and 60s, and the Puerto Rican population of Chicago jumped from 255 in 1950 to 32,371 in 1960. Puerto Ricans in Chicago worked low-paying jobs in the service industries or labored in factories. This was in part because of the recruitment efforts of Castle, Barton and Associates, an employment agency. They offered domestic and foundry work contracts, and paid the airfare for Puerto Ricans coming to Chicago. Another factor behind Puerto Rican migration to Chicago was the unemployment and harsh economic conditions created by Operation Bootstrap.

Some of the new Puerto Rican arrivals settled in Chicago's north side, specifically in Lincoln Park. But by the late 1960s, gentrification took hold in Lincoln Park, and working class Puerto Ricans were displaced by high property taxes and expensive housing. Around the city, some Puerto Ricans faced housing discrimination based on their skin color and ethnicity. Many moved west, settling near Division Street in West Town, Bucktown, and Wicker Park. The Chicago Catholic Church did not offer the Puerto Rican community their own parish, so devout Puerto Ricans had to try to attend existing parishes. In the 1950s and 60s, some white parishes did not accept Puerto Rican parishioners, so Puerto Ricans were displaced, looking for a place to worship and meet. According to Felix M. Padilla, the systematic oppression that Puerto Ricans experienced in Chicago in the 1960s created a psychological climate for riot. Puerto Ricans faced racial discrimination, class-related hardships, and lived on the margins of a city that only valued them for their cheap labor.

Puerto Ricans in Chicago carried deep feelings of resentment towards the police. Puerto Ricans associated the police with poor service of the community and brutal, rude interactions. Despite these tense conditions, police superintendent Orlando W. Wilson reported that the police report on racial tensions he ordered on June 7 showed no signs of unrest in the Puerto Rican community.

== Riots ==
In 1966, Chicago mayor Richard J. Daley declared the first week of June to be "Puerto Rican Week." On June 12, 1966, Puerto Ricans celebrated the culmination of this week, and their first ethnic parade in downtown Chicago, held on June 11. In the evening, on Division Street in West Town and Humboldt Park, an altercation began between police and revelers near Damen Avenue and Division Street. Police alleged that Arcelis Cruz, a young Puerto Rican man, was armed and involved in a street fight. A white police officer, Thomas Munyon, shot Cruz in the leg. A large crowd gathered, and bystanders became involved. Some gathered to try to help Cruz, others to demonstrate against police violence. More police were called, with canine units. A police officer let a police dog bite a Puerto Rican man on the leg. The crowd of over 4,000 Puerto Ricans attacked the police with rocks, bottles, and cans, and smashed windows on police cars. The crowd overturned some police cars, and set fire to others. More police and canine units were called in, but the rioting continued for three days.

As the riot began, a local Spanish-language radio personality, Carlos Agrelot, was broadcasting live, describing the scene on Division Street. His coverage of the violence and protest attracted more people to the streets, even people from other neighborhoods.

On the second day of the riot, community organization leaders and clergymen organized a rally. At this rally, organizers urged the crowd of 3,000 Puerto Ricans to end the violence. The police department also ordered officers to de-escalate the conflict. However, after the rally, rioters threw bricks and rocks at police officers, and the riot continued. Rioters targeted white-owned businesses as they looted and burned property in the neighborhood.

On the third night, 500 police officers patrolled the Division Street area, attempting to suppress the uprising. Over the course of the three nights of the riot, 16 people were injured, 49 were arrested, and 50 buildings were critically damaged.

== Aftermath ==
Following the riot, community leaders organized several peace rallies at Humboldt Park. There were also marches and demonstrations, including a march on June 28, 1966, at which over 200 Puerto Ricans from the Division Street area marched five miles to City Hall to protest the city government's negligence and police brutality.

A month after the riot, the Chicago Commission on Human Relations held open hearings, which provided a forum for Puerto Rican and other Spanish-speaking residents of Chicago to discuss problems facing these communities. They discussed the displacement and discrimination in housing, discriminatory practices by the police and fire departments, and poor educational opportunities. The hearings lasted for two days. During the hearings, Puerto Ricans cited a lack of jobs, poor housing and education, little political power, union discrimination, inadequate city services, and police brutality. As a result of these meetings, the Puerto Rican community proposed specific policy recommendations.

With support from Community Action Agencies in the Division Street Area, the riots inspired the creation of Puerto Rican community organizations. These include the Spanish Action Committee of Chicago (SACC), the Latin American Defense Organization (LADO), the Bickerdike Redevelopment Corporation, the ASPIRA Association and the Young Lords (in 1968); cultural centers such as the Ruiz Belvis Cultural Center and the Juan Antonio Corretjer Puerto Rican Cultural Center; and a school, the Escuela Superior Puertorriqueña (which is now named Dr. Pedro Albizú Campos Puerto Rican High School). Developing from the riots, these organizations' members were younger and more militant than earlier organizations such as the Caballeros de San Juan, Damas de María and the Puerto Rican Congress. They worked to get community concerns such as education, housing, health, and employment addressed by the city and to assert a Puerto Rican presence in city politics.
