= Felipe Luciano =

American politician and writer (born 1947)

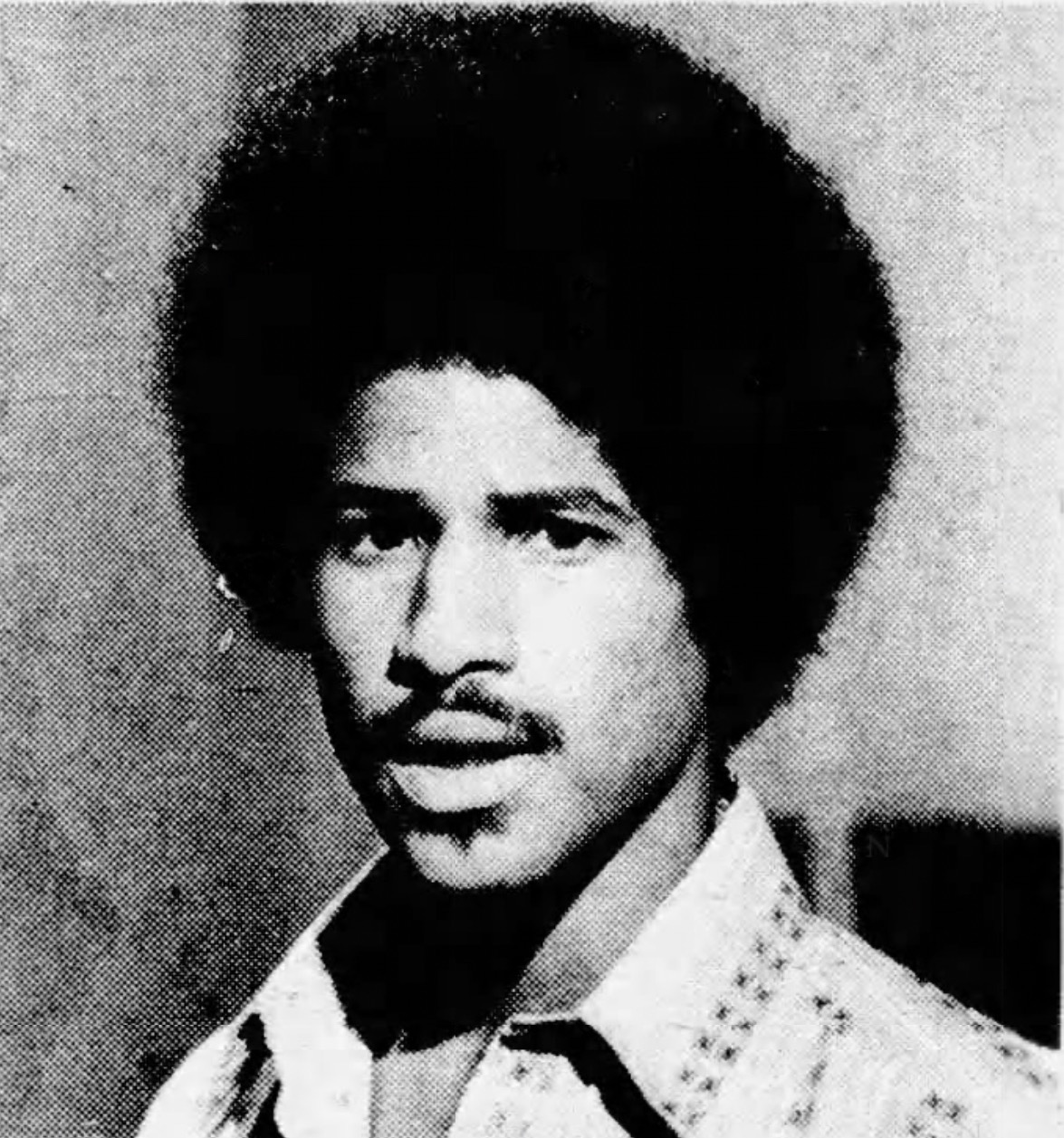
Luciano in 1975

Felipe Luciano (born 1947, East Harlem, New York City) is a poet, community activist, journalist, media personality, and politician. He is of Afro-Puerto Rican heritage. He is known for his significant involvement in both the Young Lords Party and The Last Poets, and more generally, as "an early and important participant in the awakening of the new consciousness-raising radicalism among Puerto Ricans in New York and across the country in the late 1960s and 1970s."

Luciano later became a radio, television, and print journalist.

== Early life ==
Felipe Luciano was born "Phillip" in 1947 in Spanish Harlem and was raised by his mother, Aurora, who was a devout Pentecostal Christian. Luciano describes the public housing project where they lived as "the craphole of the world," saying, "no one ever placed as his or her first choice on the Housing Authority application, 'Brookline Projects.'" He feels that his childhood was cut short, in large part due to the absence of his father. At age 12 he became part of a gang called the Canarsie Chaplain Division, which was made up of "guys who would go hard if forced to, but would rather look good, go to school, and talk to the ladies." Of his early adolescence he says, "I went buck wild — gangs, screwing around, getting high, I got involved in all that stuff," but he also recalls the bonds between members of the gang as being defined by "true, everlasting love."

When Luciano was 16, he initiated a fight with a member of a different gang who had attacked his brother. The fight resulted in the target being fatally stabbed, though not by Luciano himself. Nevertheless, Luciano was convicted of manslaughter and served two years in prison. Some understanding of Luciano's feelings about his incarceration may be gleaned from a speech he gave in 2010 at the commencement ceremony for inmates receiving bachelor's and associate degrees from the college program at Sing Sing Prison. Speaking to the graduates, he said, "Prison is the place where faith is tested. You are here because you were there. But if you pass this, you are good to go." This conviction is likely based on Luciano's own experience. Following his release, he attended Queens College as a political science major, joined The Last Poets, and co-founded the New York chapter of the Young Lords. (It was during this time that he changed his name to Felipe, a move that can be understood as a means of emphasizing his Puerto Rican identity). Later, he had a successful career as a journalist and television and radio show host, and continues to be a well-respected public figure today.

== Organizational affiliations ==
=== Involvement with The Last Poets ===
The Last Poets, whose name was inspired by a poem by K. William Kgositsile and chosen by founding member David Nelson, was "An ensemble of African American and Afro–Puerto Rican poet-performers... known for the powerful and vigorous vernacular immediacy and rhythmic, spoken-word presentations of [their] street-wise, nimble verse, which preceded any formal articulation of a Nuyorican aesthetic and early anticipated the rap compositions of a later era."

Felipe Luciano joined the group soon after his release from prison in 1966, at the suggestion of poet Victor Hernandez-Cruz. Luciano joined founding members Gylan Kain and Abiodun Oyewole who were looking to replace their third co-founder, David Nelson, who had left the group after disagreement about its structure and direction.

Of the group's cultural appeal and significance, Umar Bin Hassan, who joined the group after Luciano, said "It's that feeling, that very spiritual thing that comes out and just pulls you in and makes you become part of the pain, the diaspora."

Simultaneous to his involvement with The Last Poets, Luciano was also a member of the Boricua Artists Guild, thereby helping to connect the Nuyorican and Black Arts Movements. As Juan Flores and Miriam Jiménez Román write in the introduction to The Afro-Latin@ Reader: History and Culture in the United States, "Collaborations between these [Nuyorican] poets and such primarily African American ensembles as The Last Poets and the Third World Revelationists attest to the strong cultural bonds felt by Afro-Latin@s with the African American contemporaries."

=== Work with the Young Lords Party ===
The Young Lords became the community organization it is today in September 1968 under the leadership of Jose Cha Cha Jimenez in Chicago. As Felipe Luciano remembers it in an interview with EBONY Magazine, "Fred Hampton of the Black Panthers was in jail with the leader of a gang called the Young Lords named Cha Cha Jimenez, and he schools Cha Cha: 'Why are you guys killing each other? Can't you see that's what the Man wants you to do?' Cha-Cha was so impressed that when he came out of jail, he changed the Young Lords from a gang to a social organization." As for the creation of the New York chapter that Luciano helped found, he explains, "We heard about it, sent a group out there, and started a chapter in New York. I was elected chairman, and we became a political party."

The group, which eventually changed its name from the Young Lords Organization to the Young Lords Party as part of separating somewhat from the Chicago branch, focused their efforts on concrete ways of improving community wellbeing. Inspired by the Black Panthers, they instituted free breakfast programs in schools. They also pushed for access to Tuberculosis testing and lead paint testing, in addition to the general improvement of treatment for Puerto Rican patients in local hospitals. Their work with healthcare played a role in bringing about "the Patient's Bill of Rights which is now standard in New York City hospitals." The organization often used direct action to bring these changes about, most famously occupying the First Spanish Methodist Church in East Harlem for 11 days under Luciano's leadership. The goal of the action was to demand that the parishioners "provide more social services for the East Harlem community," and the church ultimately "agreed to establish a day-care center for the community's children."

As for Luciano's role in the group in particular, editor of Puerto Rican Poetry: An Anthology from Aboriginal to Contemporary Times, Roberto Márquez writes that, "He was instrumental in its success in promoting an agenda of militant direct action and community empowerment, ethnic pride, and civil rights, which fought against the discriminatory typecasting of "Puerto Ricans as a community of rural immigrants.'" Nevertheless, Luciano's time with the Young Lords did not end smoothly. He was "ousted" from his role as chairman in 1970 after being charged by the group's central committee (Pablo Guzman, Denise Oliver, Juan Gonzalez, and David Perez) with "male chauvinism, unclear politics, political individualism and lack of development." Although Luciano was considered welcome as a general member of the organization following the ousting, his involvement ultimately declined.

Today, however, he recalls his time with the Young Lords with fondness and pride, especially in relation to its significance as a site of Afro-Hispanic power and visibility. In fact, he evoked his time in the Young Lords in response to more recent ideas of African-American/Latinx conflict, saying "We had Afros. We wore Dashikis. We were friends with Muslims. And one third of the party was African-American! So this notion that we can't celebrate each other's culture, or fight in each other's revolution is false." Editors of The Afro-Latin@ Reader: History and Culture in the United States, Juan Flores and Miriam Jiménez Román agree, writing "The ascendancy of the Young Lords Party in the late 1960s attests to the participation of Latin@s in the African American Civil Rights and Black Power movements and to the first generalized affirmation of Blackness among young Puerto Ricans born in the United States."

== Poetry ==
In the brief biography and analysis of his work that accompanies Felipe Luciano's poems in Puerto Rican Poetry: An Anthology from Aboriginal to Contemporary Times, editor Roberto Márquez writes that Luciano's "verse brought fresh urgency; novel dimension; and significantly new stress, passion, and popular authority to the scene with its unequivocal assertions of black pride, its ethnic self-assertion, and its unambiguous denunciations of an unjust society whose social inequities, racism, class hierarchy, disenchanting conceits, and moral hypocrisy '. . . [make] even god smell foul.'"

Luciano has not yet published a collection of his poems in book-form, but his poetry "most frequently reached its intended audience and achieved its broad general effect and popularity through the oral, visual, and compelling immediacy of its presentation in public readings, on records, in film, and as contributed to Pa'lante, the alternative newspaper of The Young Lords."

Luciano's most famous work is titled "Jíbaro, My Pretty N*****", which "[challenges] Puerto Ricans to accept their Blackness, island roots, and shared plight with African Americans." The poem uses nature imagery and includes themes of radical Black love, migration, and diaspora, and posits the "symbolic, time-honored icon" of the Jíbaro as Black, thereby asserting the centrality of Blackness in Puerto Rican national and cultural identity.

His work compares to that of Pedro Pietri, Sandra María Esteves, Victor Hernández Cruz, and other Nuyorican poets of the 1970s who similarly "[incorporated] a strong sense of Black cultural identity in their proclamation of a United States-based Puerto Rican reality."

== Political involvement ==
Felipe Luciano ran as a Democrat for New York City Council in District 8 in 2001 and 2005.

In 2001 he ran against an incumbent, Philip Reed, who he argued was "unapproachable and not empathetic" and "[lacked] a fundamental connection with the population he [represented.]" Reed, who is African-American, argued (in a manner that some might consider problematic) that Luciano was "a slick political interloper who [was] making ethnicity the issue," in reference to the fact that Luciano emphasized his familiarity with both the African-American and Puerto Rican communities in the district as part of his campaign. To strengthen his point, Reed said, "His [Luciano's] Spanish is terrible; that's the comedy." Whether or not this is true, Reed's statement is an example of how language can be perceived as an essential marker of identity. Though he posed a serious challenge to Reed, Luciano did not win the 2001 election.

He was one of six candidates who ran in the primary election for the same office in 2005, his opponents being Nelson Antonio Denis, Joyce S. Johnson, Edwin Marcial, Melissa Mark-Viverito, and John Ruiz. The issues he emphasized were affordable housing—preserving "the character and diversity of our neighborhoods" with the help of rent control and stabilization—and improving education, including the quality of teachers and facilities, and increasing after-school programs. Melissa Mark-Viverito won the election.

In 1997, Luciano was appointed to "a task force created to facilitate discussions among civilians and police officers about police behavior." His decision to participate was controversial because it meant working with pro-police, conservative, white politicians.

== Radio and television career ==
=== Radio ===
In 1983, Felipe Luciano hosted a weekly radio show called "City Rhythms" which was described as a "Latin music program hosted in English."

=== Television ===
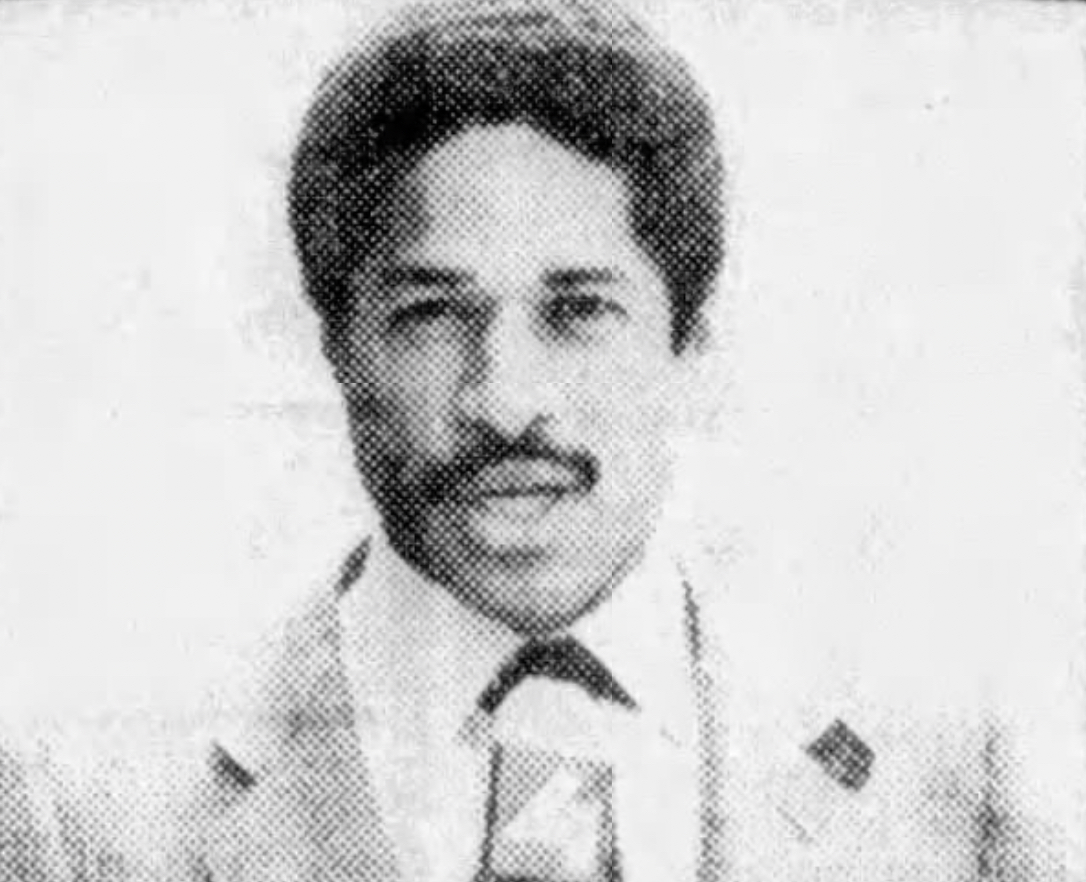
Luciano as a Channel 4 reporter, 1981

Felipe Luciano worked as a reporter for WNBC-TV's "NewsCenter 4," making him the first Puerto Rican news anchor of a major media network station in the United States.

He was also one of the original co-hosts and morning anchors of "Good Day New York" for WNYW In the early/mid 1990s., in addition, while he was at FOX 5 New York, at the time, he co-hosted and helped create the new style, fast-paced news magazine "Good Day Street Talk with Mayor Ed Koch.

== Cultural significance and legacy ==
Luciano has written about and discussed his experiences with anti-Blackness throughout his life. Luciano reports that he "appears on Black forums all the time" but has "never been invited on a Latino forum. On the radio, but not on TV. I've even had ad executives say that I was too dark and that wouldn't sell."

In addition, Luciano is often thought of as representing many different groups at once. Writing about Luciano's background and upbringing, the New York Times reported, "Because he is Black and Puerto Rican, an ex-con and a poet, the father of a Navy man and the son of a single mother, Mr. Luciano can wear many hats with ease. With a Haitian, he debates the history of the Caribbean. With an African-American, he talks as if he had just come out of the ghetto (in fact, he has lived on the Upper East Side for many years). With Hispanic guests to his show, he reverts to short, endearing phrases in Spanish." In this way, his work, art, and activism connect to the larger project of fighting anti-Blackness within the Latinx community and to uplifting Black Latinx stories, experiences, art, and visions of liberation.

In response to the question of how he wants to be remembered, Luciano said, "as a scholar, a poet, a writer, and as a warrior for his people."

== Films featuring Felipe Luciano ==
- – Right On!: Poetry on Film (Original Last Poets; directed by Herbert Danca)
- 1973 – Badge 373 (directed by Howard Koch)
- 1979 – Salsa: Latin Music in the Cities (directed by Jeremy Marre)
- 1994 – It Could Happen to You (directed by Andrew Bergman)
- 1996 – Palante, Siempre Palante (documentary on the Young Lords; directed by Iris Morales)
- 2006 – Yo soy Boricua, pa'que tu lo sepas! (I'm Boricua, Just So You Know!)
- 2009 – Latin Music USA (Episode 2)
- 2015 – Rubble Kings (documentary directed by Shan Nicholson)
- 2018 – "Mr. Soul!" A Documentary directed by Melissa Haizlip)
