= Miguel Luciano =

Puerto Rican artist

Double Phantom/EntroP.R. and Palante (2017), Smithsonian American Art Museum

Miguel Luciano (born March 5, 1972) is a Puerto Rican artist who lives and works in New York City.

His work is included in the collections of the Smithsonian American Art Museum, the Brooklyn Museum and the Museo de Arte de Puerto Rico, San Juan.
