= José Jiménez (activist) =

Puerto Rican activist (1948–2025)

- Jiménez in 1969
- Born: August 8, 1948; Caguas, Puerto Rico
- Died: January 10, 2025 (aged 76); Chicago, Illinois, U.S.
- Other names: Cha Cha; Jose Cha Cha Jimenez
- Organization: Young Lords
- Children: 5

José Jiménez (August 8, 1948 – January 10, 2025), nicknamed Cha Cha, was a Puerto Rican political activist and the founder of the Young Lords, a Chicago-based street gang that became a civil and human rights organization. Started on September 23, 1968, it was most active in the late 1960s and 1970s.

Born in Caguas, Puerto Rico, Jiménez was taken as an infant by his mother to the United States in 1949. They lived for a time with his father near Boston, Massachusetts, but within two years the family moved to Chicago to join relatives. As a youth, he ran with a street gang, but made a turn-around in 1968 after being influenced by civil rights activists at the time like Fred Hampton of the Black Panther Party and devoted himself to reviving the Young Lords to work on issues of human rights, beginning in Chicago. Issues included redlining, displacement of the poor, welfare rights and dignity, police relations, and community needs. In addition to establishing breakfast, education and health programs, they organized politically to negotiate with city officials. They also set up chapters in other cities with Puerto Rican and Latino populations, to work on social justice.

== Biography ==
Nicknamed "Cha Cha", José Jiménez was born in Caguas, Puerto Rico, to parents Eugenia Rodríguez Flores (1929–2013), of San Lorenzo, and Antonio Jiménez Rodríguez (1924–1973) of San Salvador, Caguas. In 1949, when his mother Eugenia moved with him from Puerto Rico to New York City. They traveled to a migrant worker camp near Boston, where they were reunited with his father Antonio. They rented a work cabin from the Italian family-owners of the migrant camp.

Within two years, the Jiménez family moved to Chicago to be near relatives. His mother worked in a candy factory and did piece-work in several TV factories. She also volunteered and contributed to organizing the Catholic Daughters of Mary (Damas de María) in Chicago's Lincoln Park neighborhood.

The Jiménez family lived near Holy Name Cathedral, on the Near North Side, in what became one of the first two Puerto Rican neighborhoods in Chicago; it was known as La Clark by Puerto Ricans. It had previously been predominately ethnic German.

Orlando Dávila, who later founded the Young Lords street gang, graduated from one of Jiménez's mother's neighborhood catechism classes and became one of José's best friends. Originally, the Young Lords developed for mutual protection, recognition and reputation, in a city where their members were a mostly poor minority. Non-Puerto Rican gangs considered them a disruption to the Lincoln Park neighborhood and confrontations became frequent. Most of the new Latino children in Lincoln Park joined some form of street gang or neighborhood "club" to make their way.

Jiménez and his coalition worked closely with Harold Washington in his 1983 campaign to become the first ever black mayor of Chicago. Jiménez received no position for his help because of his negative reputation as a gang leader and criminal history.

Jiménez would earn an A.A. in business from Grand Rapids Community College in 2013, B.A. in Liberal Arts from Grand Valley State University in 2017 and a master's degree in public administration at Central Michigan University in 2020.

Jiménez died in Chicago on January 10, 2025, at age 76.

== Lincoln Park urban renewal ==
During the 1960s, the city continued its urban renewal program. Puerto Ricans had been displaced into Lincoln Park from other developing areas, but the city began to eye that neighborhood for redevelopment. City planners argued that Lincoln Park should be renovated as an inner-city suburb, in order to attract professionals and increase tax revenues, and to profit from housing turnover as lower standard properties were redeveloped.

Lincoln Park was next to Lake Michigan and near downtown; it became a successful showcase for urban living for upper classes. It is now ranked as one of the richest neighborhoods in the world. Neighborhood associations, such as the Lincoln Park Conservation Association, never consulted with the poor residents. These neighborhood associations assisted Mayor Richard J. Daley by changing zoning laws, calling for building inspectors to pressure small owners into selling, and assisting real-estate agents and bankers with neighborhood housing group tours.

The bankers, building inspectors, and real-estate agents who supported Daley's master plan for Chicago were caught illegally redlining. They were still successful in keeping African Americans largely in housing south of North Avenue. Latinos needing less expensive housing moved north to Lakeview or west to Wicker Park and Humboldt Park. Whites moved further northwest and north. Court rulings that overturned some of the redlining came too late for most poorer families, who sometimes had to leave their homes in the Lakeview, Wicker Park and Humboldt Park neighborhoods. Jiménez and his family were forced to move often, and he attended four different elementary schools during this period.

When the Young Lords was a street gang, they respected and looked for guidance from major African American gangs such as the Egyptian Cobras and the Almighty Vice Lord Nation, as well as the Black P. Stones. The latter was a large, new group from the urban-renewal-designated area of 63rd Street.

By 1967, most of the formerly white areas of Lincoln Park had been occupied by Latino residents, many of them ethnic Puerto Ricans. The original Young Lords had reached their late teens and lacked gang wars and organized meetings at the YMCA, so they ceased to exist as an organized gang. They still hung around together in certain locations, but without structure. Many then chose a chaotic, drug-filled, purposeless life. Many got married and moved away without any contact. Many were serving on active duty in Vietnam. Others, including Jiménez, were still on street corners, or jailed for different gang and drug-related crimes. The youth of Lincoln Park became involved in property crimes such as car thefts, purse-snatchings, and burglaries, but also violent armed robberies, stabbings, shootings, and disorderly conduct, much associated with the damages of drugs. Jiménez and a few Young Lords turned to hard drugs like heroin and cocaine.

In the summer of 1968, Jiménez was picked up for possession of heroin and was given a 60-day sentence at Cook County Jail, then called the Bridewell or House of Correction. During this period, Jiménez decided to change and to devote his life to the cause of human rights. He read a book by American Catholic monk Thomas Merton while in jail, and it had a strong influence on him. He was moved by the other man's account of his spiritual journey, as Jiménez had once contemplated becoming a priest. After reflection, Jiménez asked for a priest and knelt down, and confessed his sins. He was determined to change.

Immigration officials regularly detained undocumented Mexican workers taken in yearly raids. They passed through the north maximum-security cell-house for processing. Some white and African American guards mistreated the Mexicans. Jiménez gained permission to translate for such Mexican detainees, but he was not allowed to leave his third-floor cell. This made him more determined to fight for human rights. He planned to model the Black Panther Party and to create self-defense within the Puerto Rican and larger Latino communities. He intended to devote himself to this new people's movement.

Under the leadership of Jiménez, the Young Lords was transformed into the Young Lords Organization. They began by staging a series of grassroots actions on behalf of the poor people of Lincoln Park. They disrupted Lincoln Park Conservation Association meetings there, confronted real-estate brokers and landlords, created the Peoples Church and the Peoples Park, and occupied and forced the McCormick Theological Seminary to provide resources for the community. On May 15, 1969, a group of 20 Young Lords members entered the administration building of McCormick Theological Seminary, demanding $601,001 from the institution to support their work.

In response to the police killing of Manuel Ramos, an unarmed 20-year-old shot and killed by an off-duty officer while trying to break up a fight, the Young Lords held several marches against police brutality. They raised and contributed the seed money to establish the People's Law Office in Chicago. The Young Lords Organization also developed plans for low-income housing in Lincoln Park in an effort to prevent the displacement of Latinos.

With the slogan Tengo Puerto Rico en mi Corazón (I have Puerto Rico in my heart), the Young Lords worked for Puerto Rican nationalism and independence. They also sought support from Black Power groups.

The original Chicago Young Lords became the national headquarters for a movement with chapters in other cities with significant Puerto Rican populations, such as New York, Philadelphia, and Milwaukee.

The Young Lords also cooperated with other Latinos working for change elsewhere in Chicago. In Wicker Park, they connected with the Latin American Defense Organization (LADO) and supported their demonstrations for a welfare-caseworkers union and for dignified recipient rights. The Lakeview Citizen's Council, with Hilda Frontany as its leader, became proactive, well-organized and supportive of the Young Lords. David Hernández and his La Gente Organization, also in Lakeview, was an ally in their fight against gentrification. In Humboldt Park, Mecca Sorrentini and the Puerto Rican Socialist Party (PSP), the Spanish Action Committee (SACC), Puerto Rican Organization for Political Action (PROPA), West Town Concerned Citizens Coalition, and Allies for a Better Community (ABC) became allies. They all cooperated with the Young Lords and were proactive in downtown marches against Mayor Richard J. Daley.

The Young Lords were already allied with Black Panther Party in Oakland. In Chicago, they were recruited by Chairman Fred Hampton into the original Rainbow Coalition, which included the Young Patriots and Illinois chapter of the Black Panther Party.

The Young Lords initiated what they called "survival programs" at the Chicago People's Church and in other cities, modelled after projects by the Black Panthers. These included a free breakfast for children program, the Emeterio Betances Free Health Clinic, a free dental clinic, and the first free community daycare center in Chicago. The day care center was established in 1969 to support women's involvement in the Young Lords' organizing activities. It operated as a co-op, with male and female parents taking turns baby-sitting the children of the members. The Young Lords conducted demonstrations for welfare dignity and women's rights, against police brutality and racism, and for self-determination for Puerto Rico and other Latin American nations.
