= Luxembourg–United States relations =

- Luxembourg: United States

Diplomatic mission
- Embassy of Luxembourg, Washington, D.C.: Embassy of the United States, Luxembourg

Luxembourg–United States relations are the bilateral relations between the Grand Duchy of Luxembourg and the United States of America. The strong relationship is expressed both bilaterally and through common membership in NATO, OECD, and the OSCE.

== History ==
The United States, fighting on the Allied side, contributed to Luxembourg's liberation in World War I and World War II. More than 5,000 American soldiers, including U.S. Army General George S. Patton, are buried at the Luxembourg American Cemetery and Memorial near the capital of Luxembourg City, and there are monuments in many towns to American liberators. John Mersch, vice-consul of the United States in Luxembourg, was imprisoned by the German occupiers during World War II in a subcamp of the Hinzert concentration camp in Wittlich. Soldiers from the United States and Luxembourg fought side by side in the Korean War.

== Modern relations ==
According to the 2012 U.S. Global Leadership Report, 42% of Luxembourgers approve of U.S. leadership, with 33% disapproving and 25% uncertain.

== Officials ==
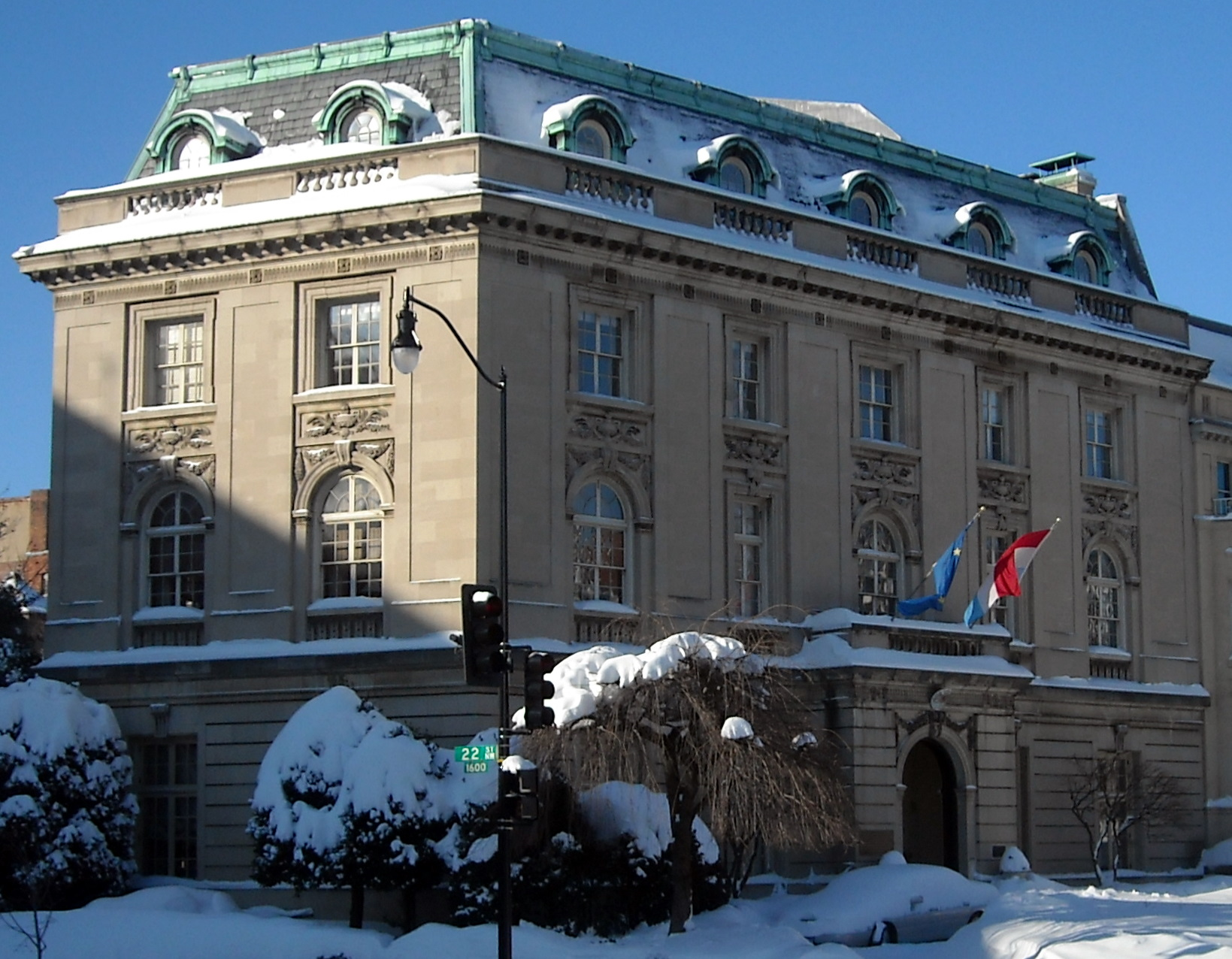
Luxembourg embassy in Washington, D.C., United States.

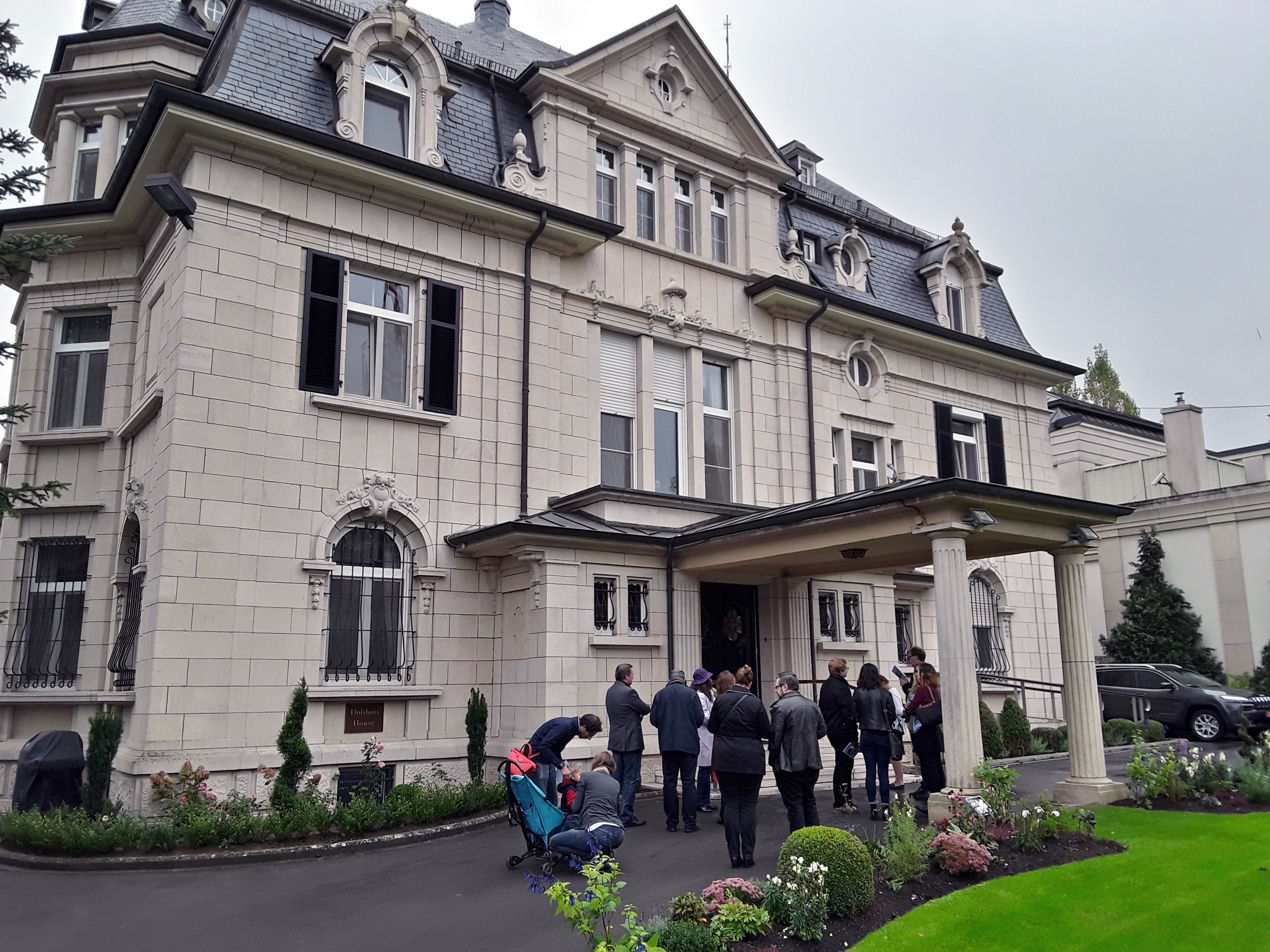
US embassy in Luxembourg.

- United States Ambassador to Luxembourg: Tom Barrett
- Ambassador of Luxembourg to the United States (concurrently non-resident Ambassador to Canada and Mexico): Nicole Bintner-Bakshian

== Embassies and Consulates ==
- Embassy of Luxembourg in Washington, D.C.
- Consulate General of Luxembourg in New York
- Consulate General of Luxembourg in San Francisco
- Embassy of the United States in Luxembourg City

== Commerce ==
- American Chamber of Commerce in Luxembourg

== Culture ==
- Luxembourg American Cultural Society

The LACS was founded in 2004 by individuals of Luxembourg descent in America as well as citizens of the Grand Duchy of Luxembourg.

- Luxembourg Brotherhood of America

== Genealogy ==
- GENELUX

Immigration from Luxembourg to the United States.

- The Luxembourgers in America

== See also ==
- Foreign relations of the United States
- Foreign relations of Luxembourg
- United States-EU relations
- NATO-EU relations
- Luxembourgish Americans
