= Luxembourgers in Chicago =

Luxembourgers in Chicago are an ethnic group in the Chicago area.

== History ==
The first Luxembourgers to come to Chicago immigrated in either 1842 or 1846 along Ridge Road in Edgewater which was just north of Chicago at the time. In 1871, just after the Great Chicago Fire parishioners of St. Michael's Church in Chicago formed the first Luxembourgish-American organization in the United States, the Luxemburger Unterstützungsverein (Luxembourg Mutual Aid Society). Other organizations followed such as the Luxembourg Brotherhood. Many Luxembourgers were Roman Catholics, and the first initial wave of immigrants lived alongside Germans in places like Old Town, later seeking to distinguish themselves from the Germans. After the fire, they moved further north to areas like Rogers Park. In 1880, there were approximately 500-700 Luxembourgers in Chicago and by 1900, that number had ballooned to about 16,000. The majority of the immigrants came from the Moselle river area, which borders Germany.

Chicago has the largest population of ethnic Luxembourgers outside of the Grand Duchy of Luxembourg itself.

=== "Greenhouse people" ===
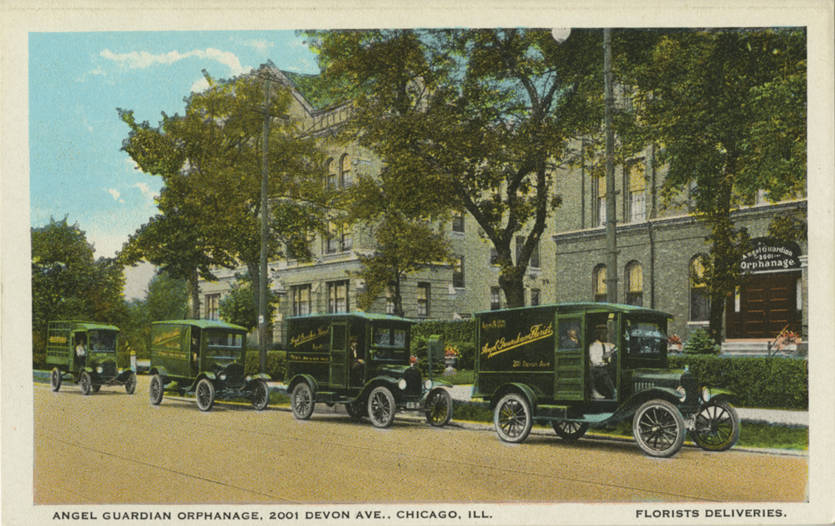
Trucks from 'Angel Guardian Florist' with 'Angel Guardian Orphanage' in the background on 2001 Devon Avenue in Chicago.

Many Luxembourgers became involved in the growing of plants in greenhouses, so much so that by 1910, most of the 100 greenhouses in Chicago were owned by Luxembourgish Americans. Some are still in operation to the present day.

== Cultural institutions ==
- St. Gregory the Great church founded in 1904.
- St. Michael Church
- Angel Guardian Orphanage, which later closed in 1975 and gave a portion of its land to Misericordia Home

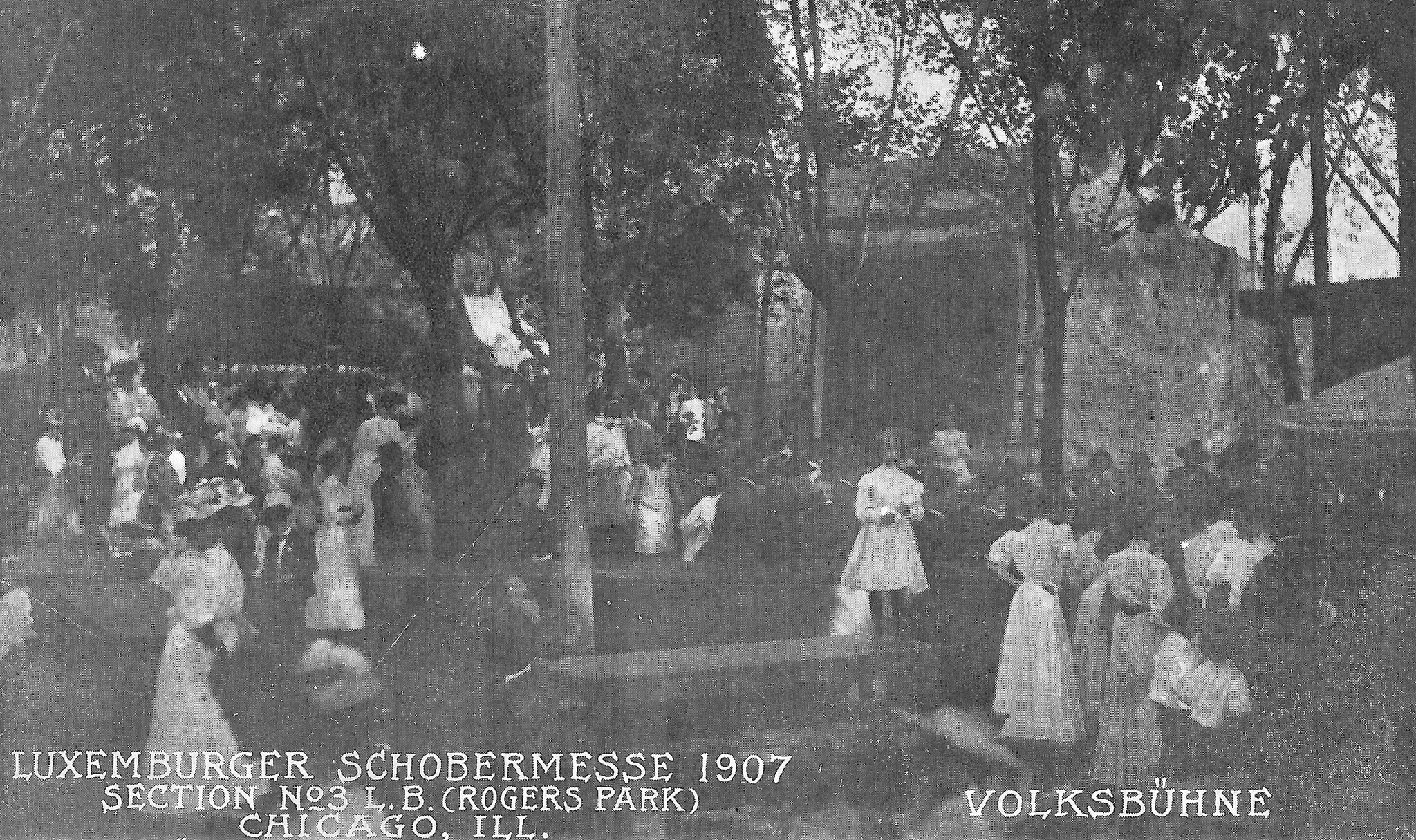
Schobermesse in Rogers Park, Chicago, 1907

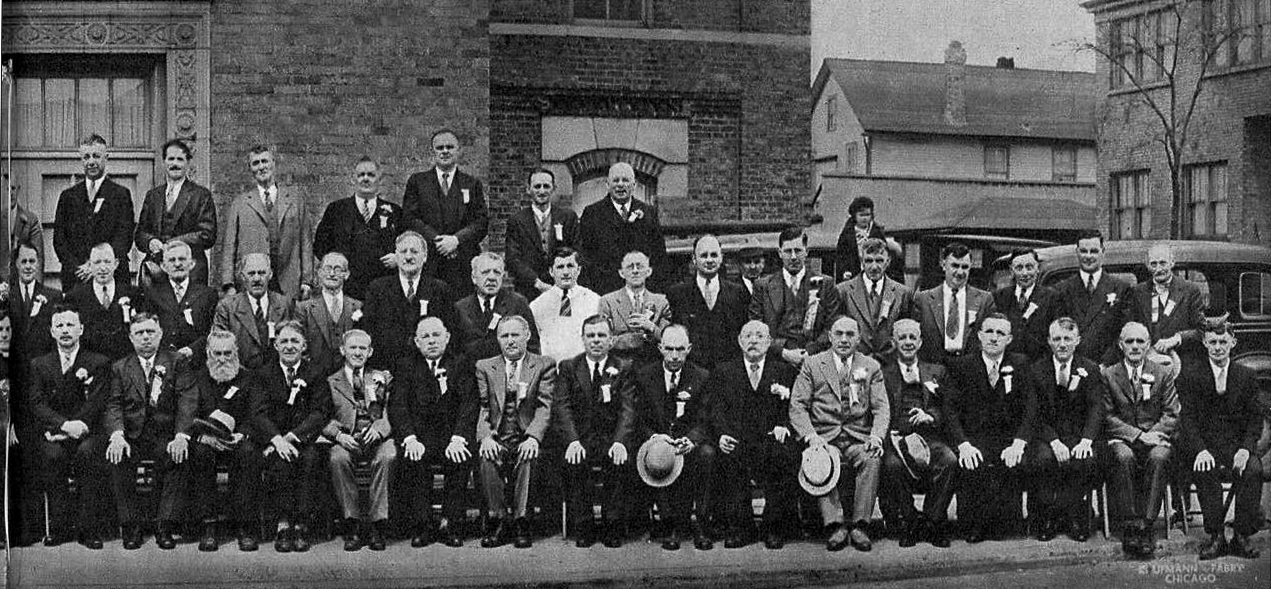
Group photo of Luxembourg Bruderbund of Chicago in 1935.

- Luxembourg Brotherhood of America holds the following events each year:
1. An annual Mass celebrating Our Lady of Consolation, Patroness of Luxembourg.
2. Sauerbraten Dinner in the Spring.
3. The National Convention in May.
4. The Schobermesse / National Day in June based on the Schueberfouer holiday started in 1340 by John the Blind in Luxembourg.
- Luxembourg Independent Club of Chicago
- Luxemburger Zeitung, later known as the Luxembourg Weekly, began publication in Chicago in 1899, with national subscription by mail beginning in 1902. It is still published, under the name Luxembourg News of America.
- Luxembourg-American Social Club, founded in Chicago in 1960

== Notable people ==
- Emil G. Hirsch
- Matthew Woll
- Red Faber
- Peter Reinberg
- John L. May
- William Heirens
- Michael J. Schaack
- Thomas E. Keane

== See also ==
- Luxembourgish Americans
