= Old Town, Chicago =

United States historic place in Chicago, Illinois

Coordinates: 41.9111°N 87.6395°W

- Old Town Triangle Historic District
- U.S. National Register of Historic Places
- U.S. Historic district
- Chicago Landmark
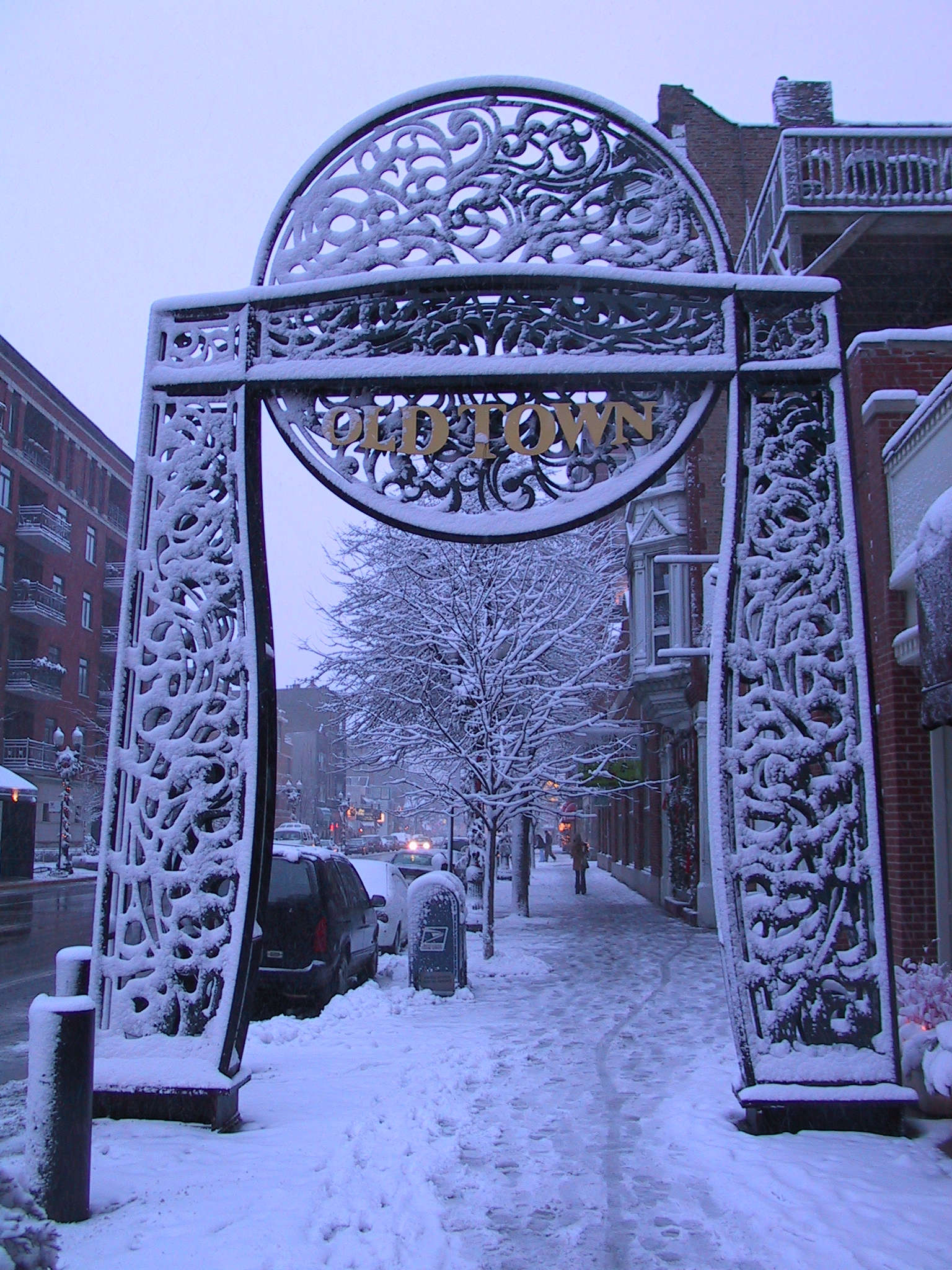
- An Old Town sign at Wells Street and North Avenue

- Location within Chicago metropolitan area Location within Illinois Location within the United States
- Location: Chicago, Illinois, U.S.
- Built: 1872
- Architectural style: Italianate, Queen Anne
- NRHP reference No.: 84000347

Significant dates
- Added to NRHP: November 8, 1984
- Designated CHICL: September 28, 1977

Old Town is a neighborhood and historic district in Near North Side and Lincoln Park, Chicago, Illinois. It contains many of Chicago's older, Victorian-era buildings, including St. Michael's Church, one of seven buildings to survive the Great Chicago Fire.

== Location and name ==
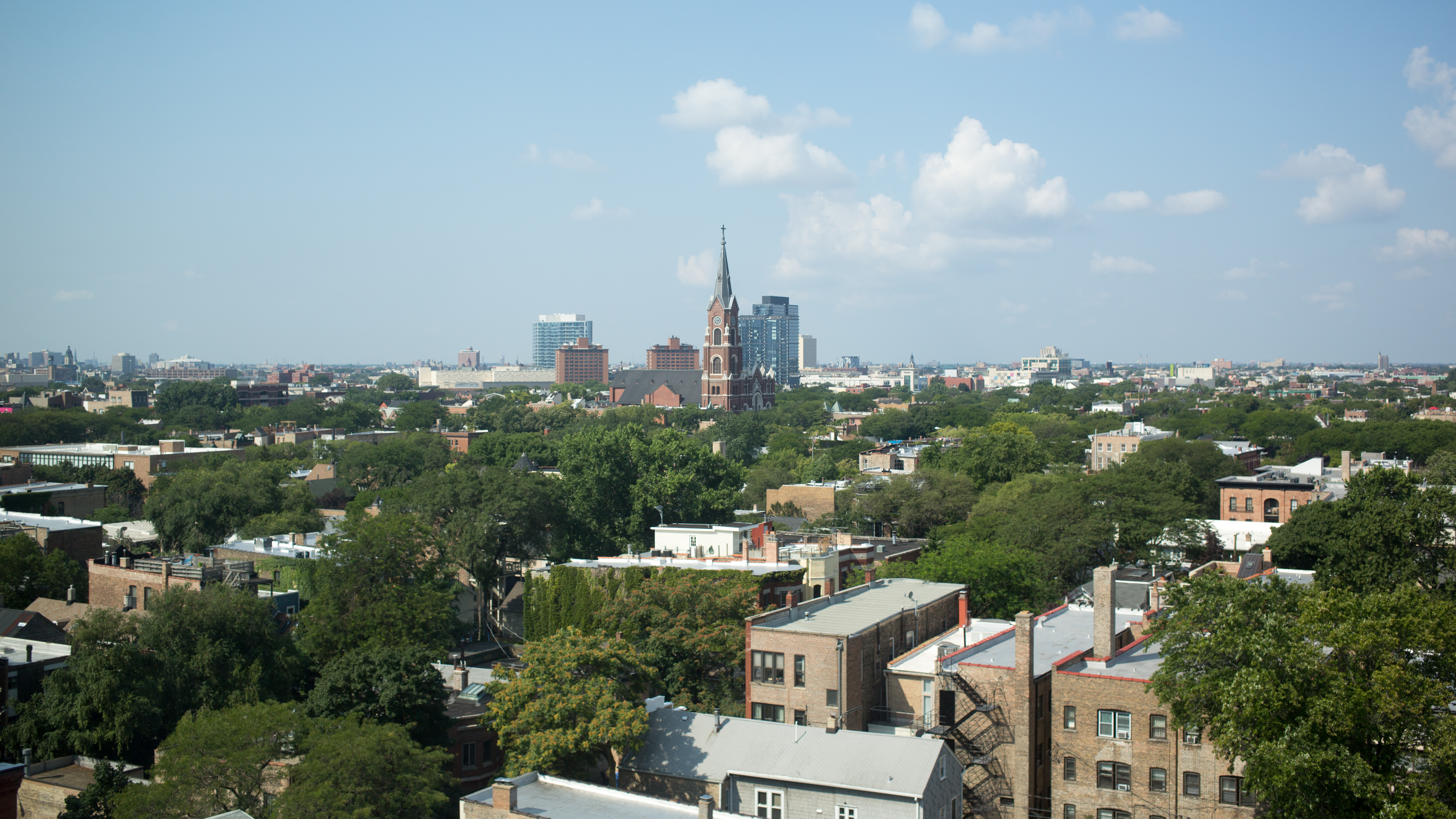
St. Michael's Church (center) in Old Town in 2015; the borders of Old Town have sometimes been described as the hearing distance of its bells.

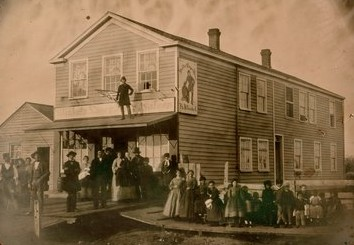
Klinkel Hall, a German beer hall in 1854 at present-day 1623 North Wells, was one of the locations for the Lager beer riot of 1855.

In the 19th century, German and Luxembourgish immigrants moved to the meadows north of North Avenue and began farming what had previously been swampland, planting celery, potatoes, and cabbages. This led the area to be nicknamed "The Cabbage Patch", a name which stuck until the early 1900s.

During World War II, the triangle formed by North Avenue, Clark Street, and Ogden Avenue (since removed) were designated a 'neighborhood defense unit' by Chicago's Civil Defense Agency. In the years immediately after the war, the population of "North Town" (as it had come to be known by the 1940s) sponsored annual art fairs called the "Old Town Holiday". The art fairs were popular attractions for the neighborhood, and the name "Old Town" was used in the title of the Old Town Triangle Association when it was formed in 1948, by residents who wanted to improve the condition of buildings that were suffering from physical deterioration.

In the 1950s, much of Old Town was an enclave for many of the first Puerto Ricans to come to Chicago. They referred to the area as part of La Clark.

No legal entity is known as "Old Town", but claims have been made as to the nature of its legally-unspecified borders:

It is important to stress that there is no such legal entity as Old Town. Old Town is where you make it.

— Richard Atcheson, Holiday Magazine, March 1967

This neighborhood is supposed to be as much a sound as a place, and it's from the bells of St. Michael's Church. The story goes you only really live in Old Town if you can hear them.

— Alan G. Artner, Chicago Tribune, March 29, 2008

... it was said that all who lived within hearing distance of the church's bells were Old Towners.

— Donna Gill, Chicago Tribune, December 4, 1967

== History ==
=== 19th century ===
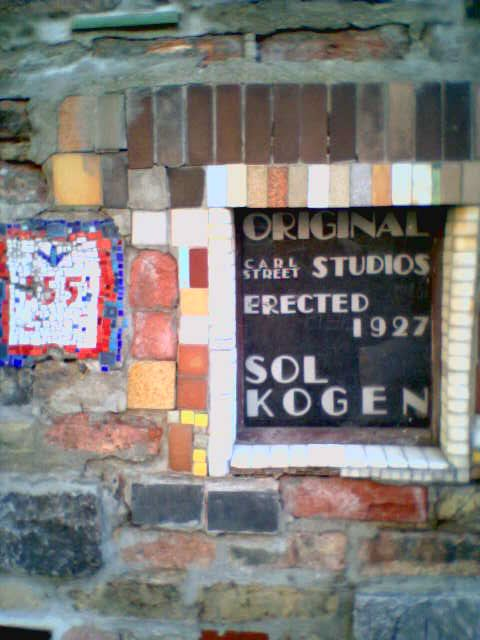
A plaque about Carl Street Studios on the building itself

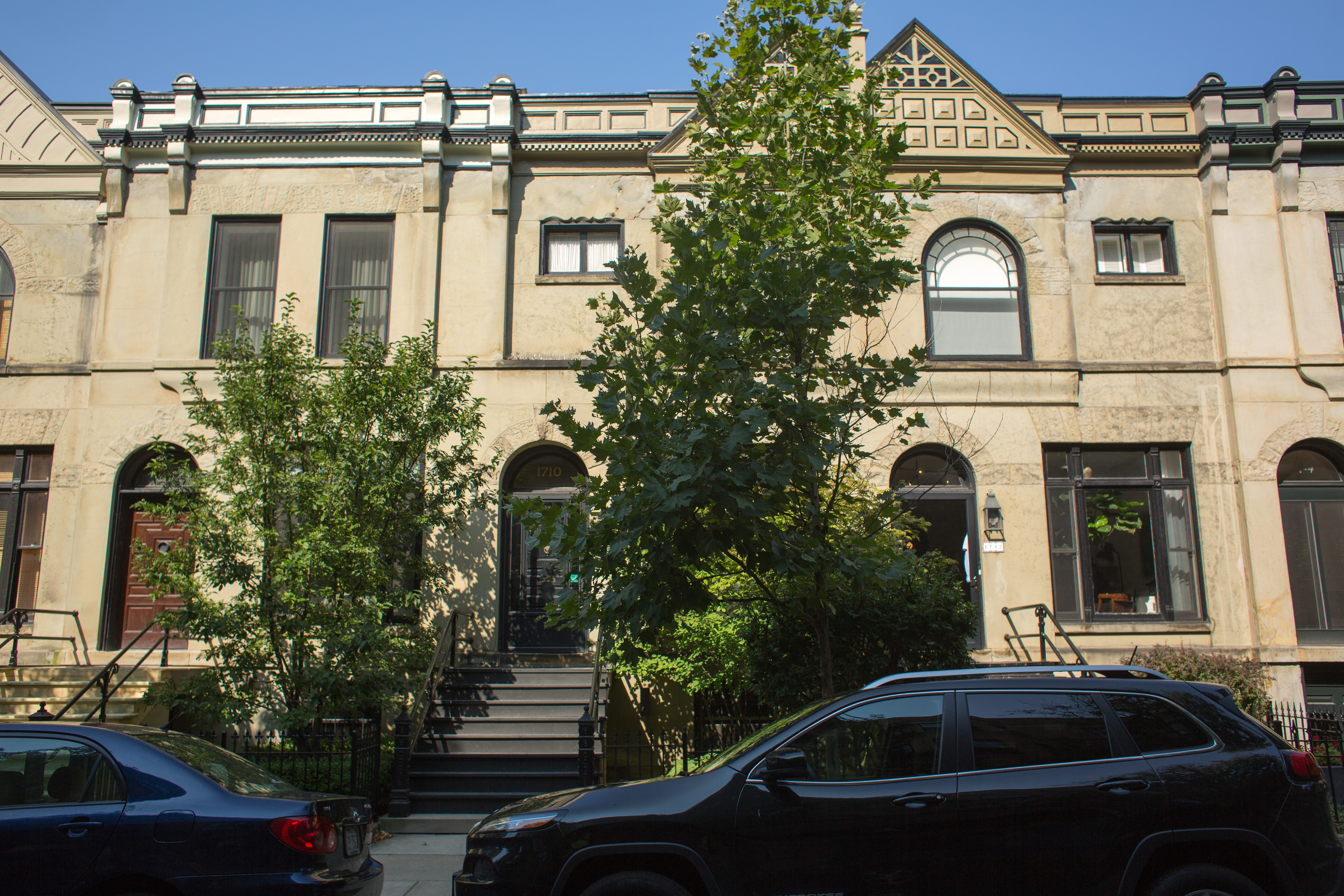
The former location of the Society for Human Rights at 1710 N. Crilly Court in Chicago in 2015

The land known as Old Town originally served as a home and trade center to many Native American nations, including the Potawatomi, Miami, and Illinois.

Following the 1833 Treaty of Chicago, most of the indigenous people were forcibly removed, and the land was then settled in the 1850s by German-Catholic immigrants. Clark Street is a leftover of the culture, being an old road which followed a slight ridge along Lake Michigan.

Old Town is the site of many of Chicago's older, Victorian-era buildings, as well as St. Michael's Church, originally a Bavarian-built church and one of seven to survive within the boundaries of the Great Chicago Fire.

Many of the streets and alleys, particularly in the Old Town Triangle section, predate the Great Chicago Fire and do not all adhere to a typical Chicago grid pattern.

=== 20th century ===
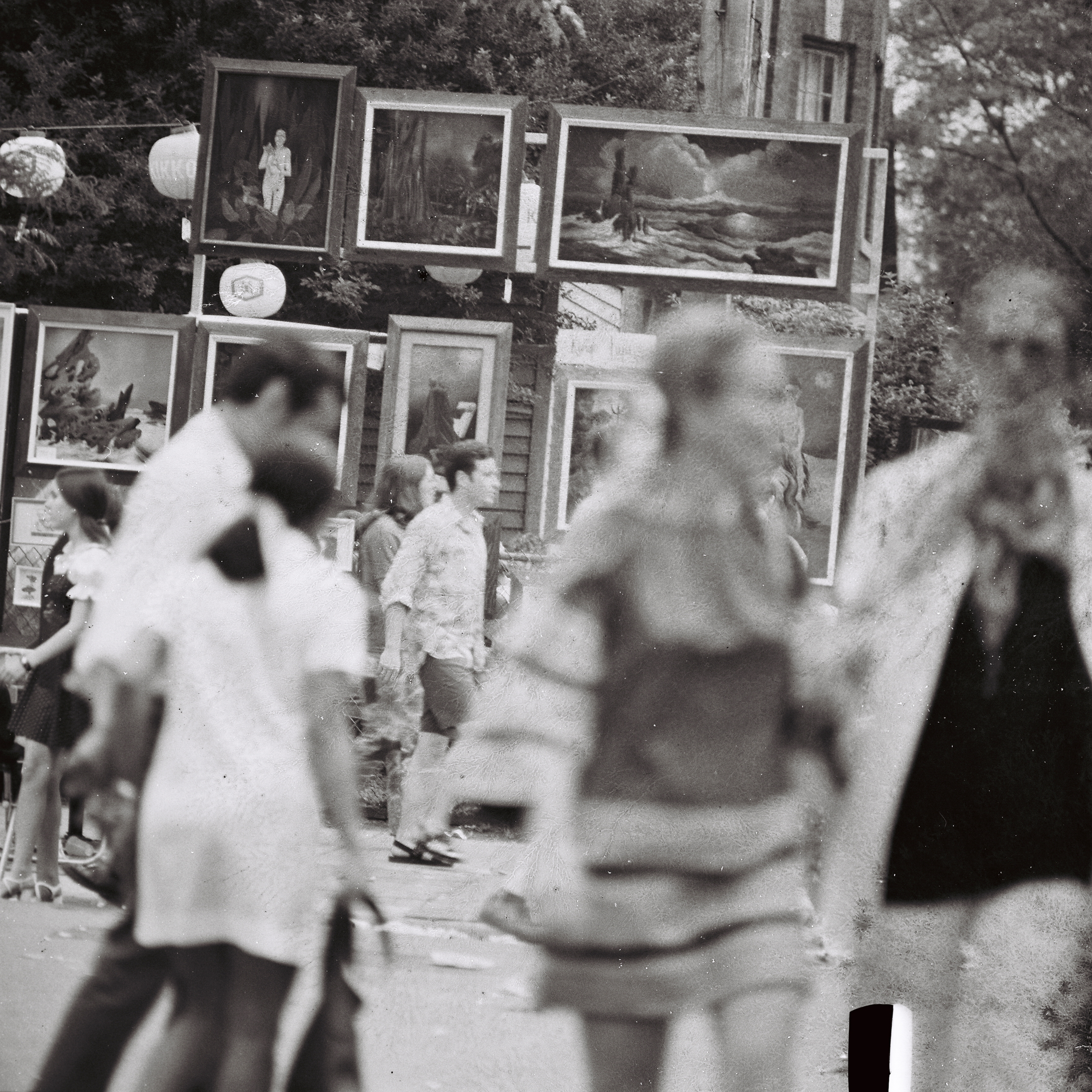
People and art at the Old Town Art Fair in the 1960s

Anti-Vietnam War protesters in Lincoln Park during the 1968 Democratic National Convention; the band MC5 can be seen playing

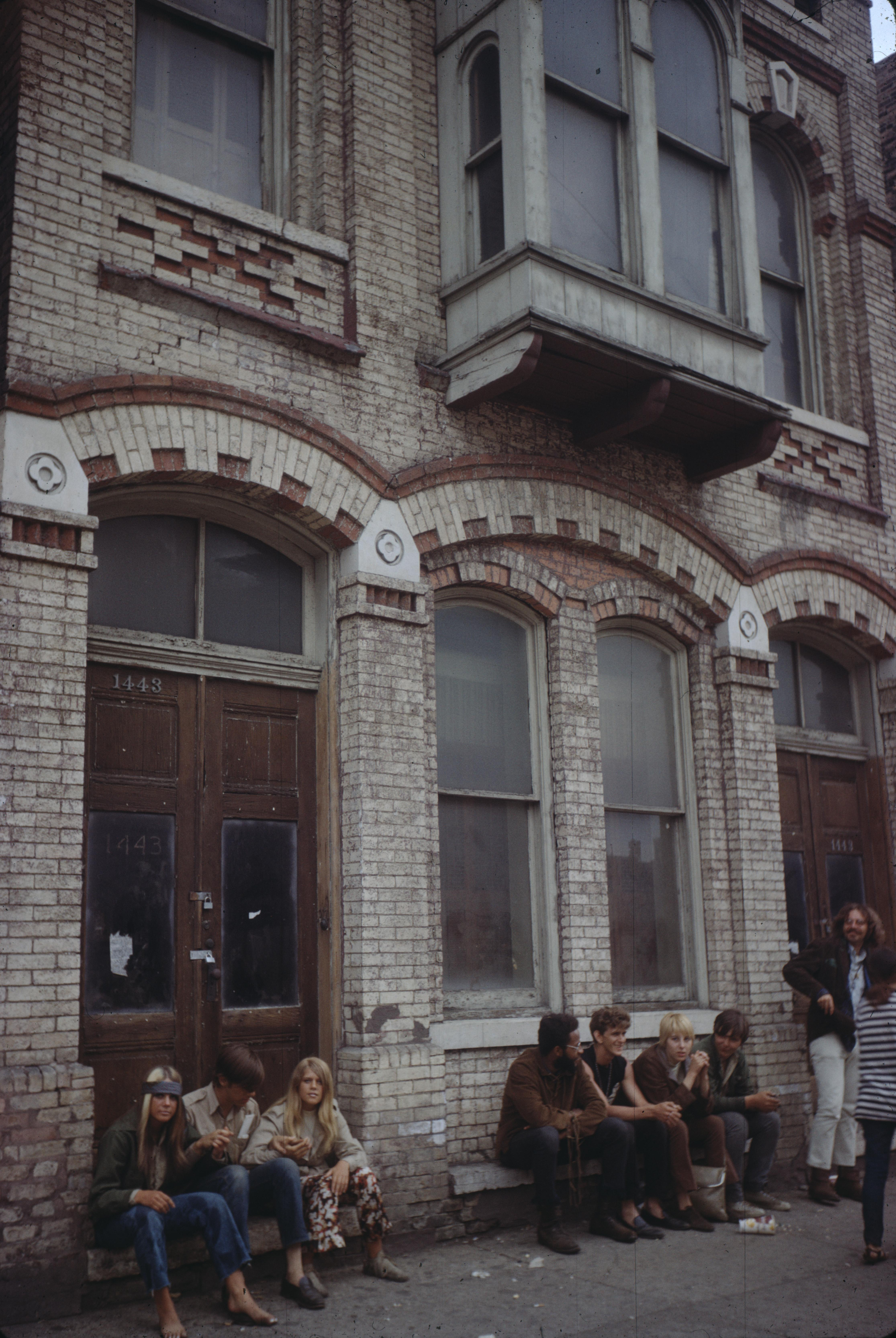
Hippies in Old Town in 1968

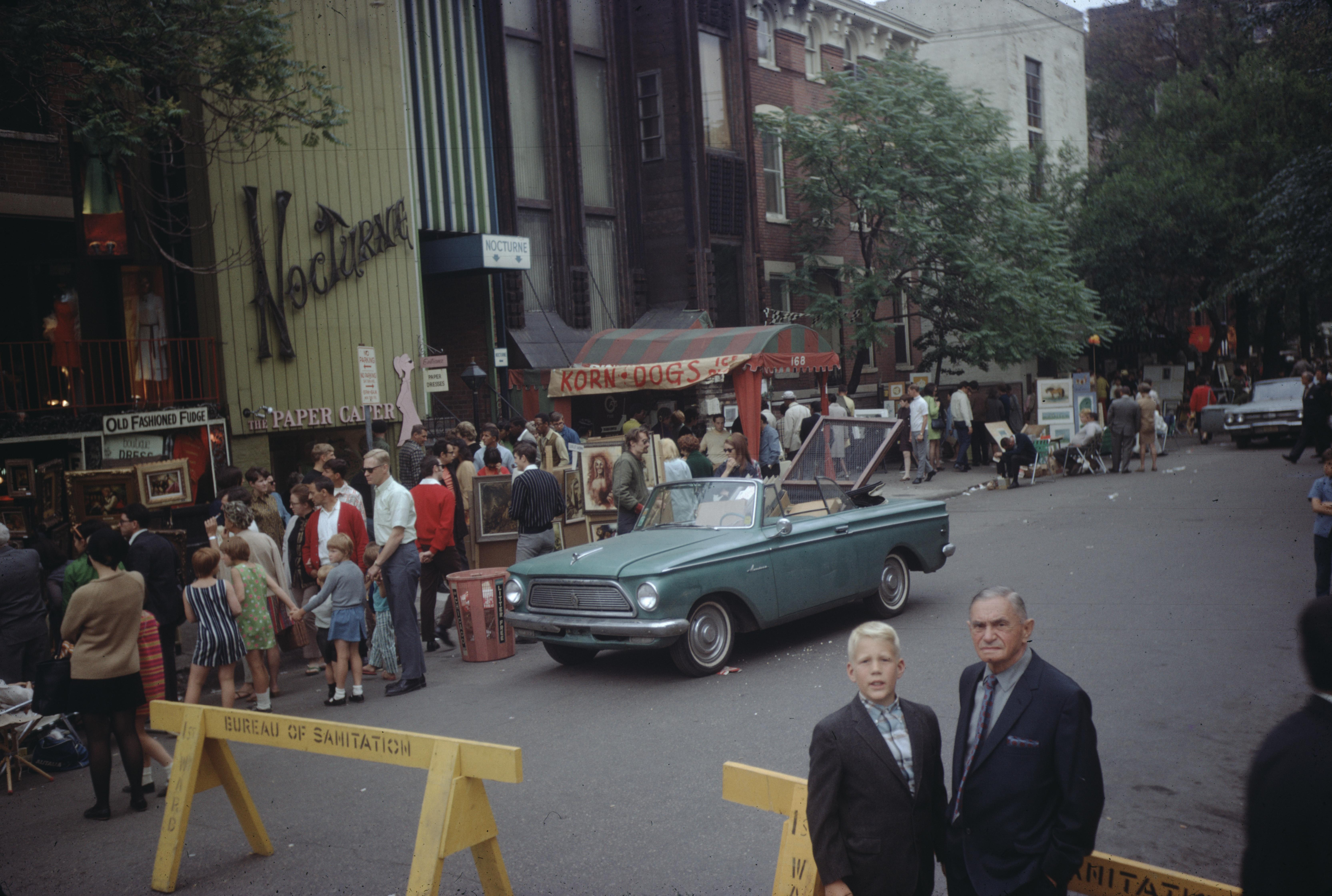
Vendors and pedestrians at the Old Town Art Fair on Wells Street in 1968

Old Town has one Brown-Purple Line 'El' station, at 1536–40 North Sedgwick Street. It is one of the oldest standing stations on the El, built in 1900.

In 1924, the first gay rights organization in American history, the Society for Human Rights, was established by Henry Gerber at his home, the Henry Gerber House, on North Crilly Court. The Henry Gerber House was designated a Chicago Landmark on June 6, 2001. In June 2015, it was named a National Historic Landmark.

In 1927, sculptors Sol Kogen and Edgar Miller purchased and subsequently rehabilitated a house on Burton Place, near Wells Street, into the Carl Street Studios. During the 1930s, an art colony emerged in the neighborhood as artists moved from the Towertown neighborhood near Washington Square Park.

In 1955, upon the first election of Mayor Daley, 43rd ward alderman Paddy Bauler, who kept a saloon in Old Town at North and Sedgwick Avenues called De Luxe Gardens, famously declared "Chicago ain't ready for reform yet" many times over in his bar while dancing a jig.

During the 1960s, the neighborhood was the center of the yippie and hippie counter culture in the midwestern United States. This was mostly because by the 1950s and 1960s, many of the original families that had settled in the neighborhood had moved to the suburbs during white flight, leaving older Victorian buildings with storefronts available to rent inexpensively. A community of Puerto Ricans formed along Wieland, North Park, Sedgwick and west on North Avenue. The Young Lords, then a street gang with Jose Cha-Cha Jimenez had a branch of their group at Wieland and North Avenues. This dense storefront-laden area (Wells and North Avenues) became also the nexus of hippie culture, (as well as the newly emerging out-homosexual culture) and gave rise to the boutiques (Crate & Barrel, for example) in the neighborhood today. Seed was a literary staple of the neighborhood at the time.

There is a little piece of Chicago Real Estate, west of Lincoln Park, that is the pride of urban conservationists and the despair of bulldozers. It is a community widely known as Old Town ... Old Town is full of conflict, full of life; a sometimes maddening but always exciting place to live.

— Richard Atcheson, Holiday Magazine, March 1967

The violent events that took place during the 1968 Democratic National Convention transpired primarily in Grant Park, Old Town, and Lincoln Park, adjacent to Old Town.

I pointed out that it was in the best interests of the City to have us in Lincoln Park ten miles away from the Convention hall. I said we had no intention of marching on the Convention hall, that I didn't particularly think that politics in America could be changed by marches and rallies, that what we were presenting was an alternative life style, and we hoped that people of Chicago would come up, and mingle in Lincoln Park and see what we were about.

— Abbie Hoffman, from the Chicago 7 trial

The film The Weather Underground has a scene on La Salle Avenue in Old Town, which describes the Zeitgeist of the era.

Old Town was home to many gays and lesbians from the 1960s through the 1980s. There were numerous gay bars lining Wells Street (all of them closed as of 2013). This was the first "gay ghetto" in Chicago, predating the current Lake View neighborhood (which is the current epicenter of gay life). As the area gentrified, gay residents moved further north to Lincoln Park and then Lake View neighborhoods.

During the 1960s and 1970s, Old Town became the center of Chicago folk music, which was experiencing a revival at the time. In 1957, the Old Town School of Folk Music opened at 333 West North Avenue and stayed at that address until 1968, when the school moved to 909 West Armitage Avenue. It has retained the name, although it is no longer located within Old Town. Singer-songwriters such as Bob Gibson, Steve Goodman, Bonnie Koloc, and John Prine played at several clubs on Wells Street, such as The Earl of Old Town. The Old Town School of Folk Music was closely associated with these artists and clubs. One large and successful folk club was Mother Blues, which featured nationally known artists and groups such as Jose Feliciano, Odetta, Oscar Brown Jr., Josh White, and Chad Mitchell. It also presented comedian George Carlin, Sergio Mendez, Brazil '66, and The Jefferson Airplane.

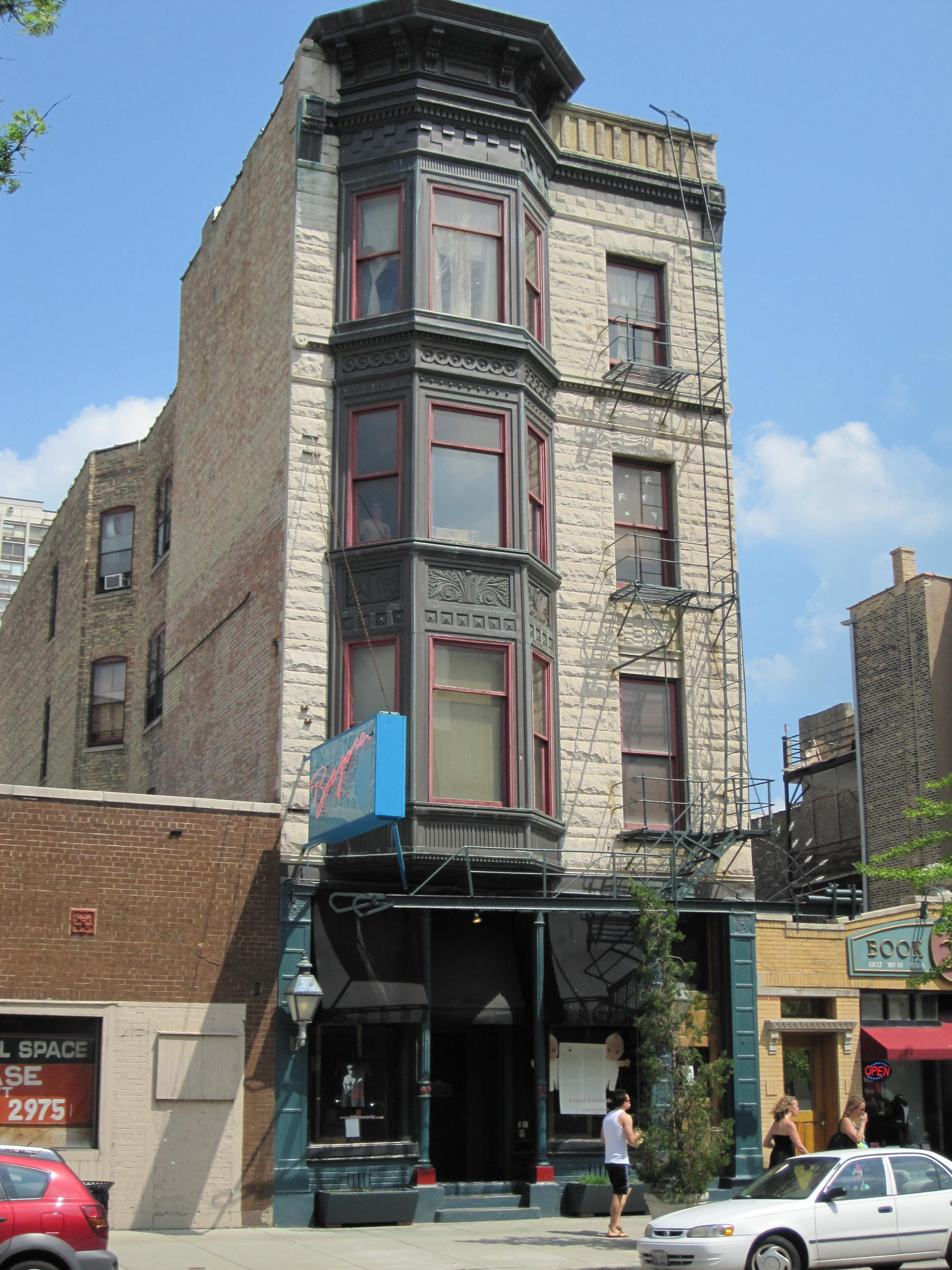
Bijou Theater

A few of the institutions from the 1960s era still exist today, such as Crate & Barrel, The Second City, the Old Town Ale House, Bijou Video, the Old Town School of Folk Music (which moved after the 1968 riots), the Fudge Pot, the Up Down Tobacco Shop (which used to be located just south of its current location), and the Old Town Aquarium (which moved in 2019 to Irving Park, while keeping its name).

After the assassination of Martin Luther King Jr. and the subsequent riots, the neighborhood experienced a tense racial division during the 1970s and 1980s which left a segregation between Old Town north of North Ave. and Old Town south of North Ave. In the early 2000s, this trend had begun to shift towards a gentrification of the area south of North Ave. on Sedgwick, Blackhawk, Hudson and Mohawk streets, near the Marshall Field Garden Apartments. The area to the west of these streets, near the North and Clybourn Red Line stop had been dubbed "SoNo" by real estate developers. SoNo's boundaries are North Avenue, Halsted Street, Division Street and the North Branch of the Chicago River. Currently, Old Town south of North Avenue is a mixture of wealth and poverty, though the area is steadily gentrifying. The demolition of the Cabrini–Green high rise housing projects to the south has led to significant demographic changes in the neighborhood. The original Francis X. Cabrini Row Houses still are standing. The Parkside of Old Town development was built replacing the Cabrini-Green high rises just south of Old Town.

By 1976, Wells Street in Old Town had many sex-industry businesses operating, so many that Wells street was specifically named in Time Magazine's 1976 article "The Porno Plague". It was thought that some of the businesses had mob connections.

=== 21st century ===
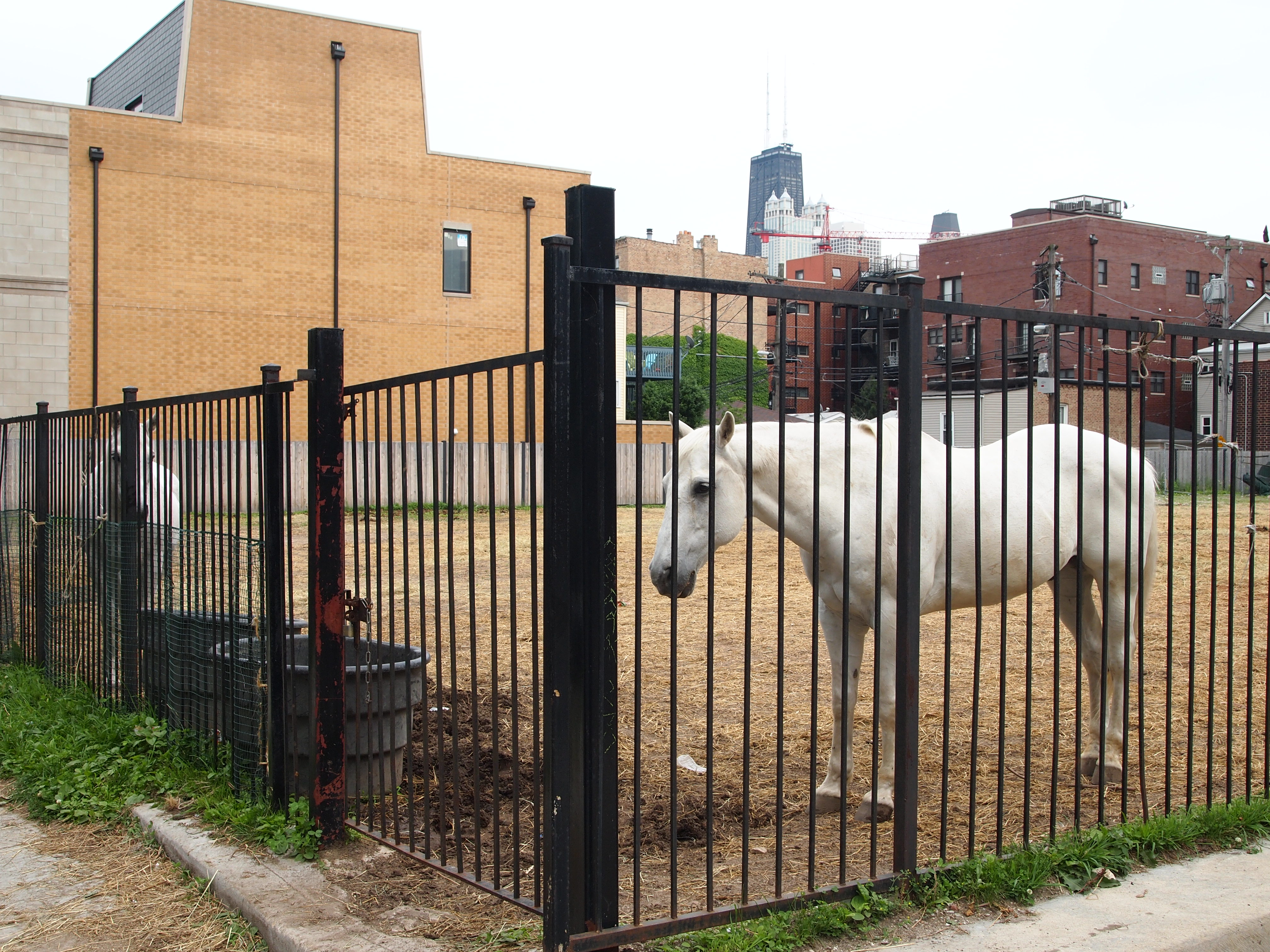
Horses in a field next to Noble Horse Theater in 2011. Note the John Hancock Building in the background

Current cultural amenities in the neighborhood include Old Town Triangle Art Center, and the annual Old Town Art Fair. Noble Horse Theater stood from 1871 until a 2015 arson forced a sale in 2017, and the land was bought and built into condominiums.

In 2025, an Oktoberfest started.

== Education ==
Chicago Public Schools (CPS) operates public schools for the area.

Manierre K–8 School is in "Sedville", a gang territory area in Old Town. As of 2013, it was considered a low-performing school. In the 2010s, CPS considered merging Jenner K–8 in Cabrini-Green and Manierre together, but concerns involving students crossing gang territorial lines meant that both schools remained open.

== Notable residents ==
- Dennis Farina
- Polo G
- The Deep 3 Podcast (Isaac Gutierrez, Muhamed Coker (Mo), Donnavan Smoot (Don) and Bryan Solis (Bzolz)

== See also ==
- German immigration
- Luxembourgers in Chicago
- National Register of Historic Places listings in North Side Chicago
