= Luxembourgish Americans =

Americans of Luxembourgish birth or descent

Lëtzebuerger Amerikaner (Luxembourgish)
- (Luxembourg) (United States)

Total population
- 39,927 (2025)

Regions with significant populations
- Illinois · Wisconsin · Michigan • Minnesota · Iowa · California · South Dakota · Ohio · Pennsylvania · New York · Florida · Indiana · Kansas · Missouri · Louisiana

Languages
- American English · Luxembourgish · German · French · Yiddish · Hebrew

Religion
- Roman Catholicism · Judaism · Lutheranism

Related ethnic groups
- German Americans · Belgian Americans · French Americans · Swiss Americans

Luxembourgish Americans are Americans of Luxembourgish ancestry. According to the United States' 2000 census, there were 45,139 Americans of full or partial Luxembourgish descent. In 1940, the number of Americans with Luxembourgish ancestry was around 100,000.

The first families from Luxembourg arrived in the United States, around 1842, fleeing from the overpopulation and economic change in the newly independent country. They worked in the field, as was traditional in their country.

Luxembourger Americans are overwhelmingly concentrated in the Midwest, where most originally settled in the 19th century. In the 2000 census, the states with the largest self-reported Luxembourger American populations were Illinois (6,963), Wisconsin (6,580), Minnesota (5,867), Iowa (5,624), and California (2,824).

== History ==
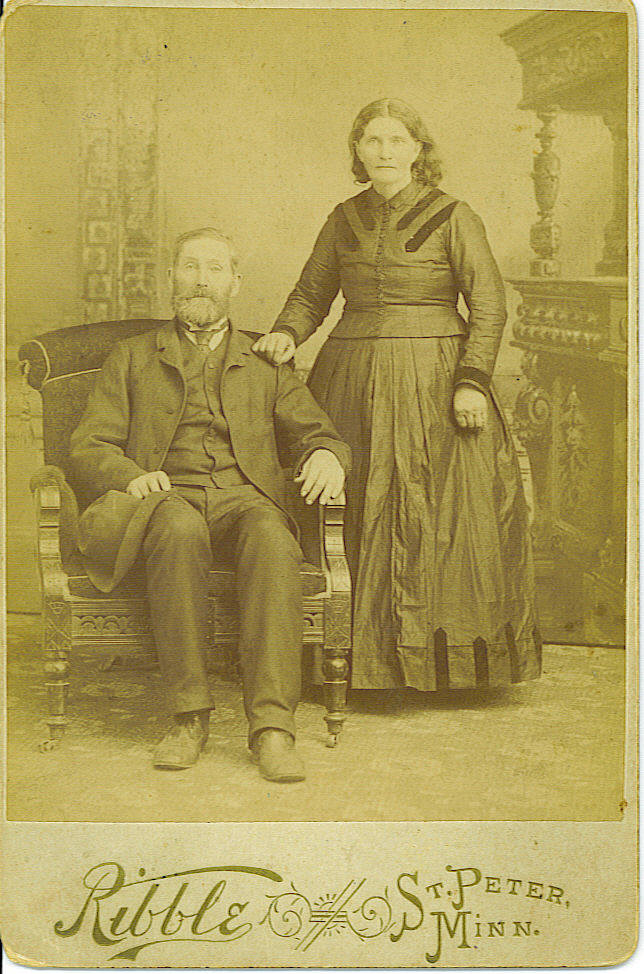
A Luxembourgish American couple from Wormeldange, Luxembourg, photographed in Minnesota circa 1890.

Between the mid-19th century and the early 20th century, approximately one-third of the Luxembourgish population emigrated. Luxembourg was, at the time, a poor country with an economy dominated by agriculture. The United States was a popular destination for Luxembourgers, as it was for many other European emigrants of the period. The number of Luxembourgers who immigrated to the US in the 19th century is thought to be around 60,000–70,000.

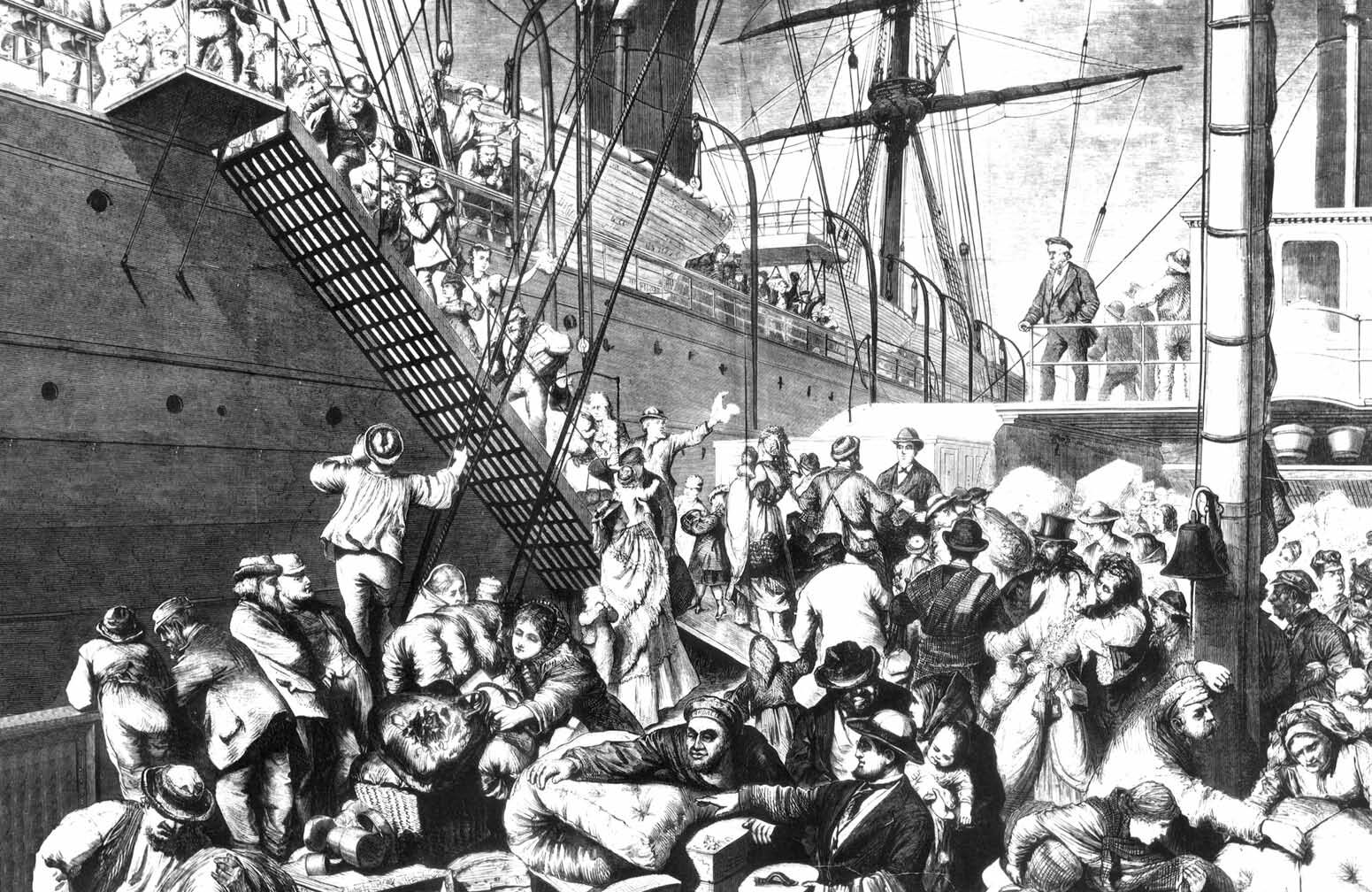
Emigrants leaving for the United States in the German port of Hamburg, 1874

Substantial Luxembourgish emigration to America took off from about 1845, for several reasons. Advances in medicine caused the rate of infant mortality to decline. This resulted in overpopulation. The lack of work in industry led many to despair. The country could no longer feed its population. In the large families of the time, the dividing up of inheritances led to fragmentation of land ownership. The portion of each child was reduced to a few hectares, which was barely enough to feed a family. Selling one's portion to the elder brother, however, provided enough money for the other siblings to pay for the voyage to America and to start a new life there.

Traveling was becoming easier in this period as well. Previously, it had taken as long to go from Luxembourg to Paris as from there to America. After a while, the news came to Europe that there was much unused land available in America. The Homestead Act offered fertile land for low prices. Many therefore took the step of attempting a new start, since staying in one's home country would mean death by starvation.

Luxembourgers arriving in the United States would not necessarily be registered as such by the authorities, but instead as Belgians or Germans. After arriving in New York, Luxembourgers tended to move on to Chicago, as well as Iowa, Minnesota, and Wisconsin. A small number stayed in New York.

In 1871, just after the Great Chicago Fire parishioners of St. Michael's Church in Chicago formed the first Luxembourger American organization in the United States, the Luxemburger Unterstützungsverein (Luxembourg Mutual Aid Society). Other organizations followed including the Luxembourg Bruderbund and the Luxembourg American Cultural Society.

Nearly 1000 Luxembourgish Americans fought for the Union Army during the Civil War, including whole companies of Luxembourgish descendents from Wisconsin, Iowa and Minnesota.

== Notable people ==
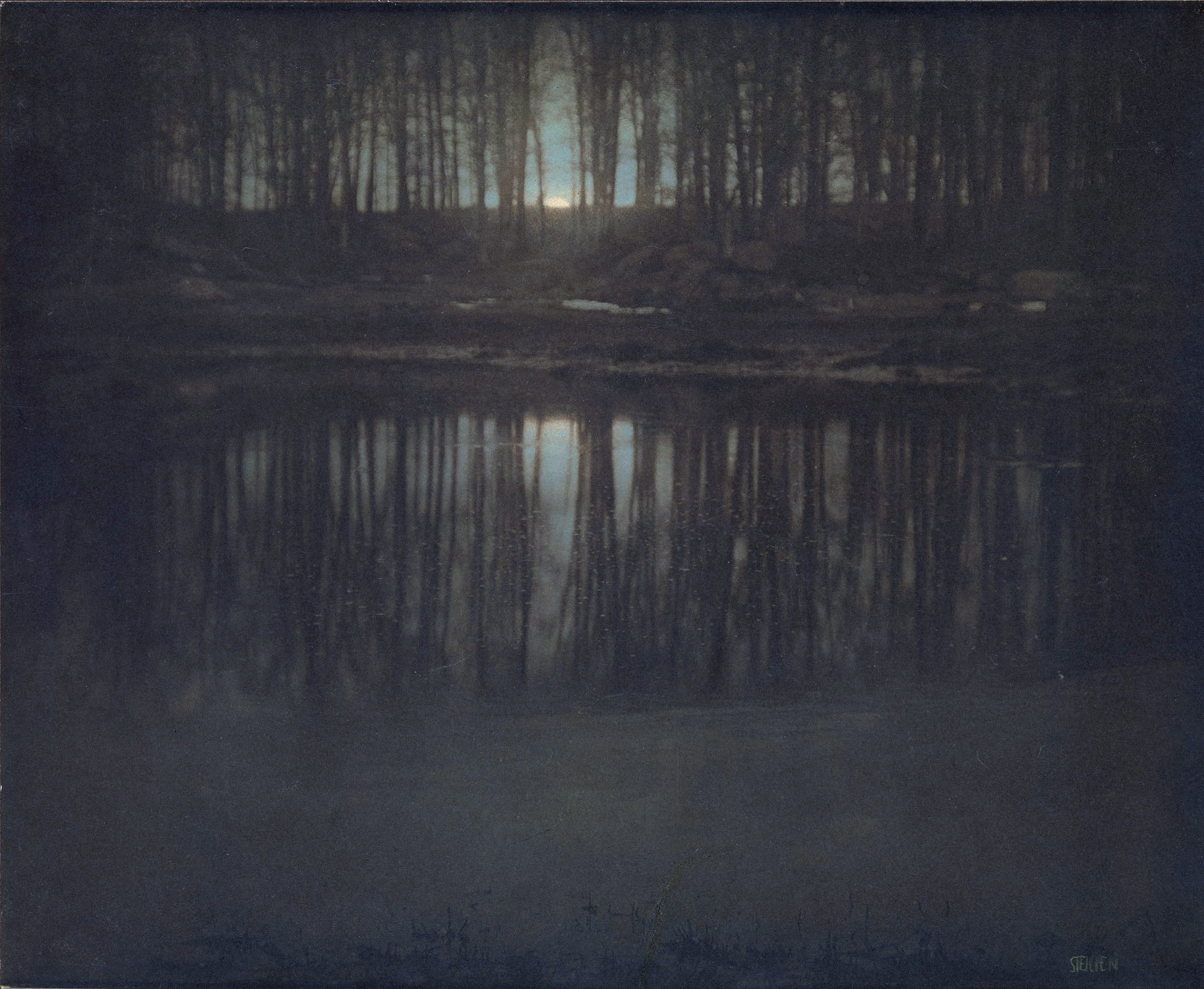
The Pond—Moonlight by Edward Steichen, one of the most expensive photographs ever sold

- René Arend (1928–2016), McDonald's first executive chef
- John W. Beschter (1763–1842), Jesuit missionary and briefly president of Georgetown College
- Chris Evert (born 1954), tennis player and winner of 21 Grand Slam titles
- Red Faber (1888–1976), baseball player and Baseball Hall of Fame inductee
- Hugo Gernsback (1884–1967), inventor and science fiction writer
- Raymond E. Goedert (1927–2023), Auxiliary Bishop emeritus of the Roman Catholic Archdiocese of Chicago
- Dennis Hastert (1942–2026), Republican politician and Speaker of the United States House of Representatives
- Theodore Hesburgh (1917–2015), priest and academic leader, former president of the University of Notre Dame, South Bend, Indiana
- Paul O. Husting (1866–1917), Democratic politician and former United States Senator for Wisconsin
- Vincent Kartheiser (born 1979), actor known for playing Connor in Angel and Pete Campbell in Mad Men
- Richard F. Kneip (1933–1987), Democratic politician and former Governor of South Dakota
- Paul Lauterbur (1929–2007), chemist and winner of the Nobel Prize in Physiology or Medicine
- John L. May (1922–1994), clergyman of the Roman Catholic Church; served as Bishop of the Roman Catholic Archdiocese of Mobile and then as Archbishop of the Roman Catholic Archdiocese of St. Louis, died in office
- Arno Mayer (1926-2023), historian and professor at Princeton University
- Nicholas Muller (1836–1917), Democratic politician and former United States Representative from New York
- Gene Scholz (1917–2005), professional basketball player
- Edward Steichen (1879–1973), photographer, painter, art gallery and museum curator
- Alex Wagner (born 1977), journalist and author
- Tim Walz (born 1964), governor of Minnesota, 2024 Democratic Party nominee for vice president.
- David Meunier (born 1973), film and television actor.
- Matthew Woll (1880–1956), trade unionist and former Vice President of the AFL-CIO
- Loretta Young (1913–2000), actress and Best Actress Academy Award winner
- Bernard J. Cigrand, dentist and father of flag day

== See also ==
- European Americans
- Luxembourg Brotherhood of America
- Luxembourgers
- Luxembourgish Brazilians
- Luxembourgish Canadians
- Luxembourg–United States relations
- Belgian Americans
- Dutch Americans
- French Americans
- German Americans
