= St. Michael's Church, Old Town, Chicago =

Catholic church in Chicago, US

Coordinates: 41.9123°N 87.6397°W

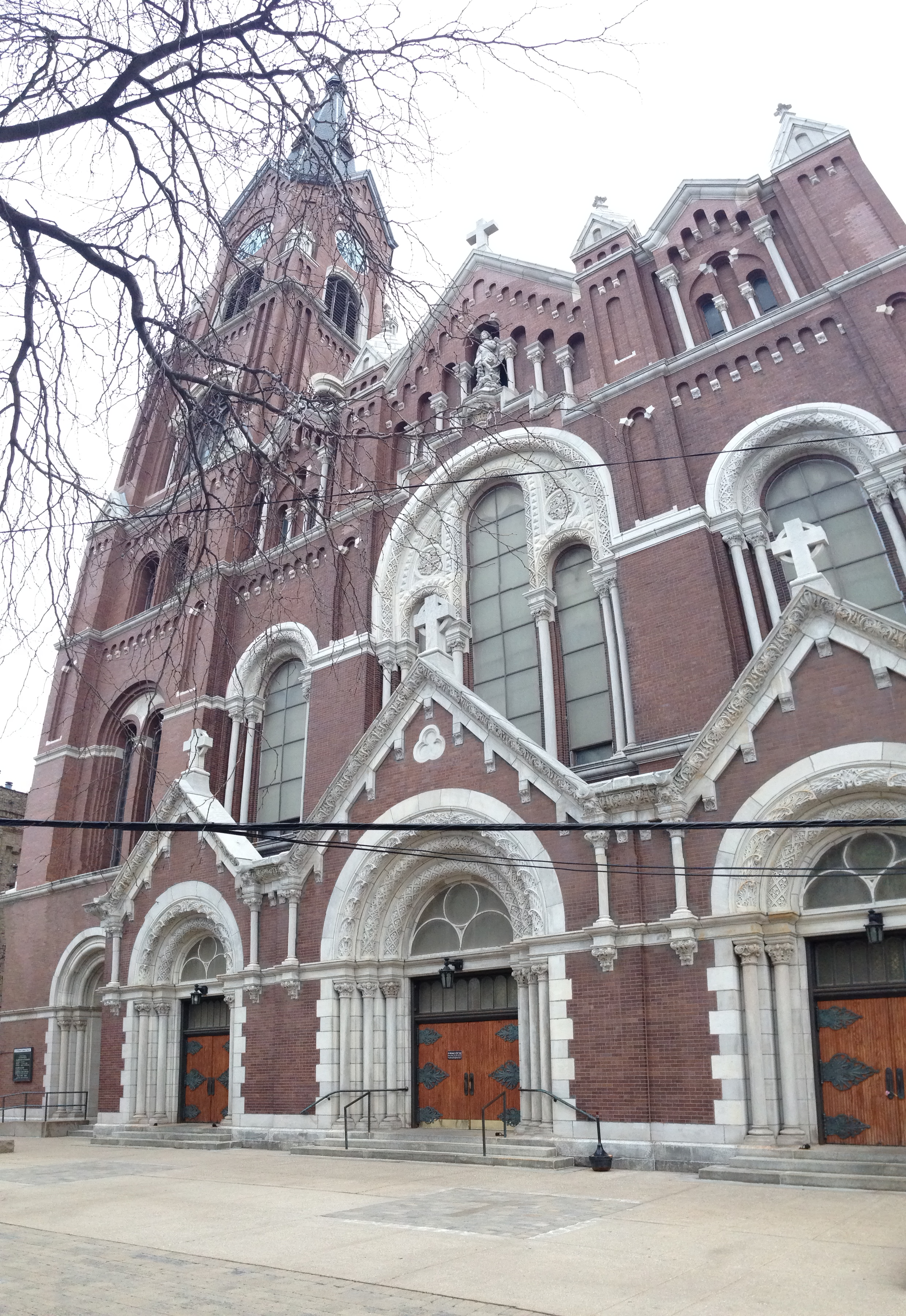
View of the front of St. Michael's Church

St. Michael's Church in the Old Town neighborhood of Chicago is a Catholic church staffed by the Redemptorist order of priests.

== History ==
The parish was founded to minister to German and Luxembourgish Catholic immigrants in 1852 with its first wooden church completed that year at a cost of $750 (including the bell). The building stands at the intersection of Eugenie Street and Cleveland Avenue. The church was built as a haven for German immigrants who were outcasts in Old Chicago. In addition, the town's main church, St. Joseph's Church, was overcrowded. The Redemptorists were invited to administer the parish in 1860 and a large brick church was finished in 1869. When completed, its tower made it the tallest building in Chicago and the United States, a distinction it held until the old Chicago Board of Trade Building was completed in 1885.

The church was one of seven buildings to 'survive' the path of the Great Chicago Fire of 1871, albeit heavily damaged. While most of Old Chicago's infrastructure was made of wood, the church was made of brick which helped it survive the fire. Portions of the building survived—the stone walls of St. Michael's being the only structures standing in the Old Town area. The church was quickly rebuilt.

In 1871, just after the Great Chicago Fire, members of the parish formed the first Luxembourgish-American organization in the United States, the Luxemburger Unterstuetzungs Verien (Luxembourg Mutual Aid Society).

There is a saying in Chicago that if you can hear the bells of St. Michael's, you are in Old Town.

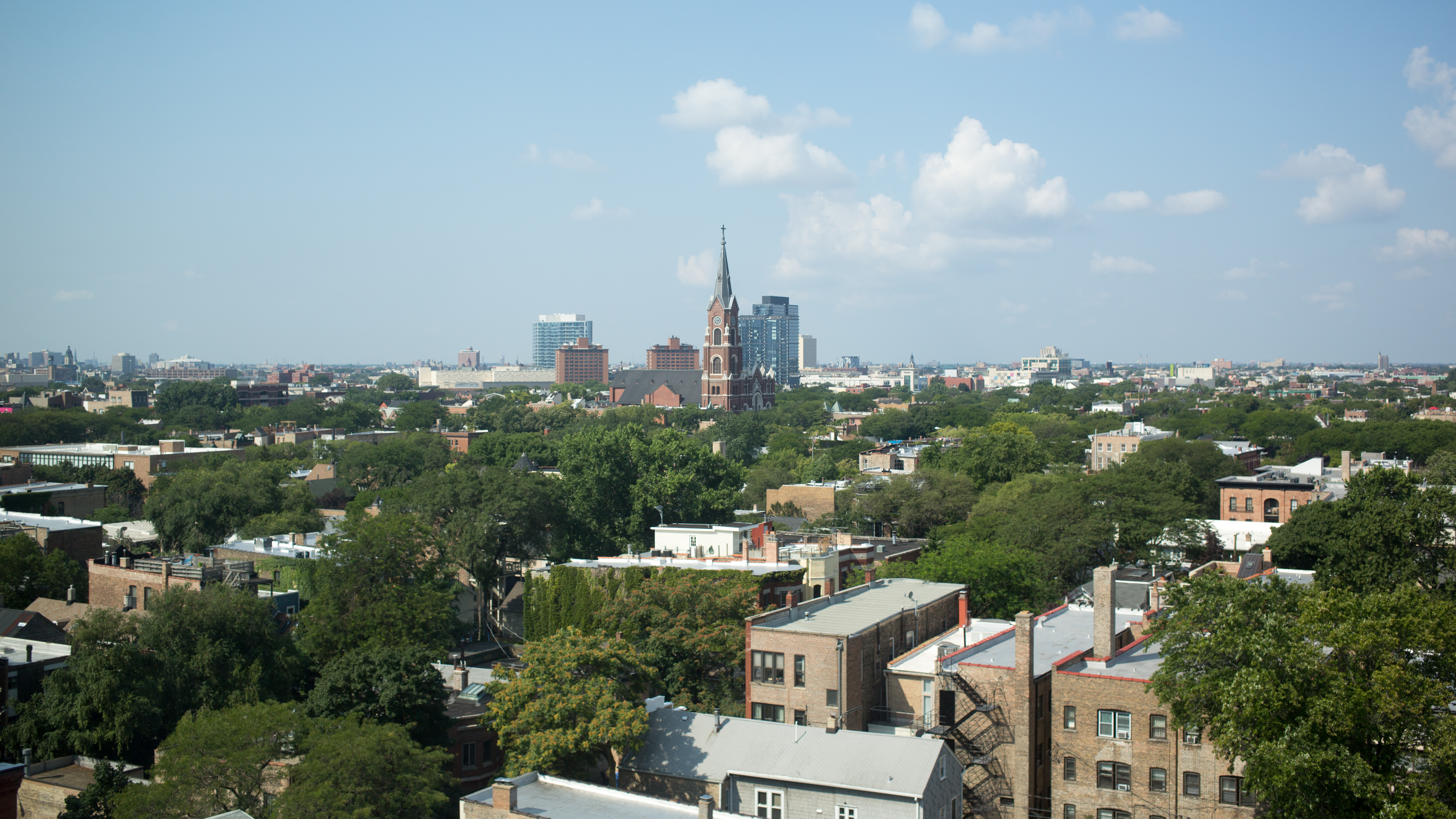
St. Michael's Church (center) in Old Town in 2015. Many claims state that hearing distance from its bells indicate the borders of Old Town

When Mayor Richard J. Daley's urban renewal program began, it was the Old Town Triangle Organization of the Lincoln Park Conservation Association that took the lead in promoting urban renewal. St. Michael's like many other neighborhood institutions took advantage of the program to rehab and to expand.

== Gallery ==
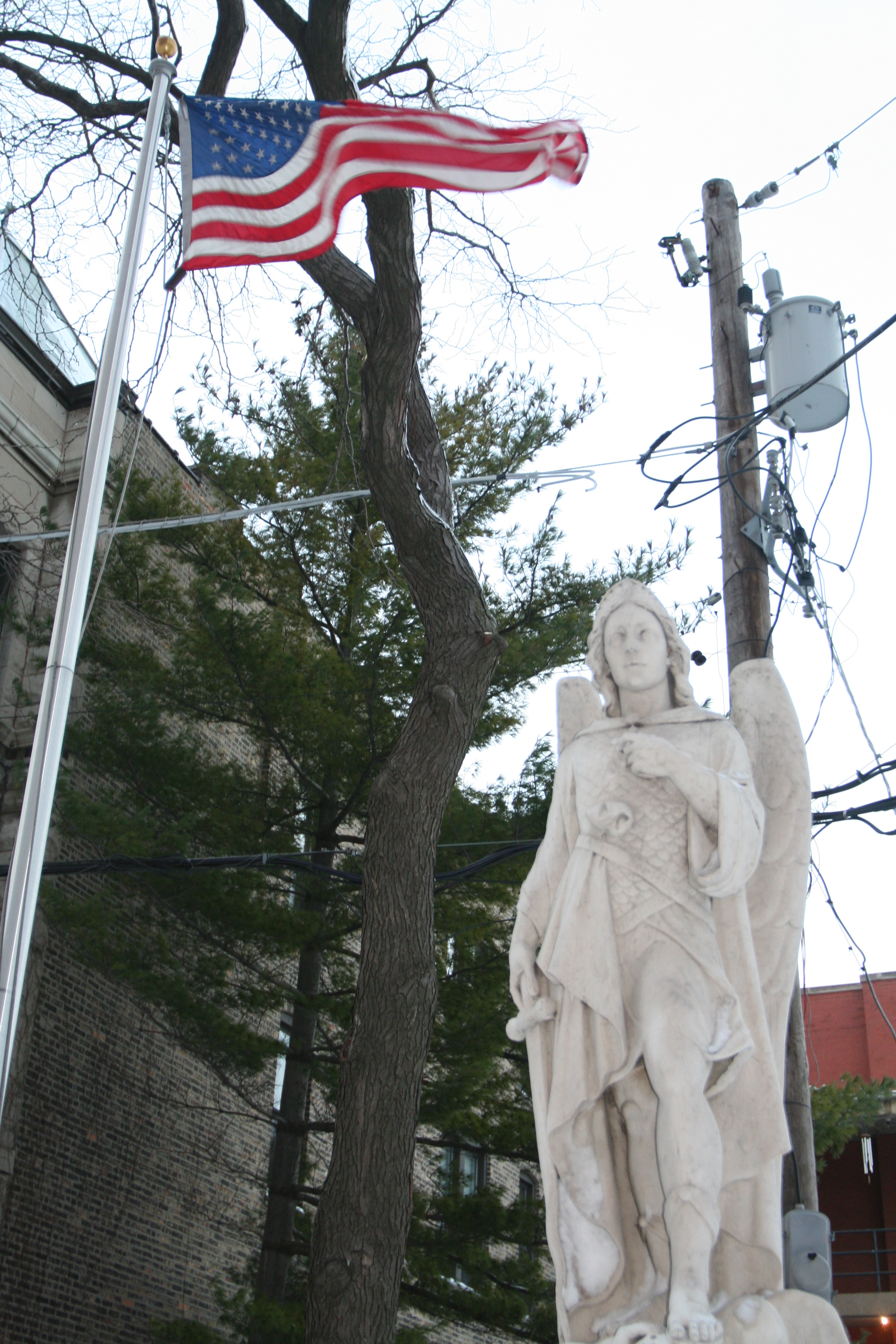

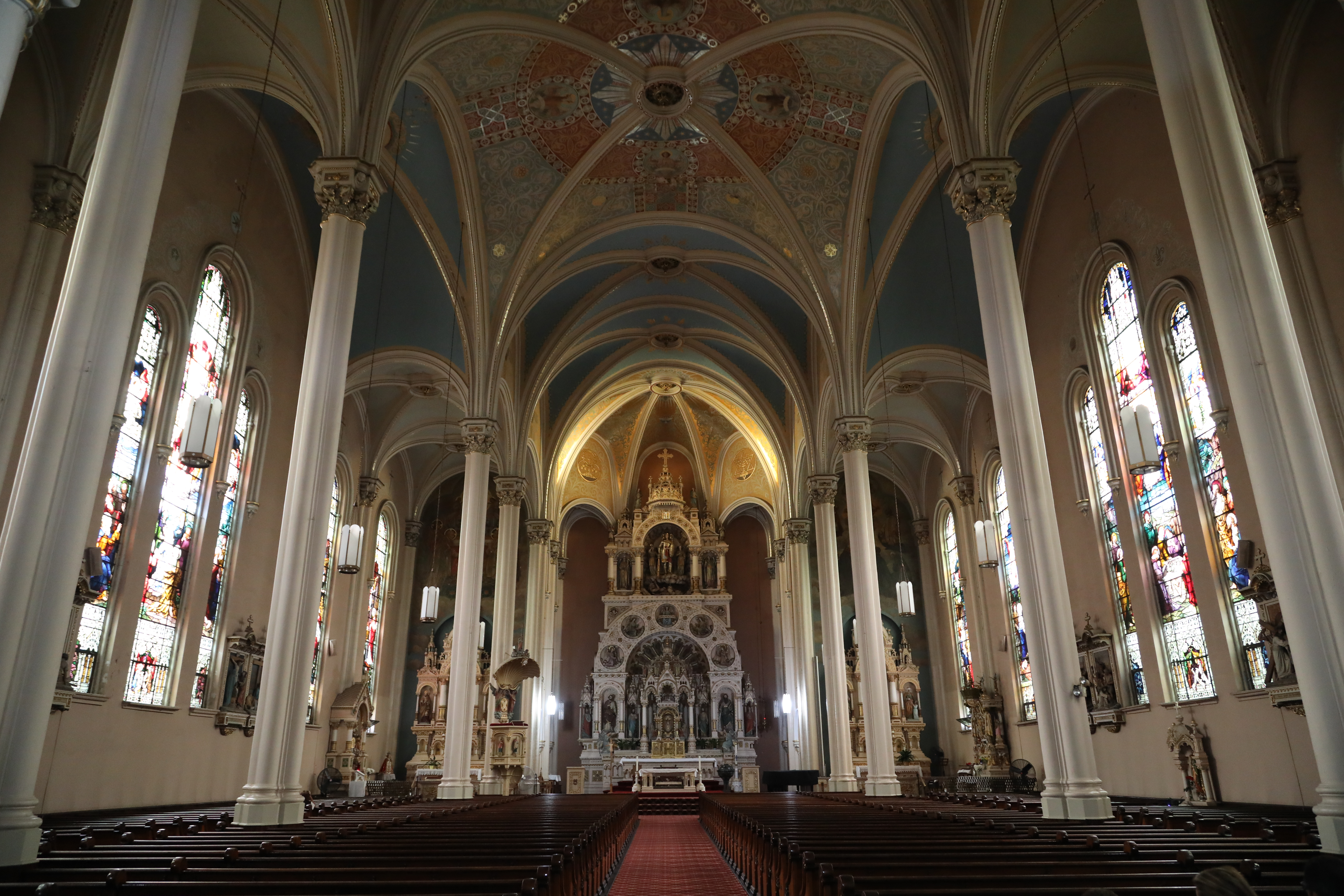
St Michaels Church interior in Chicago 2018

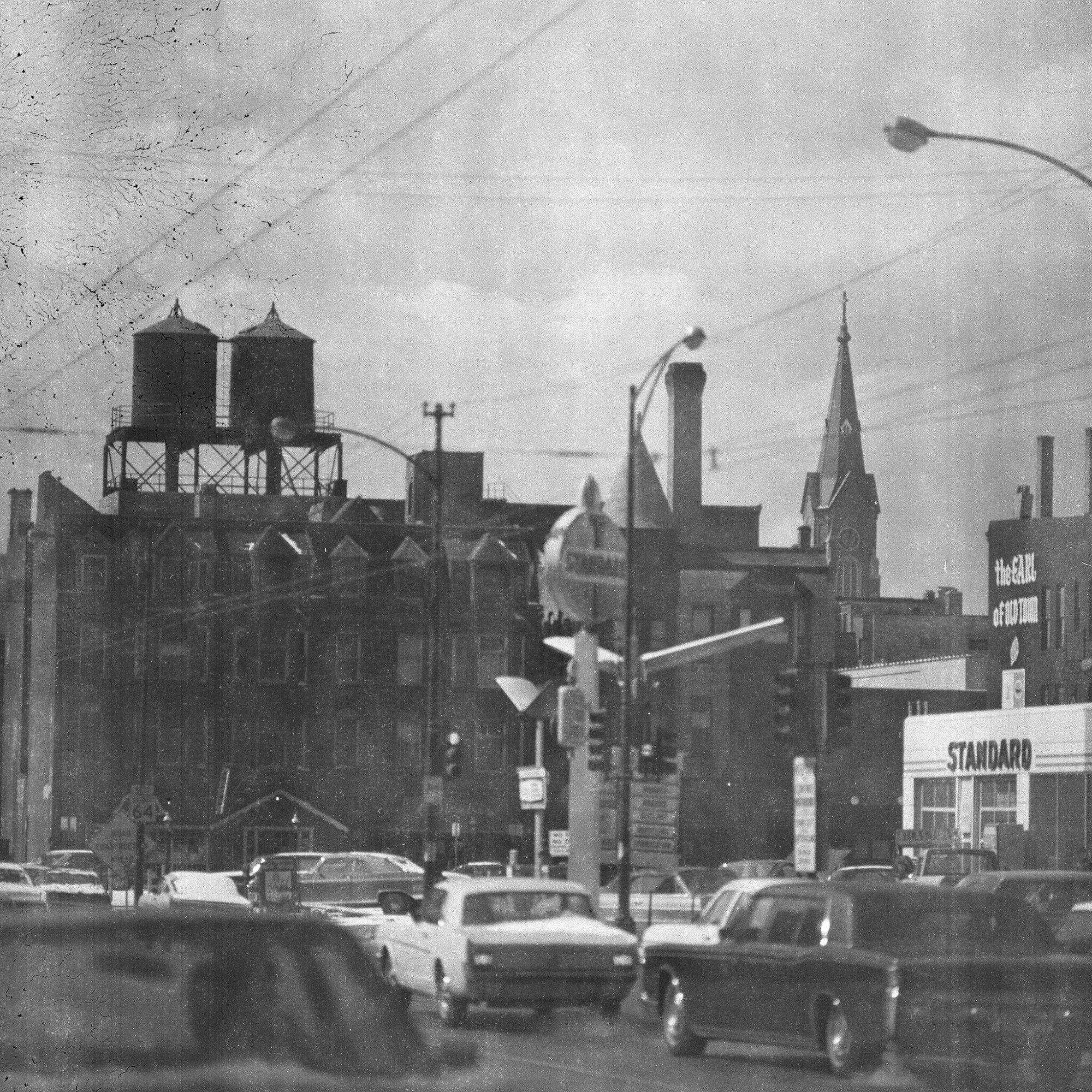
The church as seen from Wells and North Avenue in the late 1960s

== See also ==
- Saint Michael: Roman Catholic traditions and views
