= Schueberfouer =

Luxembourg City funfair

Coordinates: 49.6169°N 6.1237°E

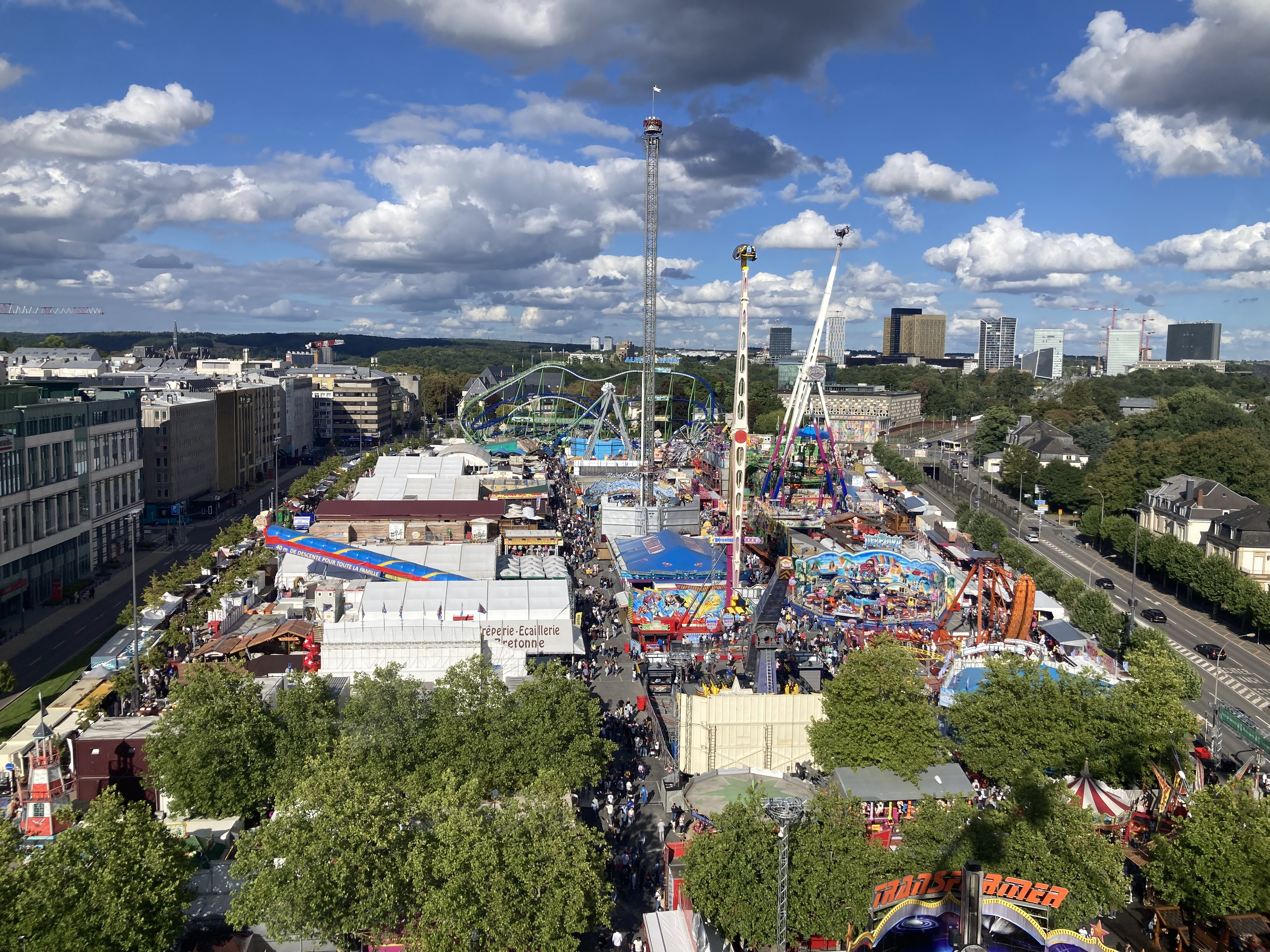
Schueberfouer funfair in Luxembourg, 2025

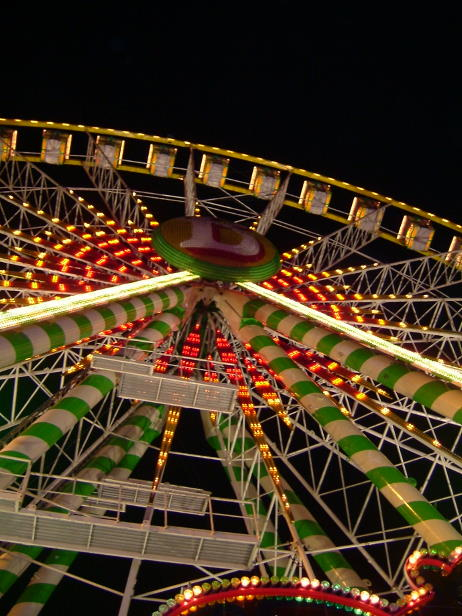
The Ferris Wheel

The Schueberfouer is the annual Luxembourg City funfair held on the Glacis square in the city district of Limpertsberg. The 681st edition of the largest amusement park in the wider region beyond national borders started on 23 August 2023 and ended on 11 September 2023.

Traditionally, the Schueberfouer starts on Wednesday, Thursday or Friday before Saint Bartholomew's day (24 August) and closes on Monday, Tuesday or Wednesday before 12 September in order to last 20 days every year. In 2010, the fair comprised 184 attractions including 27 major rides, 13 children's rides and 54 restaurants and snack bars. In 2018, the fair was expected to attract over 2 million visitors.

== History ==
John I of Luxembourg, better known as John the Blind, King of Bohemia and Count of Luxembourg, founded the Schueberfouer on 20 October 1340.

The founding document stated it was to begin on the eve of the feast of St Bartholomew and last for a full eight days.

Even today, it remains linked to St Bartholomew's day, 24 August, the traditional opening date.

The name Schueberfouer is thought to originate probably from the name of the market place where it was first held: the Schuedbuerg, today's "Plateau du St Esprit" (in English: Holy Spirit Plateau; in Luxembourgish: Helleggeescht-Plateau), which serves nowadays as residential location for the highest courts of justice of Luxembourg. ("Fouer" is the Luxembourgish word for "fair".)

Another unconfirmed theory links the term "Schueber" to the old German word "Schober" (in English: barn), which would refer to the initial agricultural role of the fair. Indeed, for almost 450 years, the fair was mainly a large and regionally very important market for everything from agricultural products and livestock to cloth, pottery and other household items.

After the Limpertsberg wood had been removed to improve the defensive capabilities of the city, the fair moved in 1610 to the Glacis, a huge open space beyond the westward fortifications of the fortress of Luxembourg which were dismantled after 1867 and replaced by the City Park.

During the 18th century, shows and games became part of the fair but it was not until the early 20th century that a Ferris wheel and a rollercoaster first appeared.

== Literature ==
- Anonym, o.J. Schueberfouer History / Den Uersprong vun der Schueberfouer.
- Kayser, Steve, 2007. Schueberfouer - Déi Lëtzebuerger Traditioun zënter 1340. Editions Schortgen.
- Margue, Michel & Michel Pauly, 1990. «Pour ce que nous desirrons moult le profit et avancement de nostre pays et especiaulment de nostre ville de Luxembourg». Kurze Bemerkungen zum wirtschaftspolitischen Umfeld der Gründung der Schobermesse". In: Pauly, Michel (Hrsg.), 1990. Schueberfouer 1340-1990. Untersuchungen zu Markt, Gewerbe und Stadt in Mittelalter und Neuzeit. Publications du CLUDEM 1: 47-61. Luxembourg.
- nos cahiers - Lëtzebuerger Zäitschrëft fir Kultur: "Schueberfouer spécial", 2/3 2008 29. Joer, editions saint-paul.
- Oppel, Pia, 2008. "D'Schueberfouer". In: Kmec, S., B. Majerus, M. Margue & P. Peporte (éditeurs), 2008. Lieux de mémoire au Luxembourg. Erinnerungsorte in Luxemburg, 2. Editioun, S. 317–322. éditions saint-paul, Lëtzebuerg. ISBN 978-2-87963-705-1.
- Kollmann, Cristian (2010-09-01). "Etymologie von Schuebermëss, -fouer". infolux - Forschungsportal zum Luxemburgische (in German). Archived from the original on 2012-01-11.
- Pauly, Michel (Hrsg.), 1990. Schueberfouer 1340-1990. Untersuchungen zu Markt, Gewerbe und Stadt in Mittelalter und Neuzeit. Publications du CLUDEM 1. Les publications de la Banque et Caisse d’épargne de l’État. 152 S. Impr. Saint-Paul, Luxembourg.
- Schroeder, Jean, 1990. "L'acte de fondation de la 'Schueberfouer'", In: Pauly, Michel (Hrsg.), 1990. Schueberfouer 1340-1990. Untersuchungen zu Markt, Gewerbe und Stadt in Mittelalter und Neuzeit. Publications du CLUDEM 1: 41–46. Luxembourg.

== See also ==
- Schobermesse
