= Luxembourg Brotherhood of America =

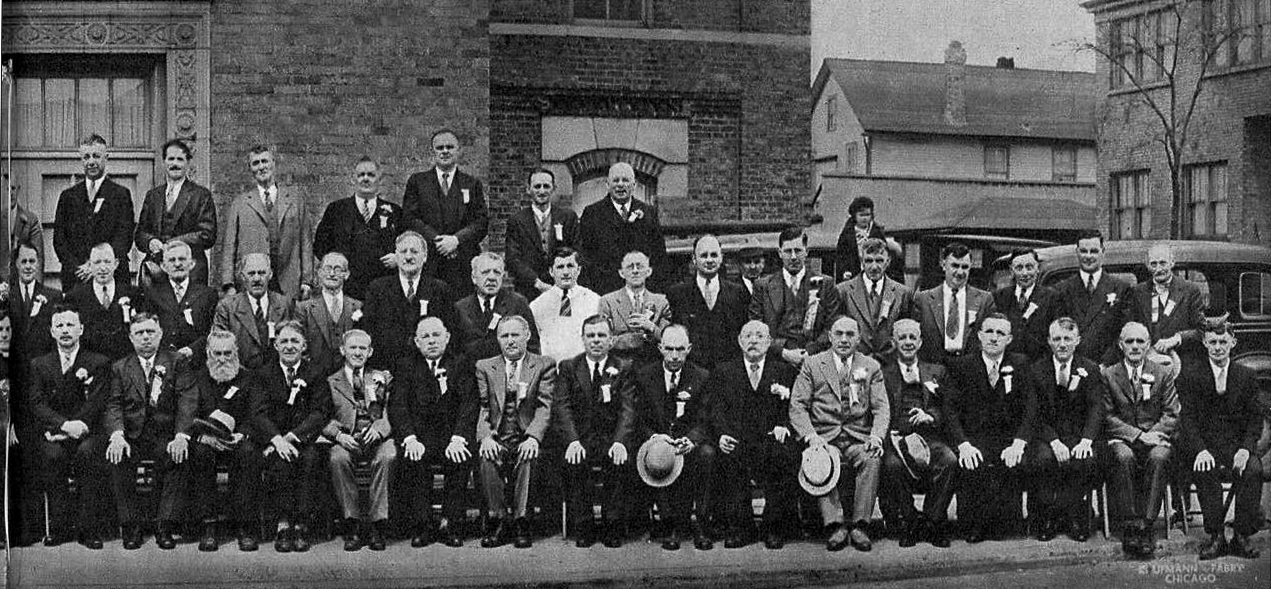
Group photo of Luxembourg Bruderbund of Chicago in 1935.

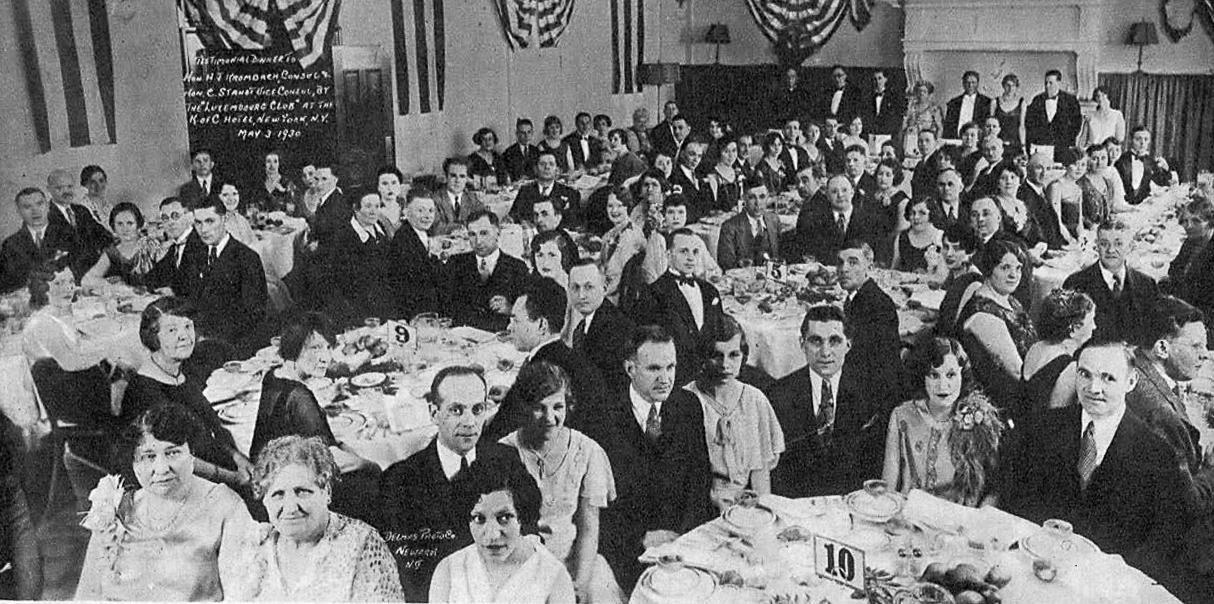
Group photo of Luxembourg Bruderbund of New York in 1935.

The Luxembourg Brotherhood of America, (L.B.A.) is the oldest Luxembourg-American organization in the United States. It was founded in 1887 as a fraternal organization on Chicago's south side. Today, it consists of four sections located in the Chicago area and is dedicated to maintaining strong ties between the Grand-Duchy of Luxembourg and its American emigrants and their descendants.

The L.B.A. offers friendship, camaraderie and celebrations for those of Luxembourg heritage, family, friends, and those interested in the Luxembourg culture. The L.B.A. supports local events and works closely with the Luxembourg American Cultural Society in Belgium, Wisconsin. The Luxembourg Brotherhood of America funds cultural and educational exchanges, promotes ethnic relationships, family connections and visitation among Luxembourg, member families and government officials. The organization offers its benefits to anyone who applies for membership regardless of ethnicity or gender.

== History ==
The organization was founded on October 23, 1887, in Chicago as the “Luxemburger Bruderbund”. There were 25 men present at that first meeting, all who paid $0.25 initiation fee each to join the club. The first social gatherings were a dance in January 1888 followed by a picnic in the spring. On December 8, 1888, the Luxembourg Bruderbund was incorporated by the State of Illinois as a benevolent, charitable and sociable organization, which offered death benefits to its members. By 1896 the organization had “sections” in Illinois, Iowa, Wisconsin and Pennsylvania.

At many of the early meetings Luxembourgish was the official language, until May 2, 1915, where at the 19th Convention, English was adopted as the official language for all future meetings.

== Events ==
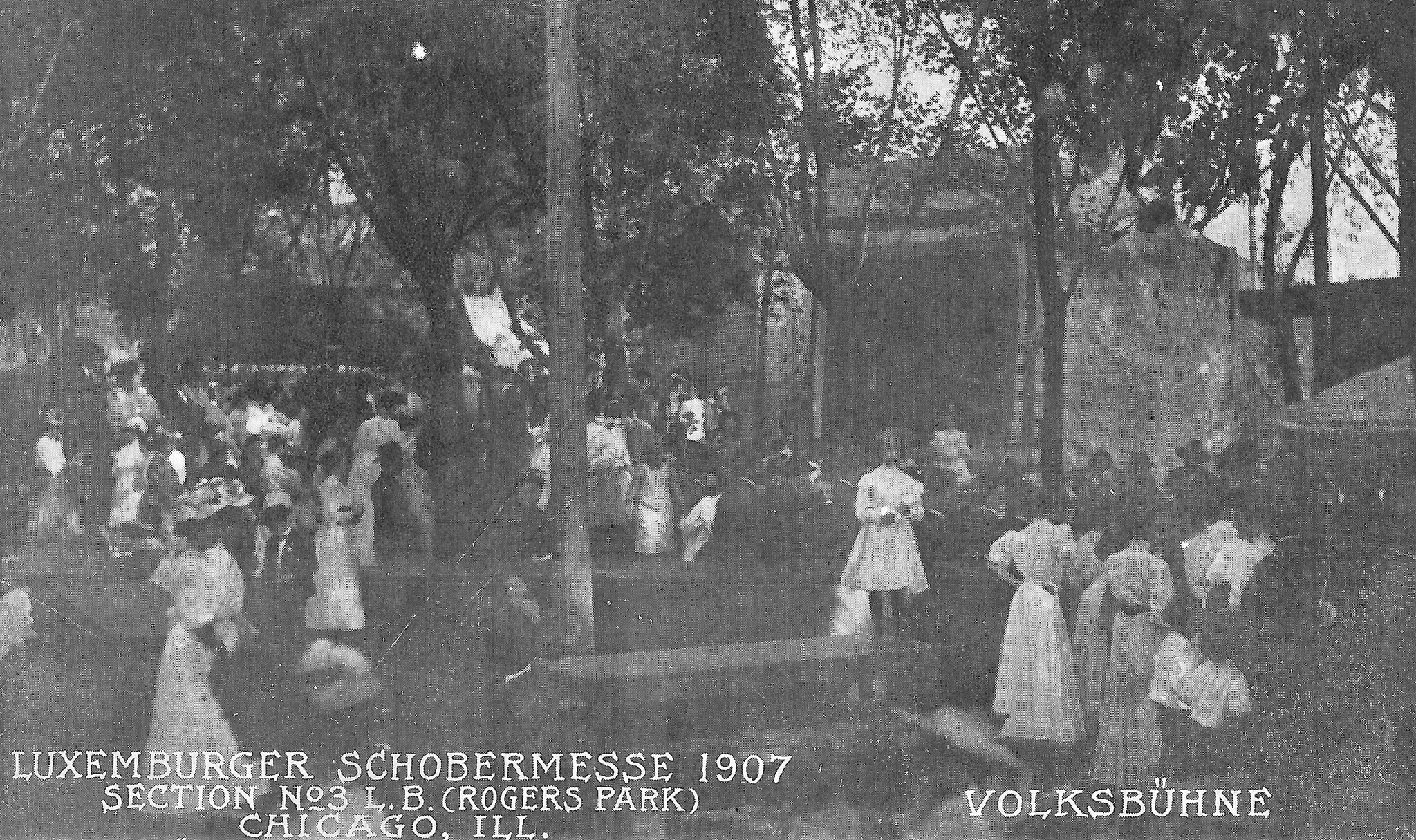
Schobermesse in Rogers Park, Chicago, 1907

The Brotherhood holds the following events each year:

1. An annual Mass celebrating Our Lady of Consolation, Patroness of Luxembourg.
2. Sauerbraten Dinner in the Spring.
3. The National Convention in May.
4. The Schobermesse / National Day in June based on the Schueberfouer holiday started in 1340 by John the Blind in Luxembourg.

== Organization ==
=== The Grand Lodge ===
The Luxembourg Brotherhood of America is organized into classes of members called Sections. The L.B.A. is managed by and under the direction of a board of directors which is known as the Grand Lodge. The Grand Lodge consists of elected Grand Officers and one Grand Representative that is elected by each Section. Each Grand Officer must be a member in good standing of one of the L.B.A.’s sections.

The Supreme Assembly (Convention) is an annual meeting held by the members of all of the Sections, and is held at a place designated by the Grand Lodge on the third Thursday in May at the hour of 6:00 PM or at such other time as the Grand Lodge may appoint in writing. The meeting is known as the Supreme Assembly. Only those members who are in good standing in their Sections may attend and vote on matters before the Supreme Assembly.

Those Members attending the annual meeting shall constitute a quorum. If a quorum is present the affirmative vote of a majority of the votes represented at the meeting shall be the act of the members. Each member in attendance, regardless of section, shall be entitled to one vote on each matter to come before the Supreme Assembly. Neither proxy voting nor cumulative voting shall be permitted. Voting on all matters, except election of the Grand Officers as hereinafter provided, shall be by voice vote, unless otherwise decided by the Supreme Assembly.

The Grand Lodge meets every three quarterly to attend to the affairs of the Brotherhood. The presence of five (5) members shall constitute a quorum. Any Officer who is absent three (3) times in succession may be replaced by the Grand President with the concurrence of Grand Lodge.

=== The Grand Lodge Officers ===
GRAND PRESIDENT - The Grand President is the principal executive officer of the Brotherhood and presides over all meetings of the Grand Lodge and the Supreme Assembly. In addition, the Grand President: 1) Signs all documents which require his or her signature; 2) Issues charters to new Sections; 3) With the majority approval of the Grand Lodge, orders an examination of the books of any Section; 4) With the majority approval of the Grand Lodge, suspends any Officer or member of a Committee, or an Officer of a Section, and with the majority approval of the Grand Lodge, fills the vacancy; 5) Executes any contracts, deeds, mortgages, bonds or other instruments which the Grand Lodge has authorized; 6) Appoints members to Committees. It is the duty of the Grand President to install the Officers of the Sections according to the adopted rituals, or if prevented from doing so, shall appoint a Grand Representative to perform this duty.

GRAND VICE-PRESIDENT - The Grand Vice-President assists the Grand President, and performs all the duties of the Grand President in the absence of the Grand President and such other duties as may be assigned to him or to her by either the Grand President or Grand Lodge. In the event of the death, disability or resignation of the Grand President, the Grand Vice-President shall automatically succeed to the office of the Grand President to serve the balance of his or her predecessor’s term and shall thereafter appoint, with the majority approval of the Grand Lodge, a Grand Vice-President to serve the balance of his or her predecessor’s term.

GRAND SECRETARY - The Grand Secretary: 1) Keeps a true record of all the meetings of the Supreme Assembly and Grand Lodge; 2) Acts as custodian of all books, documents, seal and any other property which may come into his or her possession during the term of his or her office, and delivers same to his or her successor after his or her installation; 3) Issues the call for the meetings of the Grand Lodge and Supreme Assembly and informs the Sections of any other official acts of the Grand Lodge; 4) Issues the charters and membership certificates, keeps a record of all the members and shall report to the Supreme Assembly about the initiation of new members, rejected candidates, suspended or expelled members; 5) Keeps a correct list of all charters issued to the Sections, the telephone numbers and addresses of all Section members and of the Officers of the Sections; 6) Reports to the Supreme Assembly about the conduct of his or her office during the preceding year; 7) Keeps a record of the individual bonds of the Officers and maintains said bonds in his or her custody; 8) Performs any other duties which may be entrusted to him or her by the Grand Lodge or the Supreme Assembly in accordance with these By-Laws.

GRAND TREASURER - The Grand Treasurer is the principal accounting and financial Officer of the Brotherhood and: 1) Receives all money derived from all sources; 2) Keeps a separate account of all income and expenses; 3) Gives a report to the Supreme Assembly and delivers the books and records in his or her possession to the Grand Trustees for audit and revision.

TRUSTEES - The Trustees: 1) Supervise all the assets of the Brotherhood; 2) Invest the funds as ordered by the Supreme Assembly or the Grand Lodge; 3) Conduct an annual audit of the books of the Grand Secretary and Treasurer, Committees and Officers which may receive or disburse any money of and for the Brotherhood prior to the meeting of the Supreme Assembly; 4) Be the custodian of all assets of the Brotherhood.

GRAND HISTORIAN - In order to maintain the historical records and photos of the Brotherhood, there is hereby established the office of the Grand Historian. The Grand President appoints the Grand Historian at the Supreme Assembly and the Grand Historian is the custodian of all of the records of the Brotherhood which is not be needed for current operations and maintains them so as to be preserved for future reference. The Grand Historian selects, with the consent of the Grand Lodge, a local historical society to be the depository of the historical records of the Brotherhood upon such terms as may be negotiated.

SERGEANT—AT-ARMS - The Sergeant-at-Arms is appointed by the Grand President prior to the convening of the Supreme Assembly and performs all such duties which may be requested by the Grand President.

The GRAND REPRESENTATIVES - The Grand Representatives are elected to the Grand Lodge by their respective Sections at the Section meeting immediately prior to the meeting of the Supreme Assembly for a term of one year and have one vote on all matters to come before the Grand Lodge. Among their additional duties they: 1) Establish a harmonious feeling between the Sections and Grand Lodge; 2) Report on Section activities to the Supreme Assembly or Grand Lodge; 3) Consider ways and means of increasing the numbers of new members; 4) Advise the Sections on matters for the good and welfare of the Brotherhood. The Grand President may order one or all of the Grand Representatives to visit one or all of the Sections as he may select. A Grand Representative may not hold any other Grand Lodge office while serving as Grand Representative.

=== Sections ===
There are currently four existing Active Sections in the Luxembourg Brotherhood of America. Sections 3, 7, 8 & 15. All four Sections celebrate Luxembourg heritage, remaining closely aligned with the Luxembourg American Cultural Society in Belgium, WI.

SECTION 3 is the oldest of the four remaining sections from the Luxembourg Brunderbund, established at an organizational meeting held on October 23, 1887, on the South Side of Chicago. The section was formed in April 1897 by John Glessner, a member of Section 1, who was then living in the Rogers Park neighborhood of Chicago. On May 9, 1897, Grand Lodge President John Hankes initiated 33 men into the L.B.A. and christened them as Section 3. They were from the Rogers Park and High Ridge neighborhoods, men devoted to their greenhouse businesses and their parish, St. Henry’s on the southwest corner of Ridge Avenue and Devon Avenue in Chicago. Section 3 is now based in Glenview, IL and meets at Hackney’s on Lake St.

SECTION 7 was formed in Aurora, IL, and was admitted into the L.B.A. on Oct. 7, 1900 with Peter Weiland as their first president. They hosted the 26th LBA Convention from their Family Center in 1927. During the 90’s, when the Grand Lodge discontinued insurance benefits to all members, and partially due to distance, some sections, including 7 lost their connection with the L.B.A., however, the Aurora Brotherhood maintained their connections within the community, hosting dinners, picnics, and many other activities. In April 2013, L.B.A. Section 7 was officially re-instated into the Luxembourg Brotherhood of America.

SECTION 8 was formed in Evanston, Illinois, on February 23, 1902. Now based in Morton Grove, IL, Section 8 meets the 2nd Tuesday of every March, May, September, and November at the Morton Grove American Legion Civic Center.

SECTION 15 is based in the North and Northwest suburbs of Chicago, and is led by dedicated descendants of Luxembourg’s immigrants. Section 15 are part of the Grand Lodge which offers membership to all persons both those of Luxembourg heritage and those interested in all things Luxembourgish. Section 15's annual installation of officers dinner is held in January, and they meet quarterly on the third Wednesday of April, July and October. In the spring, there is the famous Sauerbraten Dinner with raffles, door prizes, the Wheel of Sausage and dancing.

=== Section Membership ===
To be entitled to the benefits of the L.B.A., one must be a member in good standing of a Section and may hold membership in more than one Section of the Brotherhood. However, a member of two or more Sections may not hold office in more than one Section simultaneously. All Luxembourgers, male and female, their descendants and associates, may at the discretion of the Section membership become a member, providing they are not less than sixteen (16) years of age, and there are no objections as to their character. Children under the age of 16 may become auxiliary members of a Section, and there will be no charge for this distinction. Any person who wishes to join a Section may submit an application to the Section on a form approved by the Grand Lodge. Each member shall be entitled to one vote on each matter submitted to a vote of the members.

=== Section Meetings ===
A general meeting, to which every member can expect an invitation issued by the Financial Secretary, is held quarterly. Each Officer makes a report to the meeting, dealing with the specific duties of his or her office or the welfare of the Section. Five (5) members present constitute a quorum when the meeting is called to order by the President or the presiding Officer in the absence of the President. The last meeting in the calendar year shall be held for the purpose of electing Officers for the next year. No later than its April meeting, the President shall poll his or her members and determine which of them plans to attend the Supreme Assembly. All Section Officers should make every reasonable effort to attend the Supreme Assembly.

The Meeting's order of business includes: 1) Call to order; 2) Opening Ceremonies; 3) Roll Call of Officers / Introduction of Guests; 4) Reading of the minutes of the previous meeting; 5) Unfinished Business; 6) New Business; 7) Announcements; 8) Programs for the welfare of the Brotherhood; 9) Action Items; 10) Adjournment.

=== Section Officers ===
The Officers of the Sections are the President, Vice-President, Recording Secretary, Treasurer, Financial Secretary, Sergeant-at-Arms, and a Representative to the Grand Lodge who shall be known as the Grand Representative. The position(s) of Trustee(s) shall be optional with each Section and no Section shall have more than three (3) Trustees. Trustees shall be considered Officers of the Section. The Officers shall be elected for a period of one (1) year.

DUTIES OF SECTION OFFICERS:

PRESIDENT - The President presides over the regular and special meetings. If five (5) members make a written request, he or she shall call a special meeting. The President: 1) Is responsible for the orderly conduct of the business; 2) Have a vote on all matters; 3) Appoints Officers for any office left vacant by resignation or otherwise for the balance of the period of such offices. In case of the death of a member he or she shall make all reasonable efforts to attend to all such customary duties as are required.

VICE-PRESIDENT - The Vice-President performs all the duties of the President in the absence of the President. The Vice-President shall automatically succeed to the office of the President upon the death or resignation of the President.

RECORDING SECRETARY - The Recording Secretary: 1) Records the minutes of each meeting; 2) Is the custodian of all of the non-business records of the Section; 3) Maintains a roster of the members and their individual records; 4) Attends to the business correspondence of the Section; 5) Notifies the Grand Secretary of new, expelled or deceased members, or transfer of such.

TREASURER - The Treasurer: 1) Receives all the money from every source of the Section and deposits said funds in the depository chosen by the Section; 2) Pays all bills authorized by the President; 3) Issues written financial reports quarterly to Section members with copies submitted to the Grand Treasurer. At the termination of his or her office he or she turns over all the money and books to his or her successor. The duties of this office may be combined with that of the Financial Secretary and one person may hold both offices.

FINANCIAL SECRETARY - The Financial Secretary is responsible for collection and recording dues, sending out dues and meeting notices, and such other duties as the President may assign. The duties of this office may be combined with that of the Treasurer and one person may hold both offices.

SERGEANT-AT-ARMS - The Sergeant-at-Arms, or assistant, are at all times at the disposition of the President. They shall maintain order at the meetings.

TRUSTEES - The Trustees are the custodians of the property of the Section and give account for it to the Officers and members of the Section.

== See also ==
- Belgium, Wisconsin
- Luxembourg American Cultural Society
