= Luxembourgers =

Germanic ethnic group

Lëtzebuerger
- Map of the Luxembourgish diaspora in the world (includes ancestry and Luxembourger citizens from other countries). Luxembourg + 10,000 + 1,000

Total population
- c. 300,000 (2013)^{[a]} (Luxembourgish ancestry); 530,953 (2026) (Luxembourgish nationality)

Regions with significant populations
- Luxembourg c. 298,000 (2013)^{[b]} (self-identified Luxembourgers)

Languages
- Luxembourgish • German Sign Language (L1); French • German (L2)

Religion
- Predominantly Roman Catholicism
- ^{a} Upper estimate is merely a sum of all referenced figures given below.^{b} In 2013, 55.5% of the population of Luxembourg (537,039) declared sole Luxembourgish ethnic descent and nationally, while the remaining 45.5% were either of foreign descent or foreign nationals.

Luxembourgers (/ˈlʌksəmbɜːrɡərz/ LUK-səm-bur-gərz; Luxembourgish: Lëtzebuerger [ˈlətsəbu̯əjɐ]) are a Germanic ethnic group native to their nation state of Luxembourg, where they make up around half of the population. They share the culture of Luxembourg and speak Luxembourgish, a West Germanic language.

Luxembourgers were, much like Austrians and some aspects of the Swiss, historically considered a regional sub-group of ethnic Germans and viewed themselves as such until the collapse of the German Confederation. Luxembourg became independent, while remaining in personal union with the Netherlands, after the signing of the Treaty of London in 1839. The personal union proved short-lived as it was bilaterally and amicably dissolved in 1890.

Legally, all citizens of the Grand Duchy of Luxembourg are considered to be Luxembourgers per Luxembourgish law, although a distinct Germanic ethnolinguistic identification is vocally espoused and promoted. The corresponding adjective is "Luxembourgish".

== Historical background ==
Most ethnic Luxembourgers live in the Grand Duchy of Luxembourg (Luxembourgish: Lëtzebuerg), a small landlocked country in Western Europe, situated between Germany, France, and Belgium, and are of Celtic/Gallo-Roman and Germanic (Frankish) origin. Luxembourgish is the only native language of Luxembourgers (as taught by parents), although nearly all of them learn French and German in school and are able to communicate in these two languages as well from an early age on. Despite the rather small number of Luxembourgers, there is a relatively large diaspora of their people, both in Europe and elsewhere, most notably overseas in North America. Particularly, there are populations in the surrounding countries of Belgium, France, and Germany. For the most part, this is due to historic reasons, especially the three Partitions of Luxembourg, which led to former territories of Luxembourg being incorporated into each of the three surrounding countries.

As previously mentioned, there are also significant populations of Luxembourgers in the Americas, with the largest contingent being in the United States. Others migrated to the medieval Kingdom of Hungary along with Germans during the first phase of German eastward settlement (German: Ostsiedlung) in the 12th century (and, later on, during the Modern Age). Transylvanian Saxons (in particular) and Banat Swabians (partly) are the descendants of these settlers. Furthermore, the Transylvanian Saxon dialect is very close to Luxembourgish. In addition, the Zipser Germans in the historical region of Zips, Slovakia (but also their descendants in Maramureș and Bukovina, two historical regions of Romania situated in the north of this country) are also part of the Luxembourgish diaspora given the fact that part of their ancestors stemmed from the northwestern Lower Rhineland and adjacent or neighbouring areas.

The explanation for the cultural, ethnic, and linguistic ties between the Saxons in Transylvania and the Luxembourgers is rather simple, namely that the first waves of Transylvanian Saxon settlers who colonised parts of Transylvania, present-day central Romania stemmed from the Rhine-Moselle river valley region and, implicitly, from Luxembourg as well. These settlers were part of the Ostsiedlung colonisation process in Central and Eastern Europe and were invited during the late 12th century, during the High Middle Ages, by the King of Hungary Géza II to develop, fortify, and defend southern and south-eastern Transylvania against invading Asian peoples (e.g. Cumans, Pechenegs, Mongols, or Tatars). Moreover, in 2007, Luxembourg City shared the status of European Capital of Culture with the Romanian town of Sibiu (German: Hermannstadt), one of the most important historical urban centres of the Transylvanian Saxons, both in the past and present, in cultural, administrative, and religious regards as well.

Civil ensign of Luxembourg

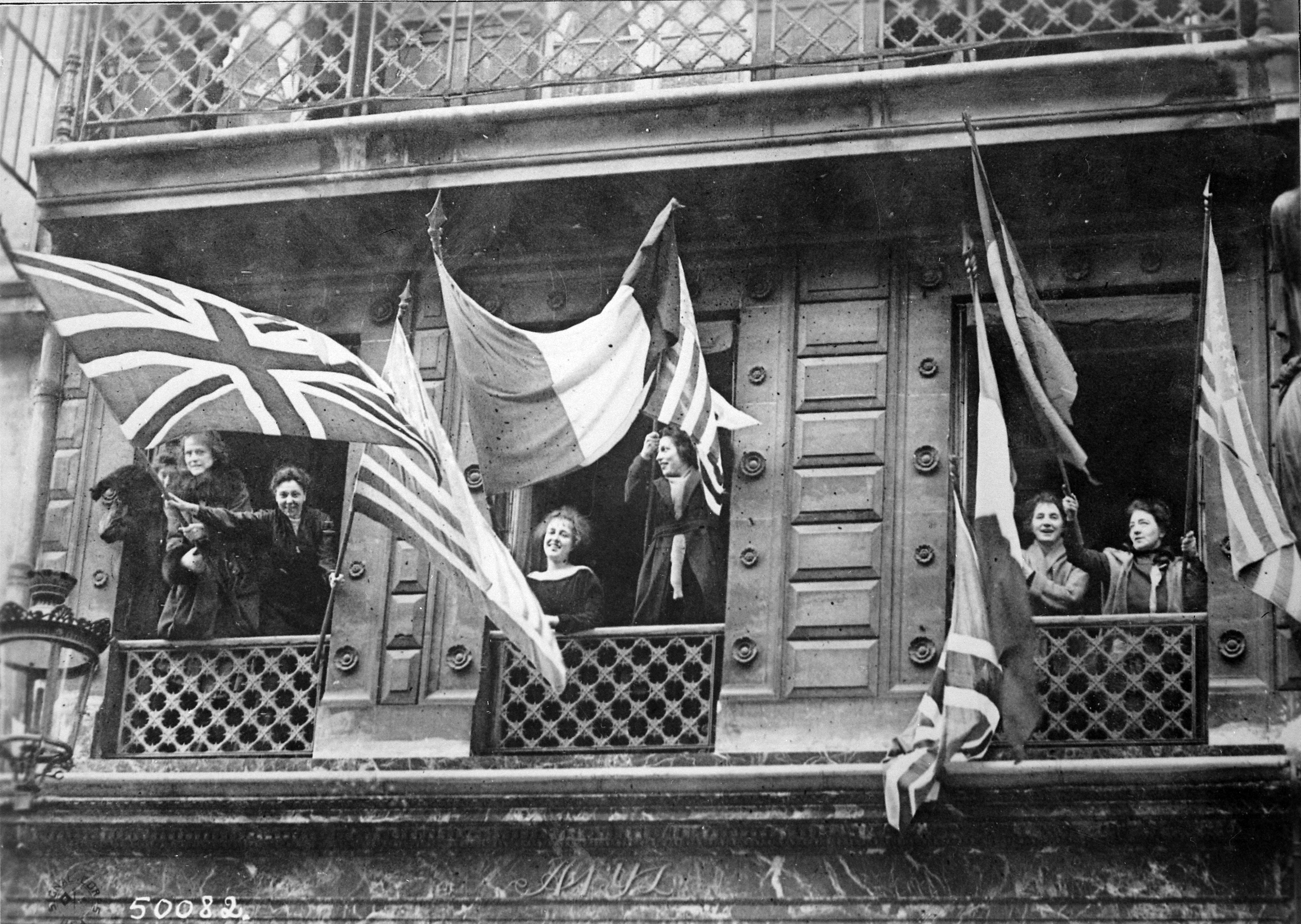
Luxembourgers celebrating the liberation of their country at the end of World War I in 1918.

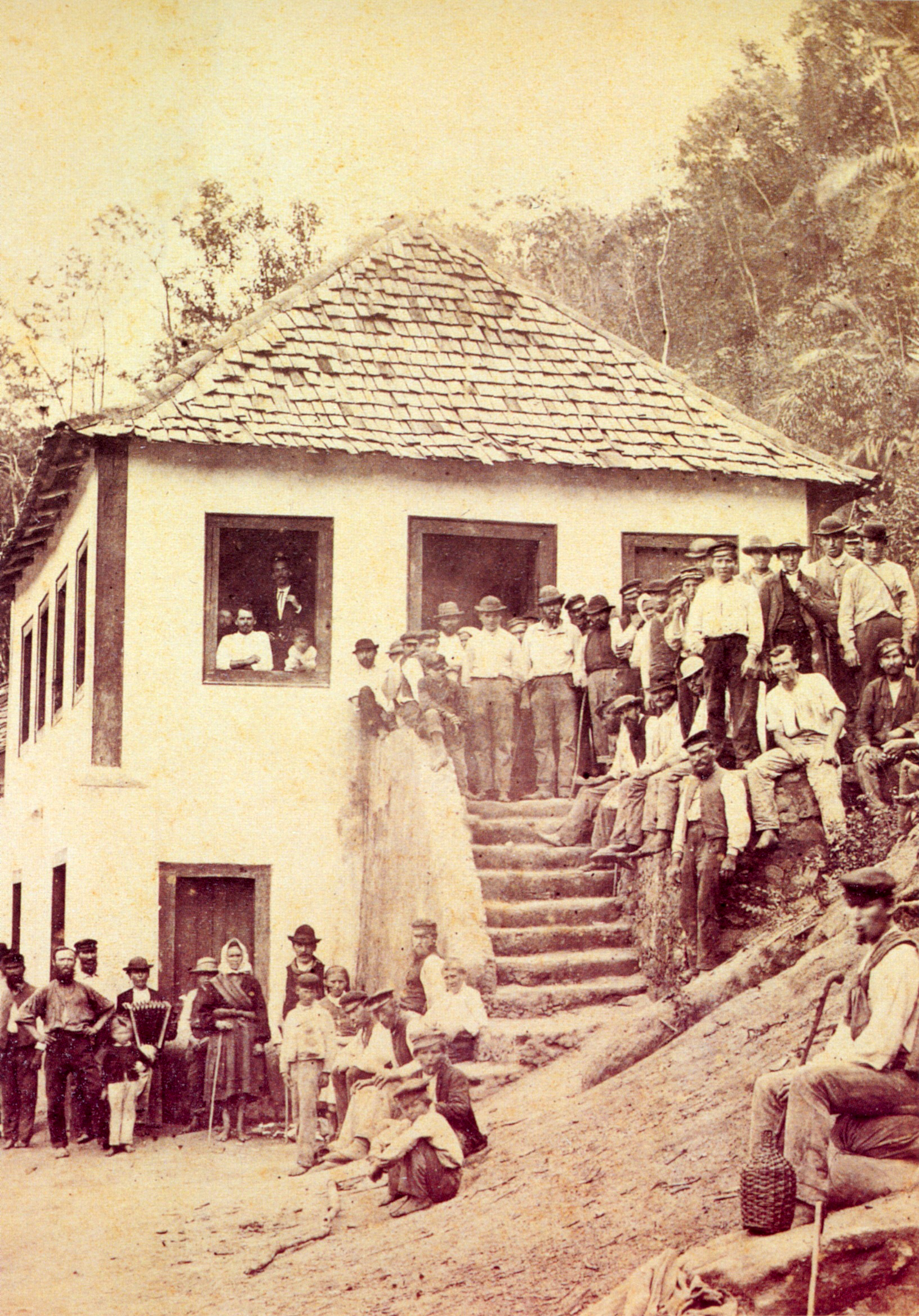
Germans and Luxembourgers in Brazil (1875)

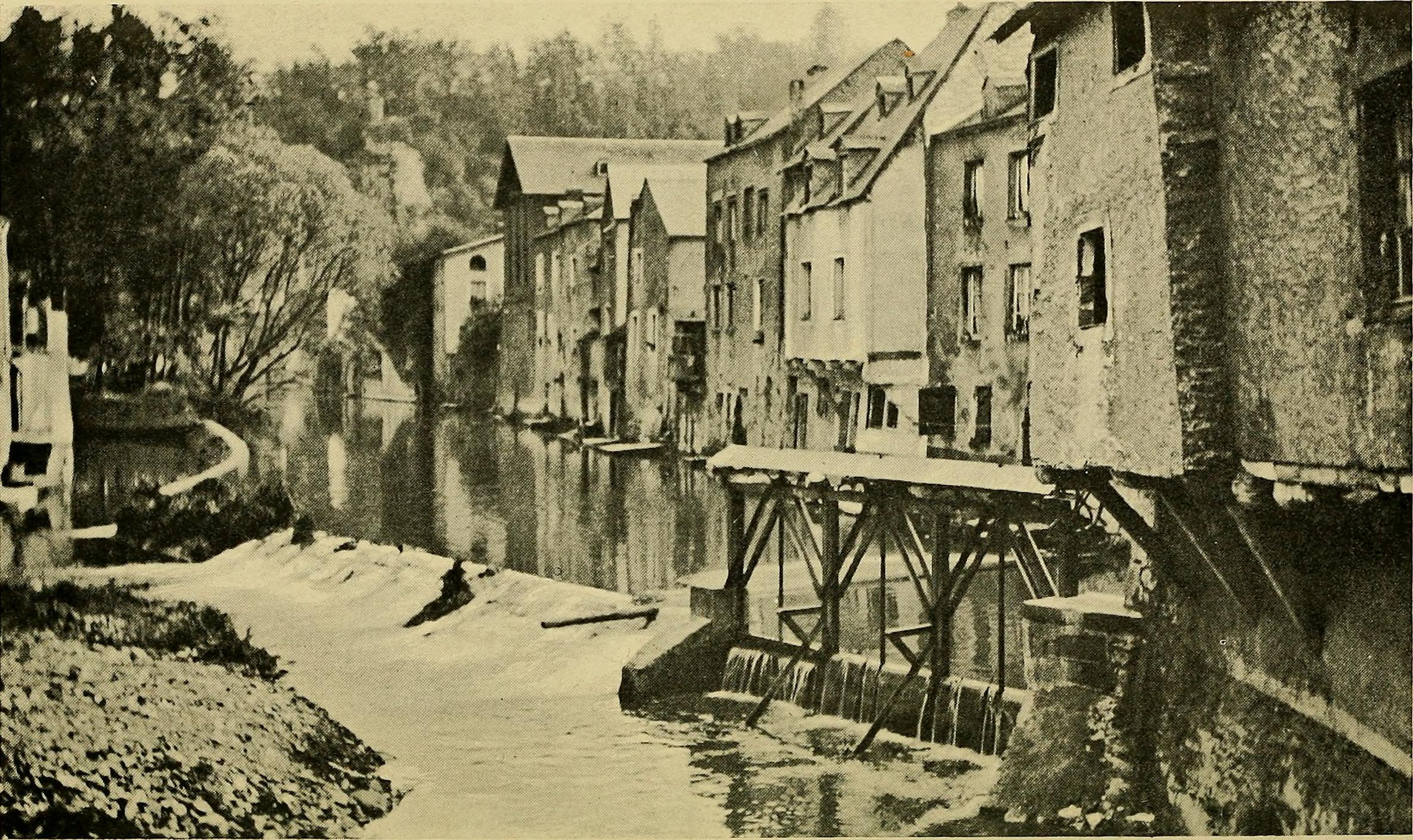
Luxembourg City in 1913

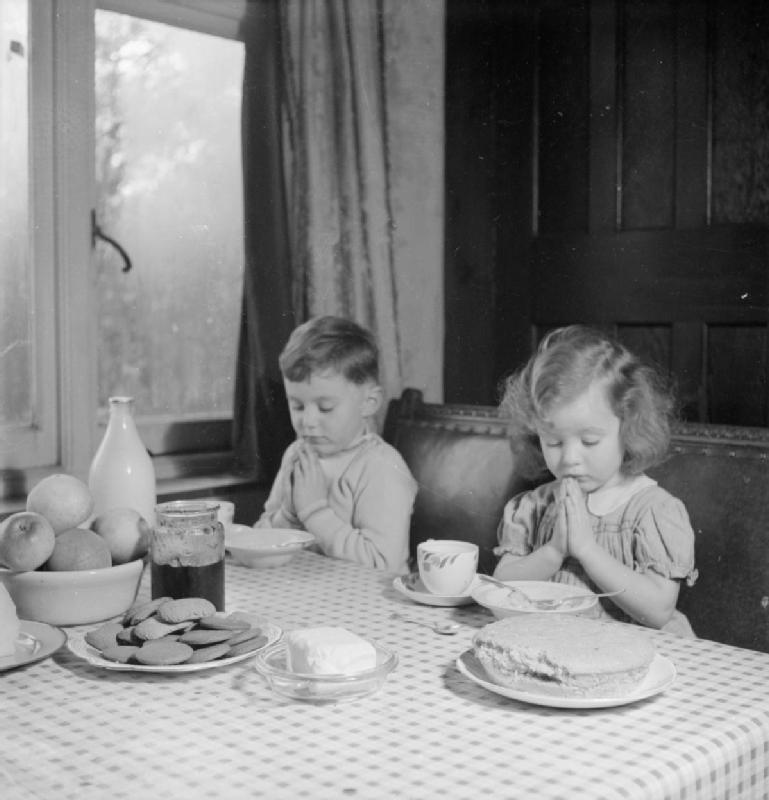
Luxembourgish children (evacuees) in Surrey, England (1942), saying grace before a meal

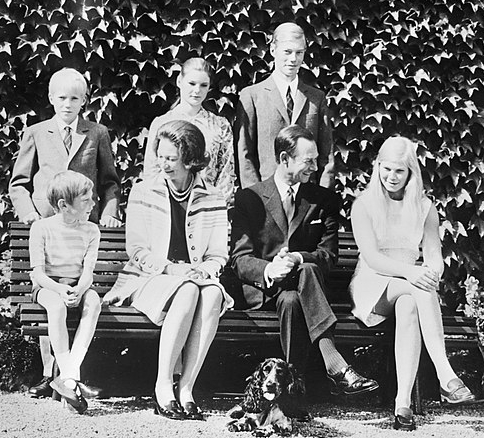
The Grand Ducal couple of Luxembourg alongside their children (1971)

== See also ==
- Luxembourgers in Chicago
- Luxembourgish Americans
- Luxembourgish Brazilians
- Luxembourgish Canadians
- Portuguese Luxembourgers
