= Puerto Rican Revolutionary Workers Organization =

American communist organization

- Abbreviation: PRRWO
- Founder: Gloria Fontanez
- Founded: 1972; 54 years ago
- Dissolved: 1976; 50 years ago
- Preceded by: Young Lords Party
- Membership: est. <100
- Ideology: Marxism–Leninism; Maoism; Anti-revisionism; Puerto Rican independence
- Political position: Far-left

The Puerto Rican Revolutionary Workers Organization (PRRWO) was a communist political organization that evolved from the Young Lords Party (YLP), a Puerto Rican civil rights organization, in 1972. Ideologically, the PRRWO adopted Marxist–Leninist and Maoist principles. It also took an anti-revisionist stance and advocated for Puerto Rican independence pending a communist revolution. Organizationally, the PRRWO was characterized by frequent purges, intragroup conflict, and violence against members. Scholars such as Johanna Fernández and Darrel Wanzer-Serrano, as well as former members of the PRRWO, have noted its authoritarian tendencies, elitism, and tendency to romanticize the working class.

The PRRWO aligned politically with various prominent communist organizations during the 1970s. At a conference hosted by the National Guardian, it announced the creation of a National Liaison Committee (NLC) consisting of members of the Revolutionary Union (RU), the Black Workers Congress (BWC), and I Wor Kuen (IWK), with the intention of forming a communist party. The PRRWO left the committee in 1974 amidst a conflict with the RU over its racial power dynamics. They then joined the National Continuations Committee (NCC), which was organized by the Communist League. (Note: Not to be confused with the international Communist League or the Communist League of America, this Communist League was founded by Nelson Peery as the California Communist League before changing its name in 1970.) In 1975, the PRRWO realigned itself once again, forming a "Revolutionary Wing" with the Revolutionary Workers League (RWL), (Note: Not to be confused with the Ohlerite Revolutionary Workers League, the Trotskyist Revolutionary Workers League, or any of the other organizations with the same name. This Revolutionary Workers League was founded in 1974 by activists associated with the Malcolm X Liberation University, the Youth Organization for Black Unity, and the Peoples College in Nashville, Tennessee.) the August 29th Movement, and an organization called Workers Viewpoint. This coalition also collapsed in 1975, and the PRRWO subsequently dissolved in 1976.

== Background ==
The Young Lords, originally a Puerto Rican street gang operating in Chicago, Illinois, shifted to become a civil rights organization during the 1960s. A New York chapter of the Young Lords was established on July 26, 1969. The New York chapter split from the Chicago Young Lords after a May 1970 retreat, renaming themselves the "Young Lords Party" (YLP). In 1971, in an effort spearheaded by health captain Gloria Fontanez, the YLP attempted to expand into Puerto Rico. Despite opposition within the organization and logistical challenges, 20 members of the YLP relocated to the island. However, the expansion faced criticism from established Puerto Rican nationalist groups and yielded minimal growth, ultimately leading the YLP to close several of its New York offices in June 1971.

In late 1971, YLP Central Committee member Pablo Guzmán visited China, and upon returning to the United States, he became friends with Donald Herbert Wright, a member of the Revolutionary Union (RU), a Maoist organization. Members of the YLP subsequently began a 40-day period of study in December, reading and discussing books by Karl Marx, Vladimir Lenin, and Joseph Stalin. One of the primary topics of discussion included the relationship between communist fronts, revolutionary communist parties, and the working class. As a result of the study, the YLP identified several problems it wanted to address within the organization, including a lack of integration into the daily lives of people, inadequate training in Marxist–Leninist and Maoist theory, and deficiencies in collective cohesion and democratic centralism.

== History ==
=== Founding and ideology ===
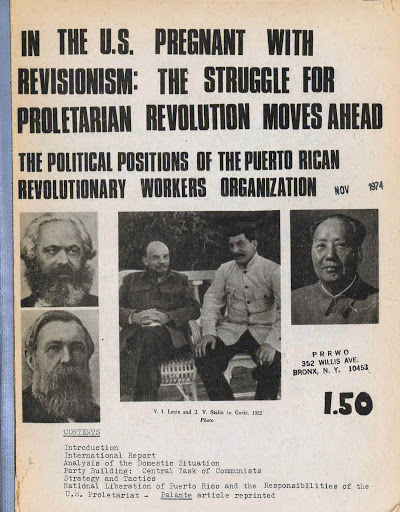
Cover of the book In The U.S. Pregnant With Revisionism: The Struggle for Proletarian Revolution Moves Ahead, written and published by the PRRWO, edited by Paul Saba

On July 3, 1972, the YLP held its first and last Party Congress. At the congress, Fontanez became the organization's sole leader, announced the end of the YLP's presence in Puerto Rico, and renamed the organization the Puerto Rican Revolutionary Workers Organization (PRRWO). Other resolutions adopted by the congress addressed the worldwide trend toward revolution and socialism and the importance of national liberation movements led by the working class, as well as denouncing revisionism in the Soviet Union. They also assessed the state of the Puerto Rican working class, concluding that it had sufficient strength to initiate a socialist revolution. 200 members of the YLP attended the congress. It was followed by a period of intragroup conflict regarding the nature of the newly-formed organization, with one side advocating for ideological communism and the other advocating for the integration of PRRWO cadres into factories. The ideological communist faction ultimately triumphed, and the organization ultimately coalesced around several primary principles:

1. Defense of democratic rights
A. Right to speak our language
B. Struggle for bi-lingual programs that really teach our history and culture
C. Right to mobilize freely and agitate for the national liberation struggle of Puerto Rico, i.e. the right to freedom of movement.

The PRRWO represented a significant shift from the YLP. While the YLP was a popular, community-focused radical group, the PRRWO was a more strictly ideological organization. As a result, the PRRWO closed its community offices and reduced public engagement, emphasizing the importance of study circles. This caused membership to decline to fewer than 100 members, per an estimate by researchers Aaron J. Leonard and Conor A. Gallagher. The atmosphere in the organization was one of distrust, and members were regularly accused of being agents of the Federal Bureau of Investigation (FBI). These members were then purged from the organization in what historian Johanna Fernández describes as "show trials".

=== National Liaison Committee ===
The PRRWO sought relationships with various other leftist organizations. In 1972, it merged with the Puerto Rican Student Union, which had previously been a wing of the YLP dedicated to organizing high school and college students. It also attended a conference organized by the National Guardian titled "What Road to Building a New Communist Party?" Several other organizations were present at the conference, including the RU; the Black Workers Congress (BWC), an organization founded in 1971 that combined elements of a Marxist–Leninist vanguard and a broader communist front; and I Wor Kuen (IWK), an Asian-American Maoist organization founded in 1969. At the conference, the PRRWO announced that it would be forming a National Liaison Committee (NLC), which would serve as the basis for a future communist party, consisting of representatives from the four organizations in attendance. According to PRRWO member Juan González, the members of the NLC were united in their acceptance of Maoist principles and in their goal of creating a new communist party.

The PRRWO continued the work of the YLP in New York City hospitals, where it had previously advocated for healthcare reform, occupied Lincoln Hospital to protest budget cuts and demand better services, and established a successful drug detoxification program from the hospital's nurse's residence. It also attempted to organize workers at Eagle Electric in Queens, as well as the companies Leviton and Chrome in Brooklyn. Some members were sent to organize in Chicago and Detroit, Michigan. The PRRWO worked closely with the RU, with members of the organization attending meetings of the RU's Revolutionary Communist Youth Brigade. In May 1973, it attended another conference hosted by the National Guardian, this one concerning "Women and Class Struggle". Later, in October, it led a demonstration in Washington, D.C. to demand the freedom of Puerto Rican political prisoners.

While the RU and the other members of the NLC initially agreed that Black workers and workers of color should be given organizational priority, conflict broke out between the organizations in 1973. The PRRWO, BWC, and IWK all argued that the predominantly white RU was trying to dominate the party. In response, the RU accused the other three groups of "narrow nationalism" and "Bundism". Citing fundamental disagreements about the nature of party building and a general breakdown in communication, the PRRWO left the NLC and broke ties with the RU in 1974. Wright, the RU's representative to the NLC and Fontanez's husband, subsequently left the RU and joined the PRRWO. A few members of the PRRWO also broke off to join the RU. The PRRWO then joined the National Continuations Committee (NCC), a coalition organized by the Communist League.

=== Continued decline ===
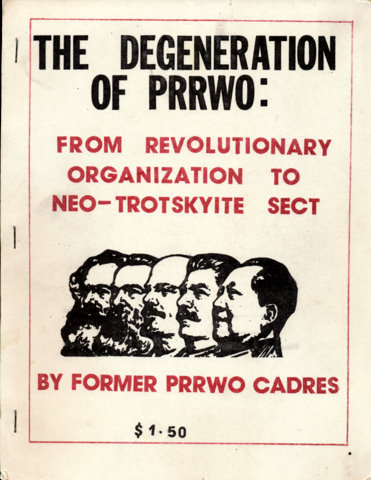
Cover of the pamphlet The Degeneration of PRRWO: From Revolutionary Organization to Neo-Trotskyite Sect, written by ex-PRRWO cadres, edited by Paul Saba

Fontanez has described the period after the split between the PRRWO and the NLC as a "time of darkness". According to her, the PRRWO began adopting methods used by Mao Zedong during the Cultural Revolution, including torture. Fontanez claims that this activity was primarily carried out by members of the organization's security wing, who later blamed her. However, Fernández contests this, claiming that several instances of violence were directly ordered by her. These included the beating of Richie Perez, as well as an incident when PRRWO member Olguie Robles was taken hostage. Many members of the organization resigned in 1974, including Juan González, Pablo Guzmán, Iris Morales, and David Perez. The departure of these members engendered a feeling of deep betrayal in those who remained. Fontanez also became addicted to alcohol, and her relationship with Wright became abusive. In one instance, after he had beaten her, she appeared at the house of a fellow PRRWO member bloodied and with her daughter in tow. Eventually, Fontanez discovered that Wright was an FBI agent, prompting her to leave him.

In 1975, the PRRWO participated in rallies celebrating International Women's Day, International Workers' Day, and the anniversary of the Grito de Lares (transl. 'Cry of Lares'). (Note: The Grito de Lares is often considered to be Puerto Rico's Independence Day.) However, PRRWO membership had declined even further by late 1975, when it aligned itself with the Revolutionary Workers League (RWL), the August 29th Movement, and an organization called Workers Viewpoint to form a "Revolutionary Wing". This "wing" advocated for ideological purification programs and accused other leftist organizations of revisionism. It lasted for several months before collapsing due to infighting. The PRRWO and the RWL remained aligned for slightly longer before also breaking apart. The PRRWO subsequently dissolved in 1976. According to academic Darrel Wanzer-Serrano, only a "handful of members" remained by the time of its dissolution.

== Legacy and historiography ==
Scholars have interpreted the history of the PRRWO in various ways. Fernández argues that the PRRWO lacked a clear strategy for influencing workers, whom they "romanticized" rather than "assess[ing]... as a class with potential, objective power under certain optimal conditions". She also criticizes the PRRWO's "ivory tower" approach, claiming that its members believed they were in an "enlightened position" and "[knew] what was best for everyone". She concludes that the evolution of the YLP into the PRRWO caused the culture of the organization to become "irreparably damaged", which caused many of its members to leave.

Meanwhile, academic Darrel Wanzer-Serrano notes the shift in iconography between the YLP and the PRRWO. While the YLP idolized popular radical figures such as Che Guevara, Pedro Albizu Campos, and Malcolm X, the PRRWO took its primary inspiration from more "strict ideological" figures such as Marx, Lenin, Mao, Stalin, and Friedrich Engels. Wanzer-Serrano interprets this shift as representative of the organization's general decline in public support, positing that by 1975, it had "left behind its concerns for democracy" and "devolved into a protoauthoritarian regime".

In an interview reflecting on his time in the organization, Richie Perez claims that they "[did] a lot of studying" and "took that stuff right off the page", leading them to "glorif[y]" the American working class" and disregard the racism prevalent within it. He also criticizes the organization's relationships with the RU and the BWC, as well as its "elitist" approach to organizing. He concludes that "we allowed our world to become so narrow that the only people who had validity were the people in the organization".

== See also ==
- List of anti-revisionist groups

== Sources ==
- Beliz, Crisol G. (2015). "'They Do Not Treat Us Like Human Beings': Latino-Police Relations in 1960's Chicago". McNair Scholars Journal. 19 (1): 6–16.
- Elbaum, Max (2006). Revolution in the Air: Sixties Radicals turn to Lenin, Mao and Che. London; New York: Verso. ISBN 978-1-84467-563-0.
- Fernández, Johanna (2020). The Young Lords: A Radical History. Chapel Hill: University of North Carolina Press. ISBN 978-1-4696-5345-7.
- Leonard, Aaron J.; Gallagher, Conor A. (2014). Heavy Radicals: The FBI's Secret War on America's Maoists - The Revolutionary Union/Revolutionary Communist Party 1968-1980. Croydon: Zero Books. ISBN 978-1-78279-534-6.
- Márquez, Roberto (1995). "Sojourners, Settlers, Castaways and Creators: A Recollection of Puerto Rico Past and Puerto Ricans Present". The Massachusetts Review. 36 (1): 94–118. ISSN 0025-4878. JSTOR 25090581.
- Perez, Richie (2009). "¡Palante, Siempre Palante!, Interview with Richie Perez" (PDF). Centro Journal (Interview). Interviewed by Morales, Iris.
- Saba, Paul, ed. (1974). "History of the Development of the Puerto Rican Revolutionary Workers Organization". In the U.S. Pregnant with Revisionism: The Struggle for Proletarian Revolution Moves Ahead. New York: PRRWO. OCLC 58400325 – via Marxists Internet Archive.
- United States Senate Committee on the Judiciary (1976). The Puerto Rican Revolutionary Workers Organization: A Staff Study (Report). Washington, D.C.: U.S. Government Printing Office – via Google Books.
- Wanzer-Serrano, Darrel (2015). The New York Young Lords and the Struggle for Liberation. Philadelphia: Temple University Press. ISBN 978-1-4399-1204-1.
