= Women of the Young Lords =

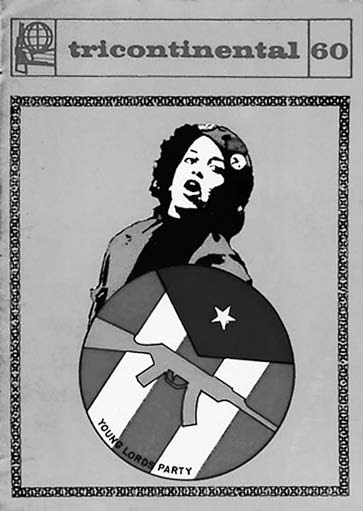
Tricontinental magazine cover depicting a female member of the Young Lords Party (YLP)

The women of the Young Lords, originally integrated into the organization from a women's auxiliary group in Chicago, Illinois, made significant contributions to the organization. Despite their substantial involvement in its activities, they initially faced marginalization. Often assigned menial tasks, they were unable to pursue leadership positions. As a result, they published a position paper on women in the organization's newspaper discussing the expectations placed of women of color. In early 1970, the women of the Young Lords organized an informal "women's caucus" to discuss their grievances with the organization's gender dynamics.

Despite opposition from some male members of the organization, a group of women issued an ultimatum to its Central Committee in May 1970. As a result of this ultimatum, the Young Lords modified their Thirteen-Point Program, created a men's caucus focused on domestic skills and emotional vulnerability, and promoted of Denise Oliver-Velez to the organization's Central Committee. Following the resignation of José "Cha Cha" Jiménez, the leader of the Chicago Young Lords, Angie Navedo became the chapter's leader. Meanwhile, Gloria Fontanez joined the Central Committee in 1970, spearheading the Young Lords Party's (YLP's) (Note: The New York Young Lords became the Young Lords Party (YLP) in May 1970 after splitting from the Chicago organization.) expansion into Puerto Rico in early 1971 and eventually becoming its sole leader as well.

Scholarly discussions highlight how the women of the Young Lords resisted various forms of oppression within the organization, pushing for structural changes and embodying an early form of intersectional feminism. Some, such as Frances Negrón-Muntaner, have also analyzed the women's style, concluding that they adopted masculine and militaristic attire such as combat boots to challenge gender norms and advocate for equality. Others, such as historians Johanna Fernández and Jennifer Nelson, discuss the Young Lords' positions on reproductive rights, which, it is argued, influenced later organizations and positioned the Young Lords as early advocates for reproductive freedom.

== Early women's involvement ==
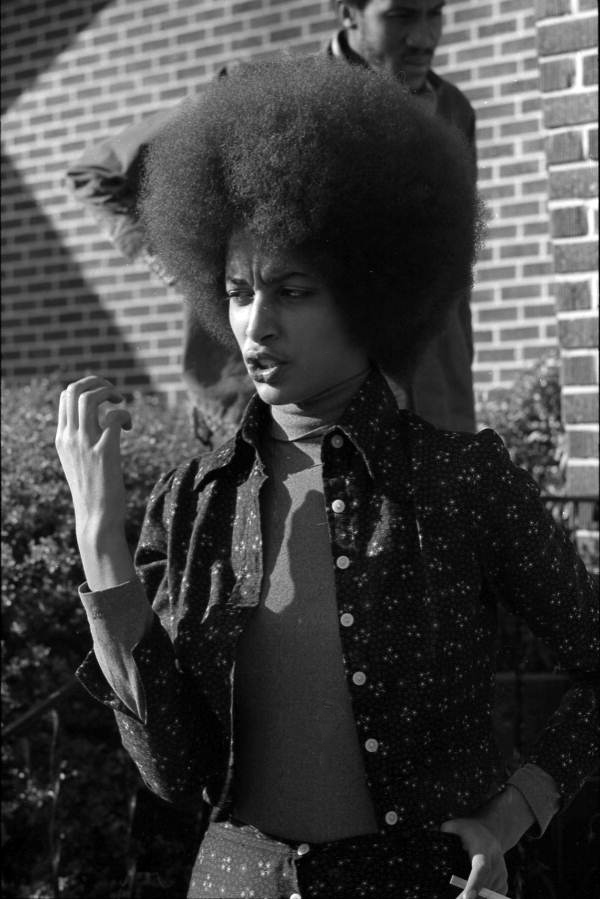
Denise Oliver-Velez, an early member of the New York Young Lords

The Young Lords, originally a Puerto Rican street gang operating in Chicago, Illinois, shifted to become a civil rights organization during the 1960s. Women were first integrated into the Chicago Young Lords with the incorporation of "the Lordettes", previously a women's auxiliary group. According to historian Johanna Fernández, because many of these women had family ties with members of the Young Lords street gang, their inclusion made the demand for childcare centers crucial. Fernández also notes that many contemporary women's groups were making similar demands for childcare centers at the time. In July 1969, the Chicago Young Lords occupied the Armitage Avenue Methodist Church, demanding the establishment of a daycare center. The daycare center was ultimately allowed to open on site at the church, with the Young Lords' minister of health launching several public health campaigns there in collaboration with his wife.

That same month, on July 26, 1969, a New York chapter of the Young Lords was formed. Sonia Ivany identifies herself as the only woman to attend the organization's first meeting. Denise Oliver-Velez was another early female member the New York Young Lords, terminating her studies at the State University of New York at Old Westbury to become a full-time member. In 1969, she was appointed as the "officer of the day" (OD), allowing her to work closely with the organization's Central Committee. As OD, Oliver-Velez was tasked with overseeing the day-to-day operations of the organization. Several women, including Ivany, Oliver-Velez, Elena González, and Erika Seznov, were among the Young Lords arrested in the leadup to the Church Offensive. The offensive led to a substantial increase in female membership, with women comprising 35–40% of members by January 1970.

== Development of the women's caucus ==
=== Position Paper on Women ===
Puerto Rican, Black, and other Third World (colonized) women are becoming more aware of their oppression in the past and today. They are suffering three different types of oppression under capitalism. First, they are oppressed as Puerto Ricans or Blacks. Second, they are oppressed as women. Third, they are oppressed by their own men. The Third World woman becomes the most oppressed person in the world today.

— Young Lords Party Position Paper on Women, originally published in Palante in September 1970, republished in The Young Lords: A Reader, ed. Darrel Enck-Wanzer

Despite the involvement of women in the Young Lords, gender-related issues were not initially a priority for the organization, and women were often poorly treated. In many cases, women were expected to perform menial labor, and they were unable to pursue leadership roles. Influenced by their interactions with mothers in east Harlem during the Young Lords' lead screening campaign, the women of the New York Young Lords began developing a position paper on women during the early-to-mid 1970s.

The paper, which was ultimately published in Palante in September 1970, links the oppression of women to the institutions of marriage and the nuclear family. Specifically, it highlights the unique difficulties faced by poor women of color, whom the paper's writers argue are often exploited as "cheap labor and sexual objects". It also discusses the standards placed on Puerto Rican women's sexuality, positing that Puerto Rican women are never expected to experience sexual pleasure. It argues that the accumulated anger and violence of Puerto Rican men, stemming from their oppression, is misdirected towards Puerto Rican women. Various topics related to reproductive rights are also discussed. For example, the paper argues for legalized abortion so long as those abortions are "community controlled". It also criticizes the forced sterilization of Puerto Rican women, characterizing it as a form of "genocide". Sterilization was a significant concern for the Young Lords in the 1970s. Young Lords member Iris Morales highlighted the high sterilization rates in New York City in a 1970 article, arguing that women often underwent sterilization under restrictive circumstances.

=== Sunday meetings and ultimatum ===
Beginning in January 1970, the women of the Young Lords began holding Sunday meetings where they discussed their frustrations, both with the organization's practices—such as the gendered division of labor and men's use of political power to engage in sexual activities with women—and with society as a whole. These informal meetings, modeled after similar practices among white second-wave feminists, were characterized by participants as a "women's caucus". Members of the Central Committee dismissed these meetings as "hen talk". The caucus continued to meet throughout early 1970, and in May 1970, they organized an all-women panel entitled "Women of the Colonies", where they stated their opposition to creating segregated men's and women's organizations, as was commonly suggested by some second-wave feminists. At the same time, they also met with opposition from some male members, who viewed the "women's issue" as divisive.

In point 10 their original "Thirteen-Point Program", published in the newspaper Palante in May 1970, the New York Young Lords advocated for "equality for women", claiming that "machismo must be revolutionary... not oppressive". According to historian Erik Morales, the idea of machismo became widespread during the 20th century following the racialization of Latinos during the late 19th century. Fernández, meanwhile, characterizes machismo and "hypermasculinity" as common "coping mechanism[s]" for young men of color in a racist society. As the women's caucus continued to meet, opposition to this point grew, with Oliver-Velez in particular viewing the idea of "revolutionary machismo" as a contradictory phrase, akin to "revolutionary fascism" or "revolutionary racism".

In May 1970, a group of women in the organization issued an ultimatum to the Central Committee, demanding the creation of men's, women's, and gay caucuses; formal opposition to sexist behavior; the revision of the Thirteen-Point Program; and greater women's representation in leadership roles. As a result, the 10th point of the Thirteen-Point program was modified to say "Down with Machismo and Male Chauvinism", becoming the fifth point of the revised program. The men's caucus was also created with the aim of teaching male members domestic skills such as cooking and childcare, as well as encouraging emotional vulnerability. Oliver-Velez was elevated to the Central Committee, becoming its finance minister.

== Women in leadership ==
In 1969, José "Cha Cha" Jiménez, resigned from his position as leader of the Chicago Young Lords. As a result, Angie Navedo became the leader of the organization. According to a graduate thesis written by Michael Robert Gonzales, Navedo had previously helped to established "Mothers and Others", a women's caucus within the Chicago Young Lords. In September 1970, the YLP's health captain, Gloria Fontanez, supported the demotion of the chairman of the Young Lords Party (YLP), Felipe Luciano. After the demotion, she eventually took Luciano's place on the Central Committee.

Prior to Luciano's demotion, Fontanez, in her role as health captain, had advocated for the expansion of the YLP into Puerto Rico. Despite opposition from Oliver-Velez and others, in January 1971, she flew to Puerto Rico with YLP to prepare for this expansion, which began in March. Oliver-Velez's disagreement with the expansion ultimately led her to leave the organization later that month. The initiative faced numerous logistical issues, including financial constraints and members' lack of fluency in Spanish. A contingent of the YLP spearheaded by Juan Ramos and Juan "Fi" Ortiz criticized the organization's work on the island. Fontanez interpreted these criticisms as a direct challenge, and Ramos and Ortiz were both expelled from the organization in June 1972. Subsequently, at a congress held in July, Fontanez became the sole leader of the Central Committee, announced the end of the YLP's presence in Puerto Rico, and renamed the organization the Puerto Rican Revolutionary Workers Organization (PRRWO). Fernández characterizes Fontanez's tenure as leader of the PRWWO as a chaotic time marked by intragroup conflict and "cult-like behavior".

== Legacy and historiography ==
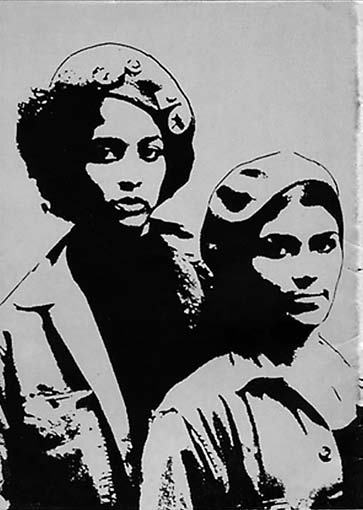
Tricontinental magazine back cover

In July 2023, an exhibit entitled Encendidas: Women of the Young Lords was shown at The Honeycomb Network, a community space in Humboldt Park, Chicago. The exhibit, partially curated by DePaul University professor Jacqueline Lazú, discussed the impact of women on the organization. According to Lazú, her participation in the exhibition was prompted by her discovery that women were involved in the Young Lords from its inception in 1965 and throughout its various iterations.

Scholars have discussed the women of the Young Lords in a variety of ways. Academic Darrel Wanzer-Serrano contends that the women of the Young Lords' opposition to classism, racism, sexism, and the culture of machismo constitute "embodied acts of resistance within the confines of the organizational structures", driving change. Fernández similarly argues that the women of the Young Lords "forced changes in the structure, rules, and global vision statement of their gender-integrated organization", acting as early practitioners of intersectional feminism. Meanwhile, academic Kristie Soares highlights the importance of both joy and rage in their activism, arguing that their focus on these emotions allowed them to challenge gendered stereotypes stemming from colonialism. She specifically points to the "joy and laughter shared in community" and the "rage the women felt toward the inclusion of machismo as a revolutionary doctrine" as key components of their activism.

Frances Negrón-Muntaner, meanwhile, analyzes the style and dress of the YLP in her article The Look of Sovereignty: Style and Politics in the Young Lords. She argues that the women of the Young Lords challenged gender norms by wearing clothing traditionally associated with men and militarism—including combat boots—to advocate for equality "in and out of the organization". She further clarifies that the women of the Young Lords understood that adopting militant dress was not enough to gain genuine acknowledgment as equals amidst the group's growing paramilitary focus. As such, Negrón-Muntaner argues, they later focused on concrete actions, such as the formation of the women's caucus.

Fernández also argues that the Young Lords "articulated a comprehensive reproductive rights program" addressing diverse issues such as abortion, childcare, contraception, and sterilization—establishing "potent connections not only to broader issues of race, gender, and class but between those issues and the democratic control of local institutions". Historian Jennifer Nelson suggests that the Young Lords' positions on reproductive rights influenced later organizations such as the Committee for Abortion Rights and against Sterilization Abuse, which, she claims, adopted many of the YLP's policies on reproductive freedom. Nelson credits the YLP as one of the first organizations to advocate for an end to sterilization abuse and for unrestricted access to abortion and contraception.

== Notable women of the Young Lords ==
- Angie Navedo – Leader of the Chicago Young Lords
- Denise Oliver-Velez – Young Lords officer of the day, minister of finance, and minister of economic development
- Gloria Fontanez – YLP health captain, Central Committee member, and leader
- Iris Morales – Young Lords member and documentarian
- Sonia Ivany – First female member of the Young Lords
- Sylvia Rivera – Young Lords affiliate (Note: According to Lilia Fernández, Rivera was a member of the YLP. However, Johanna Fernández claims Rivera was a "friendly traveler" to the Young Lords, seeking their assistance as bodyguards for a period as a result of death threats she received after reporting a guard's assault on an inmate in The Tombs.) and co-founder of Street Transvestite Action Revolutionaries (STAR)

== Sources ==
- Beliz, Crisol G. (2015). "'They Do Not Treat Us Like Human Beings': Latino-Police Relations in 1960's Chicago". McNair Scholars Journal. 19 (1): 6–16.
- Enck-Wanzer, Darrel, ed. (2010). The Young Lords: A Reader. New York; London: New York University Press. ISBN 978-0-8147-2293-0.
- Fernández, Johanna (2009). "Denise Oliver and the Young Lords: Party Stretching the Political Boundaries of Struggle". In Gore, Dayo F.; Theoharis, Jeanne; Woodard, Komozi (eds.). Want to Start a Revolution?: Radical Women in the Black Freedom Struggle. New York University Press. pp. 271–193. ISBN 978-0-8147-8314-6.
- Fernández, Johanna (2020). The Young Lords: A Radical History. Chapel Hill: University of North Carolina Press. ISBN 978-1-4696-5345-7.
- Fernández, Lilia (2018). "Founding of the Young Lords, 1968-1972". In Fernández, Lilia (ed.). 50 Events That Shaped Latino History: An Encyclopedia of the American Mosaic. Vol. 2. Santa Barbara: ABC-CLIO. pp. 625–641. ISBN 978-1-4408-3763-0.
- Gonzales, Michael Robert (2015). Ruffians and Revolutionaries: the Development of the Young Lords Organization in Chicago (Master's thesis). Milwaukee: University of Wisconsin–Milwaukee.
- Jeffries, Judson (2003). "From Gang-Bangers to Urban Revolutionaries: The Young Lords of Chicago". Journal of the Illinois State Historical Society. 95 (3): 288–304. ISSN 2328-3335. JSTOR 40193998.
- Morales, Erik (2015). Machismo(s): A Cultural History, 1928 – 1984 (PDF) (Doctoral thesis). Ann Arbor: University of Michigan.
- Morales, Iris (dir.) (1996). Palante, Siempre Palante! (documentary). New York: Third World Newsreel.
- Morris, Jessica; Keller, Monica (2021). "Rivera, Sylvia". In Goldberg, Abbie E.; Beemyn, Genny (eds.). The SAGE Encyclopedia of Trans Studies. Vol. 2. Amherst: SAGE. pp. 742–744. ISBN 978-1-5443-9381-0.
- Negrón-Muntaner, Frances (2015). "The Look of Sovereignty: Style and Politics in the Young Lords". Centro Journal. 27 (1): 4–33. ISSN 2163-2960. ProQuest 1704739824.
- Nelson, Jennifer (2001). ""Abortions under Community Control": Feminism, Nationalism, and the Politics of Reproduction among New York City's Young Lords". Journal of Women's History. 13 (1): 157–180. doi:10.1353/jowh.2001.0031. ISSN 1527-2036.
- Ogbar, Jeffrey O. G. Ogbar (2006). "Puerto Rico en mi corazon: The young lords, Black Power and Puerto Rican nationalism in the US, 1966-1972". Centro Journal. 18 (1): 148–169. ISSN 2163-2960.
- Rivera, Marisol V.; Jeffries, Judson (2019). "From Radicalism to Representation: Jose 'Cha Cha' Jimenez's Journey into Electoral Politics". Journal of African American Studies. 23 (4): 299–319. doi:10.1007/s12111-019-09446-6. ISSN 1936-4741.
- Soares, Kristie (2021). "Joy, Rage, and Activism: The Gendered Politics of Affect in the Young Lords Party". Signs. 46 (4): 939–962. doi:10.1086/713295. ISSN 1545-6943.
- Wanzer-Serrano, Darrel (2015). The New York Young Lords and the Struggle for Liberation. Philadelphia: Temple University Press. ISBN 978-1-4399-1204-1.
