= 1970 Lincoln Hospital takeover =

Healthcare protest in New York City

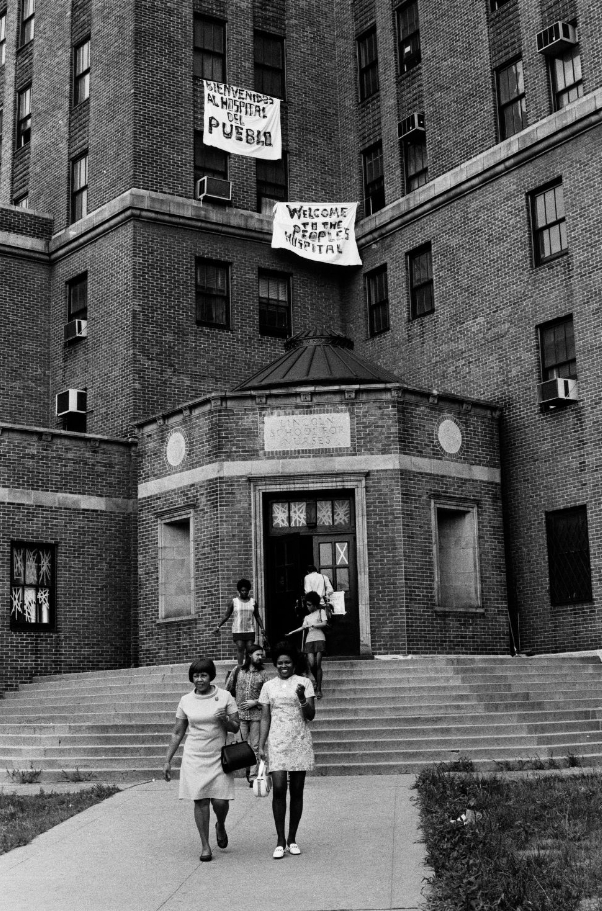
Banners flown at Lincoln Hospital during Young Lords takeover read "Welcome to the People's Hospital"/"Bienvenidos al hospital del pueblo", July 14, 1970.

In 1970, the Young Lords staged an occupation of the Lincoln Hospital in the South Bronx, New York City. This occupation took place as a protest to demand for better health care and practices by the Lincoln Hospital administrative staff. The takeover resulted in hundreds of news reports that highlighted and publicized the inadequacies of the Lincoln Hospital. In the years that followed, laws were changed that provided the residents of the South Bronx (at the time, primarily African-American and Puerto Rican residents) with improved healthcare. However, discrepancies in funding for hospitals in lower-income areas, such as the Lincoln Hospital in the South Bronx, remain so.

== History of the Lincoln Hospital ==
Research conducted on the Lincoln Hospital has proven that there are increased odds of deaths for African American and Hispanic patients after diagnosis of colorectal cancer. An article from the New York Times quotes a nurse who claimed the Lincoln hospital was like "a butcher shop that kills patients and frustrates workers from serving these patients". Many hospital staff and members of the Young Lords Party believed the hospital was in dire need of financial and community support. The hospital was neglected by both the city and the state for many years, which was the due direct cause of such hospital conditions during the late 1960s and early 1970s.

== The Young Lords ==
The Young Lords, a group of Puerto Rican activists, began to develop in Chicago, Illinois. As chapter size in Chicago increased and prominence grew, Puerto Ricans in New York wanted to expand to their own communities of East Harlem, Brooklyn, the Bronx, etc. The New York chapter of the Young Lords was established in 1969, one year before the Takeover of the Lincoln Hospital in the South Bronx took place. In a statement describing Young Lords Party in New York, the branch identified that its basis concerned itself primarily with "immediate needs of the people". This broad ideology extended itself to improvements in healthcare, housing, institutionalized disparities, and more. During the 1960s and 1970s, the Young Lords facilitated the help of opening up testing centers for Tuberculosis for people of color in lower-income neighborhoods such as the South Bronx. These clinics were opened in response to the lack of available testing clinics for African Americans and Puerto Ricans at public hospitals and private practices. The Young Lords claimed "community control is the heart of the work".

With reference to the Lincoln Hospital in the South Bronx, there have been multiple accounts of inadequate conditions and improper practice by the hospital staff. These accounts include doctors and nurses leaving surgical instruments inside patients after surgical procedures. In addition, research proves that the infant mortality rate in the Lincoln Hospital (between 1960 and 1970) was three times the national average. One impactful death that was deemed "preventable" by the Young Lords Party was the death of Carmen Rodriguez. Her death led to the establishment of the Patient Bill of Rights. The Young Lords Party drafted this document and demanded that all patients, no matter the race, social, or economic status, would be treated with dignity and respect when they received hospital care.

In response to these conditions, the Young Lords Party in New York confronted the Lincoln Hospital staff on many accounts. However, their demands were not met. As a result, the Young Lords Party in New York decided to organize and participate in a hospital overtake.

== Hospital takeover ==
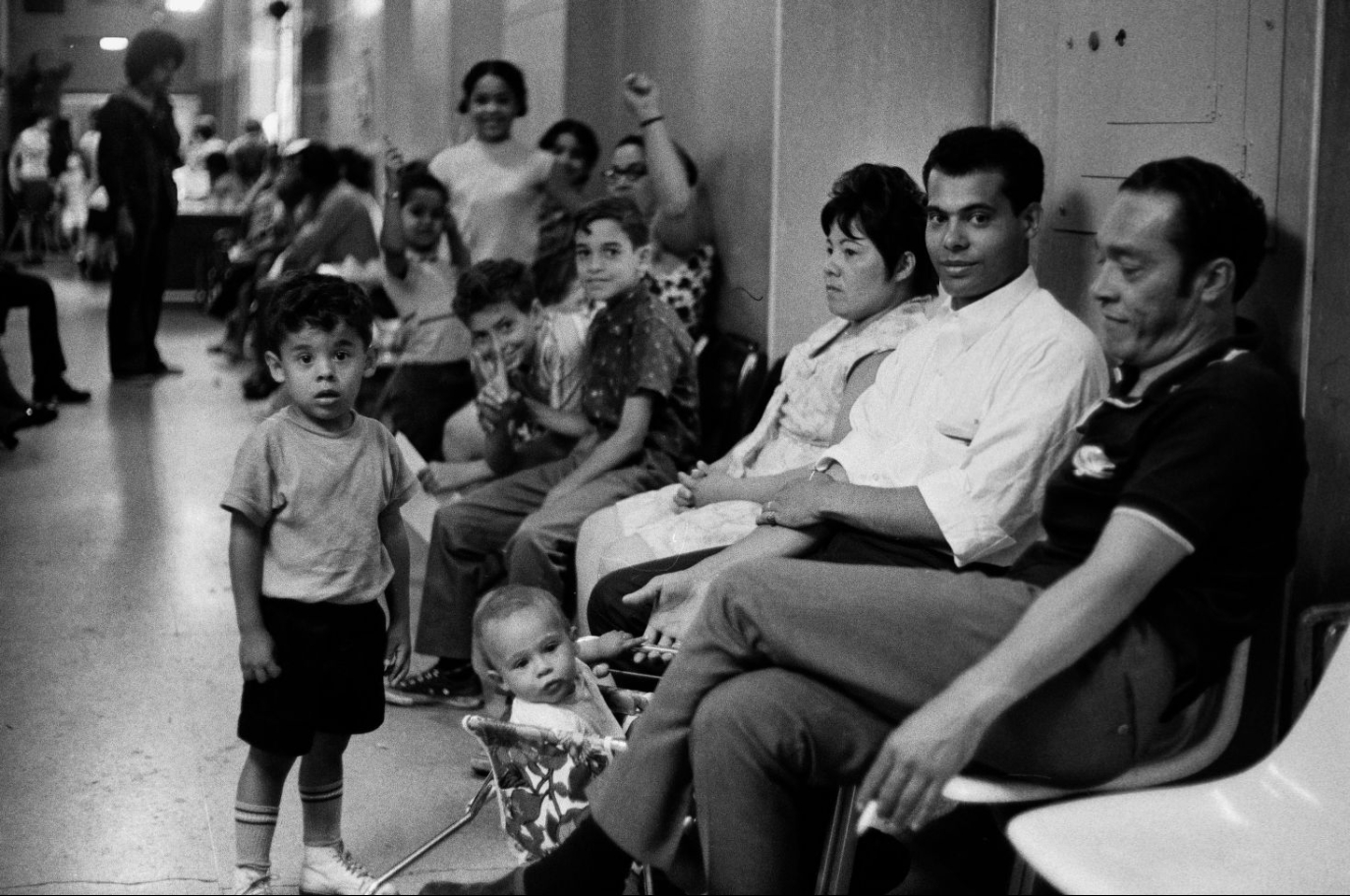
South Bronx residents waiting for medical treatment at Lincoln Hospital during Young Lords takeover, July 14, 1970

At 5:15 AM, on July 14, 1970, a group of 150 people (mostly members or affiliates of the Puerto Rican group, the Young Lords Party) entered the Lincoln Hospital in the South Bronx, New York. Key players in the takeover of the Lincoln Hospital included, but were not limited to: Iris Morales, Felipe Luciano, Juan Gonzalez, Miguel "Mickey" Melendez, and Pablo "Yoruba" Guzman. Pablo Guzman and Louis Alvarez Perez, were the only two arrested after police ended the 12-hour takeover. However, their charges were dropped that night.

The Young Lords' occupation of the hospital building led to a lack of hospital staff attendance that day (see Controversy below). During the day, leaders of the Young Lords Party, alongside the Think Lincoln Committee and members of the Health Revolutionary Unity Movement, met with hospital administrator Dr. Antero Lecot, assistant to Mayor Lindsay Sidney Davidoff, and members of the new Health and Hospitals Corporation to discuss hospital action that would meet the conditions and requirements demanded by the Young Lords Party. According the New York Times written by Alfonso A. Narvaez (1970), the Young Lords claimed that their demands included the following: "no cutback in services or jobs, the quick completion of the new Lincoln Hospital, door-to-door preventative care emphasizing tests for lead poisoning, anemia and tuberculosis and drug addiction and a day-care center for patients who have to bring their children to the hospital". These listed demands by the Young Lords paralleled their values as an organization—values that emphasized community care and involvement, in addition to basic health care services that were designed specifically for the needs of the Bronx community.

At around 4:30 PM, hospital staff and the leaders of the Young Lords reached an agreement. The agreement included an end to the hospital takeover, but the Young Lords were given permission to run certain community programs within the hospital, with the aid of hospital staff and administration. The entire hospital takeover lasted 12 hours and ended with the removal of the Puerto Rican flag from the exterior of the Lincoln Hospital building. Other accounts offer the idea that the Young Lords were forced out of the hospital by the police department. To escape punishment, many of the members of the Young Lords exited the hospital wearing medical coats and scrubs.

The Young Lords later founded the Lincoln Detox center at the Lincoln Hospital.

== Controversy ==
Though the majority of the Lincoln hospital staff and administration validated the concerns the Young Lords, some believed the hospital takeover was detrimental to the health of the patients who resided in the hospital at the time. Doctors complained that the Young Lords' takeover instilled fear among the hospital staff and many were not present to take care of the patients who were in critical condition. There were also controversies regarding the Young Lords Party interactions with the New York City Police Department.
