= CFUN =

CFUN may refer to:

- CKKS-FM, a radio station (107.5/104.9 FM) licensed to Chilliwack, British Columbia, Canada and Vancouver, British Columbia, Canada, which previously held the call sign CFUN.
- CFTE, a radio station (1410 AM) licensed to Vancouver, British Columbia, Canada, which held the call sign CFUN from 1955 to 1969 and again from 1973 to 2009.
- Community for Unified Newark, a precursor to the Congress of Afrikan People
