= The Young Lords: A Reader =

Historical documentation

The Young Lords: A Reader (2010), is a collection of speeches, essays, and images related to the Puerto Rican movement organization, Young Lords, founded in Chicago. Dr. Darrel Enck-Wanzer, its editor, uses his background studies in communication and culture to create a source book for the revolutionary organization. The Young Lords: A Reader was published in 2010, 42 years after the mass evictions and gentrification in the Lincoln Park neighborhood of Chicago that led to the organization's founding. This book includes a foreword by former Young Lords Iris Morales and Denise Oliver-Vélez.

While historical documentation of the Young Lords in Chicago exists mostly through oral history, the New York City chapter's actions are preserved in printed archival materials, like the newspaper Pa'lante.

Editor Darrel Enck-Wanzer states in the introduction of the book that the editors' motivation for publishing this collection of Young Lords archival materials was the lack of historical acknowledgment of the group and their political actions: "If only the history of [the Young Lords] had been written by now... It is unjust that when the name 'Young Lords' is uttered, most people have little or no understanding of what Marta Moreno calls, 'this group of young men and women of color who made significant impact on history.' This book represents an attempt to right that wrong and to set the historical record straight..."

This book developed out of Enck-Wanzer's own research in the Department of Communication and Culture at Indiana University. According to Enck-Wanzer, this book "only scratches the surface of a vast body of discourse by the Young Lords... [it] is an attempt at a fair introduction that offers breadth and some depth; but it is far from a comprehensive collection."
