= Denise Oliver-Velez =

American academic activist and community organizer (1947–2026)

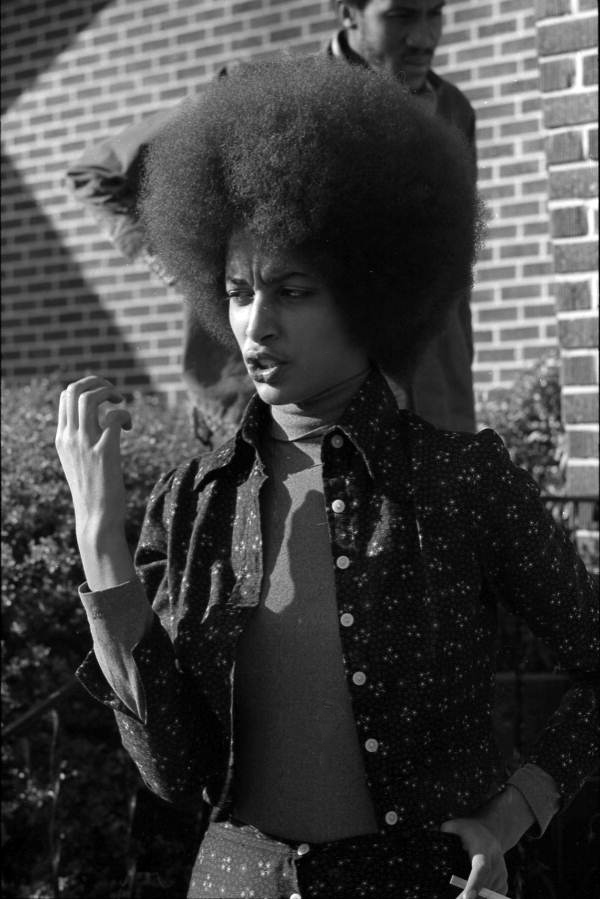
- Oliver-Velez in 1971
- Born: Denise Roberts Oliver; August 1, 1947; New York City, U.S.
- Died: July 15, 2026 (aged 78); Kingston, New York, U.S.
- Political party: Young Lords; Black Panther Party
- Movement: Black Power Movement

Denise Oliver-Velez (née Denise Roberts Oliver; August 1, 1947 – July 15, 2026) was an American educator, editor, activist, and community organizer. She was a contributing editor to the blog Daily Kos, and was an adjunct professor of anthropology and women's studies at SUNY New Paltz.

== Early life ==
Oliver-Velez was born in Brooklyn on August 1, 1947, the daughter of George Bodine Oliver, an actor and professor of dramatic literature at Nassau Community College and a Tuskegee Airman, and Marjorie Roberts Oliver.

== Education ==
=== Early education and activism ===
In September 1960, Oliver-Velez enrolled in Music and Art High School. During her teenage years, Oliver-Velez participated in civil rights work as a member of the Queens branch of the NAACP, which was led by former New York City judge William Booth. In 1963, Oliver-Velez blocked bulldozers as part of a civil disobedience action Booth organized to demand employment for black workers at a Rochdale Village construction project.

=== Howard University ===
In the fall of 1965, Denise Oliver-Velez transferred to Howard University after a year enrolled in Hunter College. At Howard University in 1968, Oliver-Velez was suspended due to her refusal to "behave like a nice Howard lady". While she attended Howard University, she joined the Student Nonviolent Coordinating Committee and participated in Students for a Democratic Society. Oliver-Velez, along with a small group of fellow black activists including H. Rap Brown, started a campaign to improve Howard University's political and cultural methods of showing awareness to struggles of black students and administration.

== Activism ==
=== Young Lords ===
==== Women's struggles within the Young Lords ====
Oliver-Velez was a member of the leftist organization the Young Lords in the late 1960s and early 1970s and was one of the founders of its New York Branch. While in the Young Lords, she and others challenged one of the organization's points in its 13-Point Program and Platform, "Revolutionary Machismo". She stated: "Machismo is reactionary, so you can't have revolutionary machismo. We women weren't having it. So we made a very different kind of statement. 'We want equality for women. Down with machismo and male chauvinism.'"

Felipe Luciano invited Oliver-Velez to a meeting at Amiri Baraka's house in Newark, New Jersey, to discuss a stronger alliance with the Young Lords. She was the only woman from the Young Lords invited, and after Oliver-Velez's questions about women's roles were ignored, she left the meeting concerned.

The women's caucus issued demands to the Central Committee of the Young Lords that called for an end to sexism and the full inclusion of women into the leadership of the Lords. The Central Committee reacted by promoting Oliver-Velez and Gloria Fontanez to the Central Committee. They also adopted a new slogan, "¡Abajo con el machismo!" (Down with Machismo!). However, women still faced sexism within the party regularly. Oliver-Velez became aware of gendered assumptions made by the Central Committee about who could and could not perform certain tasks. Even when women were assigned to posts in various ministries, including the Defense Ministry, they were disproportionately assigned traditional "women's work" like child care and secretarial tasks.

==== Roles within the Young Lords ====
Denise Oliver-Velez was the first woman elected to the Young Lords Party Central Committee. Oliver-Velez first served as the Young Lords' Minister of Finance, held the position of Officer of the Day in 1969, then in 1970 was appointed Minister of Economic Development, becoming the highest ranking woman in the party. Despite their considerable presence in the Young Lords, female members were consistently overlooked to occupy high-ranking leadership positions.

==== YLP split ====
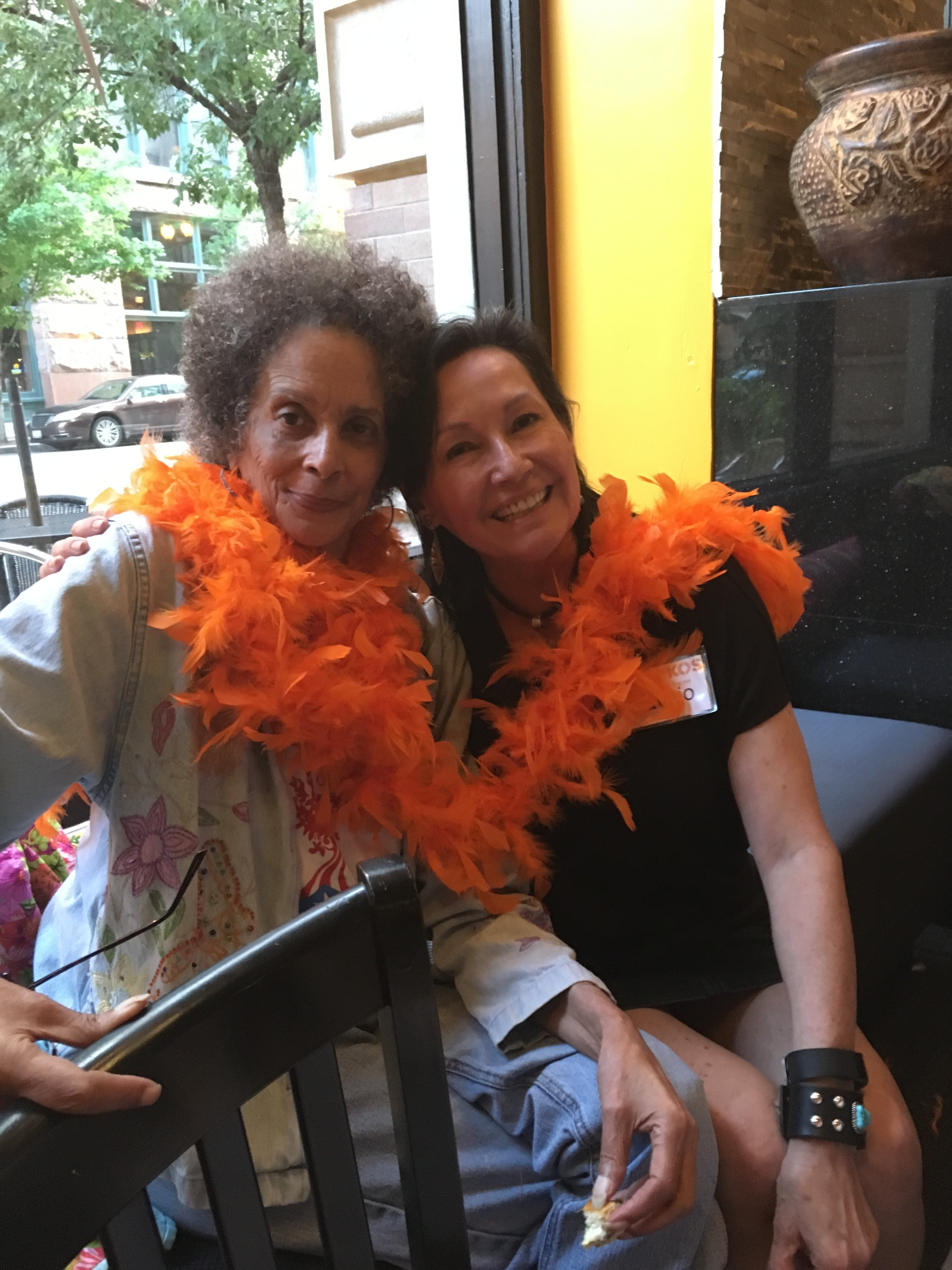
Denise Oliver-Velez (on the left) with Neeta Lind, at Netroots Nation in 2016.

By May 1970, the New York section of the Young Lords followed its then-Central Committee (which included Oliver-Velez as Officer of the Day) and decided to break away from the national Young Lords' office in Chicago, renaming their new group the Young Lords Party (YLP). The separation was never a hostile one and had more to do with the rapid development of the group, friendly competition between cities, and infiltration by government groups trying to create conflict between the chapters.

==== Publishing contributions ====
Oliver-Velez was one of the prominent contributors to the Young Lords Party's bilingual newspaper, Pa'lante. Oliver-Velez wrote and edited articles for Pa'lante newspaper as well as producing political artwork and publishing and distributing the newspaper. She was also included in the original Young Lords Party team, where she helped to create the newspaper's first layouts.

In 1970, Oliver-Velez helped construct the YLP's Position Paper on Women, theorizing the intersection of race and class in the lives of women of color. She and another former Young Lords member, Iris Morales, wrote a foreword for The Young Lords: A Reader (2010), in which the paper was reprinted.

=== Vista volunteer ===
Oliver-Velez joined the Real Great Society (RGS), a Puerto Rican East Harlem youth collective with connections to anti-poverty programs. She also worked with University of the Streets to reform New York youth gangs. Through networks from University of the Streets, Oliver-Velez taught black and Puerto Rican students who were expelled from New York public schools about black and Puerto Rican history.

=== Other activism ===
Oliver-Velez was also an HIV/AIDS activist and a member of the Black Panther Party. She published ethnographic research as part of HIV/AIDS intervention projects.

== Later life and death ==
Oliver-Velez was a program director and co-founder of WPFW-FM in Washington, D.C., Pacifica's first minority-controlled radio station, and worked in public broadcasting and community media for many years.

She was also the executive director of the Black Filmmaker Foundation.

Oliver-Velez is featured in the 2014 feminist documentary film She's Beautiful When She's Angry.

In August 2020, Oliver-Velez gave an interview on Bryan Knight's Tell A Friend podcast, where she spoke about her life and activism in the Young Lords.

Oliver-Velez died at her home in Kingston, New York, on July 15, 2026, at the age of 78, after a brief battle with cancer.

== Personal life ==
Oliver-Velez's first marriage to filmmaker Warrington Hudlin, with whom she collaborated on the short film Color (1983), ended in divorce. She later married Philip Nadhiyr Velez.
