= Lincoln Detox =

Former drug detoxification clinic in the South Bronx, New York

Geography
- Location: 234 East 149th Street, The Bronx, New York, United States
- Coordinates: 40°49′N 73°55′W

History
- Opened: 1970
- Closed: 1978

Links
- Lists: Hospitals in New York State

Lincoln Detox was a drug detoxification clinic in Lincoln Hospital in the South Bronx. It was founded in 1970 by members and affiliates of the Black Panther Party, the Republic of New Afrika, the Young Lords, and Students for a Democratic Society. The clinic offered holistic drug rehabilitation, employing acupuncture, political education classes informed, among other ideologies, by Marxism, and community service. It became known as "The People's Program."

== History ==
=== Background and Conditions at Lincoln Hospital ===
According to New York Times coverage published the following day, "the demonstrators demanded no cutback in services or jobs, the quick completion of the new Lincoln Hospital, door‐to door preventative care emphasizing tests for lead poisoning, anemia and tuberculosis and drug addiction, and a day care center for patients who have to bring their children to the hospital." This was not the first time that these demands had been presented.

Weeks before on June 27, 1970, a rally had been held at St. Mary's Park in response to budget cuts, and the fatal mistreatment of 31-year-old Lincoln patient Carmen Rodríguez, wherein what should have been a routine abortion procedure became an avoidable death. Doctors failed to read her medical chart and note a cardiovascular condition of Rodríguez's, and administered a saline solution that triggered an allergic reaction sending her into a four-day coma, and eventually killing her days later, on July 20.

In an interview at the rally, Young Lord member Felipe Luciano would explain: "What we want this rally for is to express our desire to have community-worker control of Lincoln Hospital, a hospital that for some time has been condemned...paint is chipping from the Emergency Room, our uncles, our grandmothers, our mothers, have died in that hospital, and nobody has pushed malpractice suits--not the politicians who we've elected, nor the officials that's supposed to speak for the Puerto Rican people."

=== July 1970 Occupation ===
At 5:15am on July 14, 1970, a group of 150 persons led by members of the Young Lords occupied the Lincoln Hospital School of Nursing at 141st Street and Bruckner Boulevard for twelve hours and presented a list of demands that the hospital's administrator at the time, Dr. Antero Lecot, called "valid."

At an earlier news conference, Young Lords member Pablo Yoruba Guzman had declared, "We are here with nothing but love for our people...we will leave this hospital only when it starts serving the people."

Young Lords member and health lieutenant Gloria Cruz said that "The hospital had been taken to release its potential for the benefits of both patients and hospital staff. Lincoln Hospital is only butcher shop that kills patients and frustrates workers from serving these patients. This is because Lincoln exists under a capitalist system that only looks for profit. But even this system made an effort at scrapping this butcher shop by condemning this building 25 years ago."

=== List of Demands ===
The full and exact list of demands read as follows:

1. NO CUTBACKS IN JOBS OR SERVICES IN THE EMERGENCY ROOM OR SECTION K.
2. IMMEDIATE FUNDS TO COMPLETE THE BUILDING OF AND FULLY STAFF THE NEW LINCOLN HOSPITAL
3. DOOR TO DOOR PREVENTIVE CARE PROGRAM EMPHASIZING NUTRITION DRUG ADDICTION, CHILD AND SENIOR CITIZEN CARE.
4. WE WANT A PERMANENT 24 HOUR COMPLAINT TABLE.
5. WE WANT $140 A WEEK MINIMUM WAGE FOR ALL WORKERS.
6. WE WANT A DAYCARE CENTER FOR THE CHILDREN OF PATIENTS, WORKERS, AND VISITORS AT LINCOLN HOSPITAL.
7. WE WANT TOTAL DETERMINATION OF ALL HEALTH SERVICES THROUGH A COMMUNITY-WORKER BOARD TO OPERATE LINCOLN HOSPITAL. THIS BOARD MUST HAVE SHOWN ITS COMMITMENT TO SERVE THE PEOPLE."

=== Patient Rights and Policy Influence ===
As recounted in several documented occasions by community and labor organizer, and one of the founding members of Lincoln Detox, Cleo Silvers, these demands emerged from thousands of complaints gathered at a complaint table set up in the Emergency Room of Lincoln Hospital by herself and several peers, and would inform what would eventually become known as the Patient's Bill of Rights, which she describes in a 2016 interview as "the result of a collaboration between members of the Young Lords and the Black Panther Party, with the assistance of the doctors, and written by me. Although it is considerably watered down now, you still find that Patient's Bill of Rights on the wall of every hospital. It's not as radical as the original . . . but still includes some of the issues we highlighted, such as the ability to have access to your medical records."

In the documentary film Dope is Death (2020, dir. Mia Donovan) Silvers insists: "Don't let anybody tell you that there was one minute of disruption of the delivery of health care at Lincoln Hospital when the Young Lords took it over. Never. We had our first conference where we said the hospital had been taken over and we were willing to negotiate, but these were the demands." These demands were not met right away, however, and this would not be the last occupation of the Lincoln Hospital.

=== Negotiations and Aftermath of July Occupation ===
Dr. Lacot, along with assistant to Mayor John Lindsay, Sid Davidoff, and other representatives of the city's new Health and Hospital Corporation, which had just taken control of the city's hospitals on July 1, met for over four hours with members of the Young Lords, a patient-worker committee of the hospital known as the Think Lincoln Committee, and members of Health Revolutionary Unity Movement, a citywide committee of hospital workers.

Davidoff claimed to prefer that the police not become involved in a more direct capacity, but emphasized that this was contingent on the building of a new hospital not being announced, though he promised the negotiators that this key demand of theirs would ultimately be met, a promise that was taken with a large grain of salt.

Around 4:30pm, Dr. Lacot and the other negotiators emerged from a third‐floor library room and announced that an agreement had been reached. According to a New York Times article, "while it was being typed, the Young Lords learned that a police officer, in civilian clothes, had attempted to enter the building. They charged that he had tried to seize one of their members who was checking credentials at the entrance and called the negotiations off. The agreement included an end to the hospital takeover, but the Young Lords were given permission to run certain community programs within the hospital, with the aid of hospital staff and administration."

As the NYPD began to mobilize to raid the hospital, someone made the suggestion that the Lords and other demonstrators leave under the guise of medical attire through the only exit that had not been covered by the police. In the words of Juan Gonzalez, with the police poised to take action, the demonstrators had to make a choice between staying and "[forcing] the mayor's hand and [having] the police [enter], or...figure out a way to declare a victory and leave."

Silvers recalled, "The adrenaline is pumping because we all know we're gonna go do something really big. We could all be killed. We could all be shot up. Beaten up."

=== November 1970 Takeover and Creation of the Program ===
Four months later on November 10, 1970, as the hospital hesitated over the funding of the drug detoxification program that had been proposed, activists took over Lincoln Hospital yet another time. Funds had been anticipated from the city's Addiction Services Program (ASA), but Lincoln's track record overshadowed its promises.

Having established overnight control of the sixth floor, the activists sought to "implement a drug program that would serve the community effectively and be run by the community."

At noon on November 11, "35 addicts along with workers from the hospital and community people" established what they called "The People's Program". Later that day, cops in riot gear broke through the barricade, arresting 15 people.

Eventually, organizers arrived at an agreement with the hospital, and were granted use of Lincoln's anticipated ASA funds; the use of the old Nurse's Auditorium in the Administration Building for the Detox Program; and a little office space in the Psychiatry Department.

== Program Structure and Activities ==
In the program, participants learned about their addiction within a political context, exploring how their addiction harmed themselves, their family, and their community.

The program also explored the role of governmental institutions such as the CIA and the NYPD in drug trafficking and profiteering as well as how drug addiction has worked against progressive and revolutionary change.

Activities at the program included ones by the People's Program court collective, which recruited and assisted lawyers to help some of the thousands of poor people who were being railroaded through courthouses into prisons.

They helped organized rent strikes, building takeovers, women's health work, and organizations of construction workers. This, and much more information was written in a pamphlet published by White Lightning, "a revolutionary organization founded by ex-addicts."

They wrote: "The people at Lincoln Detox see that all these struggles and many more are necessary before the roots of drug addiction can be ripped out of our land."

== Staffing and Organization ==
The clinic was staffed largely by former patients who had detoxified through the program. In the first five years of its existence, it detoxified 35,000 users of heroin and methadone.

Mutulu Shakur shares: "Every department was a collective, so the administration was a collective, the counselors were the counselor collective, the nurses aid, the medical department, so there was no leadership, there was no one person in charge, it was a collective, a collective effort...there was no one single leader. We tried to imitate the socialist methods around the world, you know, from Russia, to China, to Cuba, and so that's what we were trying to do–that's why I call it socialized medicine, because it had never been done in America before."

== Methadone: Background and Critique ==
Methadone, a synthetic narcotic first synthesized by German scientists during World War II because of a shortage of morphine, was introduced into the U.S. in 1947 as an analgesic under the generic name Dolophine.

Its use as a narcotics maintenance treatment modality for heroin dependence emerged in the 1960s, as a result of the work of physician-scientist of the Rockefeller Institute for Medical Research and chair of the committee on major medical problems for the Health Research Council of the City of New York, Vincent P. Dole, who, in 1964, began clinical tests with methadone.

By the early 1970s, methadone maintenance programs were being established in clinics across the country.

At the time of the White Lightning pamphlet's publishing (in or c. 1974), "over 100,000 people [were] on methadone maintenance programs...almost totally financed by federal grants and medicaid payments", and methadone had become "virtually the only drug treatment offered by the Veteran's Administration for the thousands of vets who come home with serious drug problems."

Per The Rockefeller University's website, "[methadone] is not a curative and must be administered to patients indefinitely."

=== Criticism ===
White Lightning members wrote further on the subject:

Many people who are not addicted at the time, are forced onto methadone maintenance by judges, parole boards, and the welfare department. For drug victims, it's much easier to get on welfare, if they are on methadone maintenance programs. Many are tricked into believing methadone is a cure, and then realize that they have been cruelly betrayed. Maintenance programs won't let you detoxify, even if you are pregnant, unless they feel you are 'psychologically ready'.

Everyone who is in a maintenance program is registered on computer tapes with a city drug agency, and also the private "Community Treatment Foundation" at the Rockefeller Institute. The computer system makes it very easy to locate and control victims of methadone maintenance.

Almost routinely, victims are offered methadone maintenance as an alternative to serving their prison sentences. We have received many letters from prisoners who chose to remain in jail, rather than be on methadone maintenance.

[Richard] Nixon's special office for drug abuse received $1.7 billion for their budget in 1972. 95% of this money supported methadone maintenance rather than drug-free programs. Most of this money was channeled thru the Law Enforcement Assistance Administration (LEAA), which also funds lobotomies, psycho-surgery, and behavioral modification programs in prisons. LEAA supplies tanks and sophisticated weapons to local police departments....

In the third of a series of online Zoom meetings hosted by the National Acupuncture Detoxification Association (NADA) in 2021, with the purpose of exploring the history of the revolutionary use of acupuncture in the U.S., former Lincoln Detox member and acupuncturist Walter Bosque elaborated on the harmful implementation of methadone as a pharmaceutical "treatment":

Methadone was the first synthetic opioid that people got addicted to, and here we now [had] an opium epidemic...It started back then, in the 60s, when the Rockefeller program created the first methadone programs in Lexington, Kentucky...when people got in trouble, they were sent to Lexington, Kentucky, they were put on methadone, and then they stayed on methadone for the rest of their lives. So we didn't want that. We didn't want our communities addicted to heroin or methadone, because methadone became a problem.

=== Patient Experiences ===
Half of the Lincoln Detox's patients arrived "with methadone habits", having acquired methadone either from maintenance programs, or illegally on the streets.

Detoxification from methadone usually took two to three months, and it was reported that many were never able to withdraw from it due to the extremely severe withdrawal symptoms of insomnia, diarrhea, depression, and bone pain, with simultaneous addiction to alcohol and barbiturates having been common among those dependent on methadone.

According to a Drug Enforcement Administration figure from the time, methadone overdose deaths in New York City outnumbered heroin overdose deaths "by five to one."

Lincoln Detox was the only place in New York where methadone victims could be detoxified whenever they wanted.

== Development of Acupuncture Treatment ==
=== Origins (1971) ===
On the implementation of acupuncture as a treatment for drug detoxification, Walter Bosque recounted in the second of the NADA History Series panels held in May 2021 that "In 1971, when we started looking for an alternative to methadone, we read an article that states that this Bangkok acupuncturist is treating his client for some of his sinuses or whatever he had, and when... he finished his first session, the client confessed to the acupuncturist that he had been smoking opium...since he was thirteen years old, and now he was in his 20s, and [after acupuncture] he had no desire to smoke opium anymore." "There was six of us there, and we would each read a paragraph, and when we read that article, everyone's sort of light was turned on, and we said, 'wait, why don't we do this?'"

Miguel "Mickey" Melendez explains:

...continuing with our studies and things of that nature, we were very much into Chinese politics at the time, and one thing that came out, the whole issue around health, and looking at China's health programs….China had a really huge opium problem after the revolution and the late 40s, so we got very much interested in this alternative, you know, as opposed to using methadone, which really is a fascist drug because it was developed in Germany, because during the war, Germany couldn't get into Africa to get poppy seeds for morphine, so they used methadone for their field morphine, and actually, the generic name for methadone, is named after Adolf Hitler; it's called Dolophine. And so, we understood the necessity of using [acupuncture], and diminishing doses [of methadone]....

=== Early Practise ===
In the first of the NADA History Series panels, Cleo Silvers recalls:

...it was Panama Alba, Mutulu Shakur, and Walter Bosque that went down to Chinatown and got their acupuncture needles and an acupuncture map and began to practice on themselves and on oranges, with the help of some doctors from Canada and some doctors from [the U.S] that had some training and understanding–because the purpose of Lincoln Detox was to have a detox program that did not use chemicals or drugs as a form of rehabilitation but to use two things: to use acupuncture and to use the training and to recognize that once they were clean and had a life of their own that they could share this with people in the community and that they should become organizers.

Former detox patient and eventual Lincoln Detox member Panama Alba elaborates:

...we went to Chinatown, we bought ear charts, and we bought acupuncture needles. We began attempting to treat each other... the lung point, and other points that helped people relax and overcome anxieties, and that's how [the use of] acupuncture [at Lincoln Detox] began.

=== Legal Challenges ===
The incorporation of acupuncture into the detoxification program, however, did not come without its challenges and obstacles.

Acupuncture could not legally be practiced unless under the supervision of a trained doctor of Western medicine. Per Alba's account, "the medical community had huge problems with it, had problems with people who were not medical doctors treating...so, immediately, their rules began to change. They made it so that at first, in order for you to practice acupuncture, you would have to be under the supervision of a medical doctor who knew absolutely nothing about acupuncture, okay–but, it became illegal to practice acupuncture unless it was under a medical supervisor, a doctor, and they began to take control of the industry. We, at Lincoln Detox, continued to use acupuncture. It became very popular, it helped a lot of people, and people began coming to Lincoln Hospital wanting to be treated at the acupuncture clinic that was set up for substance abusers, wanting to be treated for other things."

In the second of the NADA History Series meetings, Silvers recounts the process. She identifies Steven Levine as the first medical doctor to supervise the use of acupuncture at the Lincoln Detox Program. Explains Bosque: "...we hired two acupuncturists–a Chinese woman, and I believe he was a Japanese man, and they started doing the auricular therapy."

=== Expansion and Training ===
Eventually, the Lincoln Detox program was able to fund sending several of its members to study acupuncture at the Quebec Acupuncture Institute of Montreal. They returned with diplomas and practiced acupuncture at Lincoln Detox, teaching others at the program how to use acupuncture.

== Key Figures ==
The late New Afrikan activist and member of the Black Liberation Army Mutulu Shakur was eventually invited to become a part of the program at Lincoln Detox by founding activists. "Once we had doctors from Lincoln Hospital who said that they were gonna be responsible," recounts Cleo Silvers, "that's when we brought Mutulu in. Because we had a medical director, and we wanted to have a director who had revolutionary consciousness." In one of Bosque's accounts, "In 1977, we returned with our acupuncture degrees, so Mutulu decided, 'we'll open up a school and we'll call it Lincoln Detox Acupuncture School'. And we did it. Now, did we have permission? No. Were we gonna ask for permission? No, 'cause they would've said no anyway. We just did it."

Shakur would later be involved, along with several others, in the armed robbery of Brinks truck in 1981, becoming an FBI Ten Most Wanted Fugitive and going underground before being captured and sentenced to sixty years in prison. In an interview, he would recall: "They charged me with six armored truck robberies, the liberation of Assatta Shakur, using illegally gained funds to finance camp for Black children in Mississippi, and to put a acupuncture clinic in Harlem, were part of the so-called enterprise I was accused of financing with illegally gained funds."

== Closure ==
The clinic was violently shut down by Ed Koch, the NYPD, and Lincoln Hospital on November 27, 1978.

Cleo Silvers explains:

Corporate doctors at that time saw everything that we were doing as a threat. Because we were saying–and the other thing that is so important–is that we were calling for free quality healthcare for all. That was the bottom line for all of this, that we demanded free quality healthcare for all. That was the first call, for free healthcare, which is now what everybody is talking about. It's a big deal, but that was the first time in the 1960s and 70s, and it came from the same group of people.

== Sources ==
- Churchill, Ward Vander Wall. The COINTELPRO Papers: documents from the FBI's secret wars against dissent. 2002. p. 309.
