= League of Revolutionary Struggle (Marxist–Leninist) =

Marxist–Leninist movement

- Abbreviation: LRS(M-L) or LRS(ML)
- Founded: September 1978
- Dissolved: 8 September 1990
- Merger of: Initially; August 29th Movement; I Wor Kuen; Later; East Wind Collective; Seize the Time Collective; New York Collective; Revolutionary Communist League (M-L-M)
- Succeeded by: Unity Organizing Committee; Socialist Organizing Network
- Ideology: Marxism-Leninism-Maoism; New Communism; Anti-racism; Anti-imperialism
- Political position: Far-left

The League of Revolutionary Struggle (Marxist–Leninist) was a Marxist–Leninist^{[1]} movement in the United States formed in 1978 by merging communist organizations. It was dissolved by the organization's leadership in 1990.

The LRS(M-L) was formed from a merger of the Asian American communist organization I Wor Kuen and the Chicano-Latino communist organization August 29th Movement (M-L) in September 1978. By 1979, they absorbed a number of other ethnic based radical groups including the East Wind Collective of Japanese Americans in Los Angeles, the Seize the Time Collective of Chicanos and African Americans in San Francisco and The New York Collective of Puerto Ricans and Dominicans. Early in 1980 it also merged with the Revolutionary Communist League (Marxist-Leninist-Mao Tse-tung Thought) led by Amiri Baraka. This organization, formerly known as the Congress of Afrikan People, was composed mostly of African-Americans and had stressed Black cultural nationalism. When this merger occurred they issued a joint statement declaring,"Our unity signals a big advance in this struggle for Marxist-Leninist unity and for a single, unified, vanguard communist party."^{[2]}

== History of Communism in the US ==
Communism took hold of the United States' left wing politics primarily following the Russian Revolution of October 1917. The early 1920s was marked by surges in nativism and racism. Meanwhile, ethnic communism thrived among the Workers Party, which was renamed as the Communist Party USA. The center of the movement revolved around the American communist party.

The Communist Party USA (CPUSA) was formally established in 1919 following the 1917 Russian Revolution. The Tzarist autocracy was overthrown and the Soviet Union was formed. The members of CPUSA were mostly former members of the socialist part of America. However, since the socialist party opposed the Russian Revolution and banned members who supported it, many of these exiled members joined the Communist Party, a group more left-wing than the Socialists.

CPUSA came after attack following World War II when anti-communist sentiment was on the rise. The party's steadfast support for the Soviet Union was not received well. Coupled with anti-Soviet sentiment in the US, communism became increasingly unwelcome in the United States. CPUSA historically took its power from labor unions. However, as these unions were dispelled in 1949 and 1950, the party did not have a solid support system to rely on. Furthermore, left wing organizations were faced with McCarthyism in the early 1950s.

Today, CPUSA remains with its existing political ideology. The parks seeks cooperation with other political groups in order to achieve effective change in the areas it trumpets.

The League of Revolutionary Struggle considers itself to be the heir to CPUSA. LRS criticized CPUSA for failing to work towards revolution and for turning into a revisionist group that advocated for electoral politics and "promoted the interests of an imperialist Soviet Union." In the eyes of LRS, the Soviet Union had turned into an expansionist superpower similar to the US. As a result, the group opposed both American and Soviet aggression and was against Soviet involvement in Afghanistan.

Unlike CPUSA, LRS made active effort towards creating an alliance between working-class people and oppressed nationalities. It sought to create an alliance in an effort to establish a socialist state by overthrowing the current capitalist one.

== Origins ==
=== Asian American New Left ===
From the late 60s to the early 70s, Asian Americans became increasingly active in the New Left movement. This is evidenced by their participation in New Left activities such as the Free Speech Movement, Students for a Democratic Society, the Weatherman, and the Progressive Labor Party.^{[3]}

The Asian American Left, however, separated itself from the dominant New Left movement after highlighting racism and national oppression as pressing issues that were not being addressed by the mainstream movement. As a result, Asian American marxists added self-determination to their agenda.

Activists mobilized around and within Asian American communities, addressing health care and housing issues, the lack of Asian American history in university curriculums, and the Vietnam War.

The Asian American New Left had stronger ties with antiwar and the Black Power Movements than with the Old Left. The 1960s was a dynamic period for the formation of radical immigrant identities. Social activism peaked as broad political struggles as the Black Power movement and the civil rights movement erupted. Asian Americans embraced a framework that trumpeted solidarity among colonized people.

Meanwhile, the political climate was continuing to push Asian American youth towards militancy. As they grappled with the hegemonic discourse of the model minority myth, Asian youth started to question American democracy. With the Vietnam War raging, the AAM's anti-racist and anti-imperialist stance did not fit within the "Bring the Boys Home" chants. Asian Americans identified with the Vietnamese communists as Asian peoples defending themselves against imperial encroachment on their independence and self-determination. This solidarity was further strengthened by their racial connection to the Vietnamese.

Asian Americans were active in community issues as well as international problems. Drawing from Chairman Mao Zedong's Cultural Revolution, they adhered to the phrase, "Serve the People." As a result, when the International Hotel or I-Hotel of San Francisco was evicting elderly tenants, they rallied for the community by demanding universities to support their communities and encouraging students to join the protest.

=== I Wor Kuen ===
I Wor Kuen (lit., "the points of justice and harmony") was a Marxist-Leninist organization in the United States that had ties with the Asian national movement and the industrial working class. It was founded in 1969.

I Wor Kuen became a national organization in 1971 when it merged with the San Francisco-based Red Guard Party. Following the example of the Black Panther Party and committed to Mao Zedong, the Red Guard Party advocated for an armed struggle. The organization viewed itself as a military group rather than a political movement. Spending most of its activity on military operations rather than mobilizing on political issues, the Party broke up. Nevertheless, many of its members moved to I Wor Kuen.

IWK was an integral part of the US revolutionary movement as it applied Marxism-Leninism-Mao Zedong thought to the US revolution.

Drawing from the Chinese revolution, including the Cultural Revolution, IWK saw itself as a revolutionary organization dedicated to uniting other revolutionary forces in toppling US imperialism. It first formed in New York City in late 1969 by Asian American revolutionaries from diverse backgrounds. During that same year, the Red Guard was formed in San Francisco. In the summer of 1971, IWK and the Red Guard Party merged.

The organization was centered around 12 points:

12 Points

1. We want self-determination for all Asian Amerikans.
2. We want self-determination for all Asians.
3. We want liberation of all third world peoples and other oppressed peoples
4. We want an end to male chauvinism and sexual exploitation.
5. We want community control of our institutions and land.
6. We want an education that exposes the true history of western imperialism in Asia and around the world: which teaches us the hardships and struggles of our ancestors in this land and which reveals the truly decadent exploitive nature of Amerikan society.
7. We want decent housing and health and child care.
8. We want freedom for all political prisoners and all Asians.
9. We want an end to the Amerikan military.
10. We want an end to racism.
11. We want an end to the geographic boundaries of Amerika.
12. We want a socialist society.

IWK channeled efforts into addressing communities issues. During its first two years of existence it jump-started campaigns against poor living conditions and initiated programs that served the community.

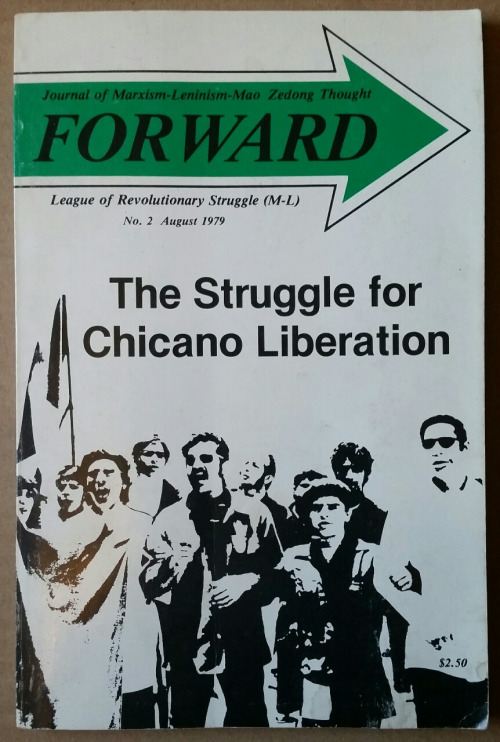
The Chicano movement fed into LRS.

=== Chicano Movement ===
The Chicano movement rose during the late 1960s and early 1970s. During this period, the United States was engaged in a war in Vietnam and other Indochinese countries. This conflict was viewed as an act of aggression against the people of Vietnam. Meanwhile, the Soviet Union, a social-imperialist power, was in direct opposition against the US for hegemony.

The Black nationalist movement was the center of the rising mass movements in the US. Inspired by their resistance, the Chicano community channeled their efforts into community work, workplace organizing, and student activism. Some of the central Chicano groups from this era include the August 29th Collective, the East Bay Labor Collective, La Raza Workers Collective, and a collective from New Mexico.

Although the Chicano movement did not have a strong grasp of Marxism-Leninism, it understood imperialism and the effects it had on the Chicano and Latino community. Imperialism was the root of their misery and consequently had to be overthrown.

The Chicano movement developed a close working relationship with the Black Panther Party, the Young Lords Party, the Brown Berets, and the Red Guards.

=== The August 29th Movement ===
The August 29th Movement (ATM) was a Chicano communist movement based in Los Angeles, CA. It was formed at the Unity Conference of May 1974 after the August 29th Collective of Los Angeles, the East Bay Labor Collective of Oakland, and the La Raza Workers Collective of San Francisco merged. ATM regularly published a monthly political newspaper by the name of the Revolutionary Cause which reached people throughout the country. Since the movement's base stemmed from the Chicano nationality, the publication was printed in both English and Spanish.

The group distinctively defined Chicanos living in the Southwestern United States as an oppressed nation, not an oppressed minority.

ATM stems from the Brown Berets, a group formed from working class Chicano youth from across California and the Southwest. The movement formed following the footsteps of the Black Panther Party and stood for building a revolutionary front against national oppression. Unlike CPUSA, it rejected a peaceful transition to socialism.

Youth started organizing in response to the oppression felt in school. As a result, they initially began by spearheading school walkouts and mobilizing around freeing Chicano political prisoners such as Chavez Ortiz. In 1973, La Raza organized a walkout in opposition to the trade union bureaucrats of the Furniture Workers Union. As Chicano workers engaged in the workout, it set an example for the rest of the Chicano national movement and is regarded as the high point of worker's struggle in Los Angeles.

ATM was active in La Raza and was more geared towards working with students. While La Raza Unida Party focused on party building, the ATM Collective disagreed with this goal and started to follow its own path based on mass work. ATM was committed to an anti-revisionist ideology, clashing with the revisionist activity of the Communist League. One notable achievement of ATM was the developed of Congreso Obrero in 1973, a program set up to help Mexicano and Chicano workers to fight national oppression and to study Marxism-Leninism while on the job. Meanwhile, the Congreso Estudiantil tried to achieve the same results with Chicano students.

== Founding ==
The League of Revolutionary Struggle was created from a union between I Wor Kuen and the August 29th Movement in 1978. During the 1970s, the Marxist-Leninst movement gained traction in the United States as young revolutionary groups found themselves drawn to the anti-revisionist communist movement.

ATM and IWK were two prominent Marxist-Leninist organizations that were formed during the 1960s. ATM stemmed from the Chicano movement while IWK was a product of Asian movements. Realizing the importance of communist unity, ATM and IWK moved towards resolving their differences. Both being opposed to Trotskyist revisionists and dedicated to the working class and oppressed nationality movements, ATM and IWK shared many similarities. As a result, after a year and a half of discussions over ideological and political ideologies, the two organizations merged.

== Ideology ==
=== Marxism-Leninism ===
Marxism-Leninism is a version of Marxism developed by Vladimir Lenin. It was the ideology that served as the foundation of the first communist revolution in Russia in November 1917. Marxism-Leninism is based on the idea that a revolutionary proletarian class does not immediately emerge from capitalism. A revolutionary vanguard party is needed to lead the working class in the violent overthrow of the capitalism. Marxists-Leninists believed that after the revolution a dictatorship is needed in order to achieve communism.

Marxism-Leninism rejects religion and believes that developing countries are the key to spreading communism.

=== Maoism ===
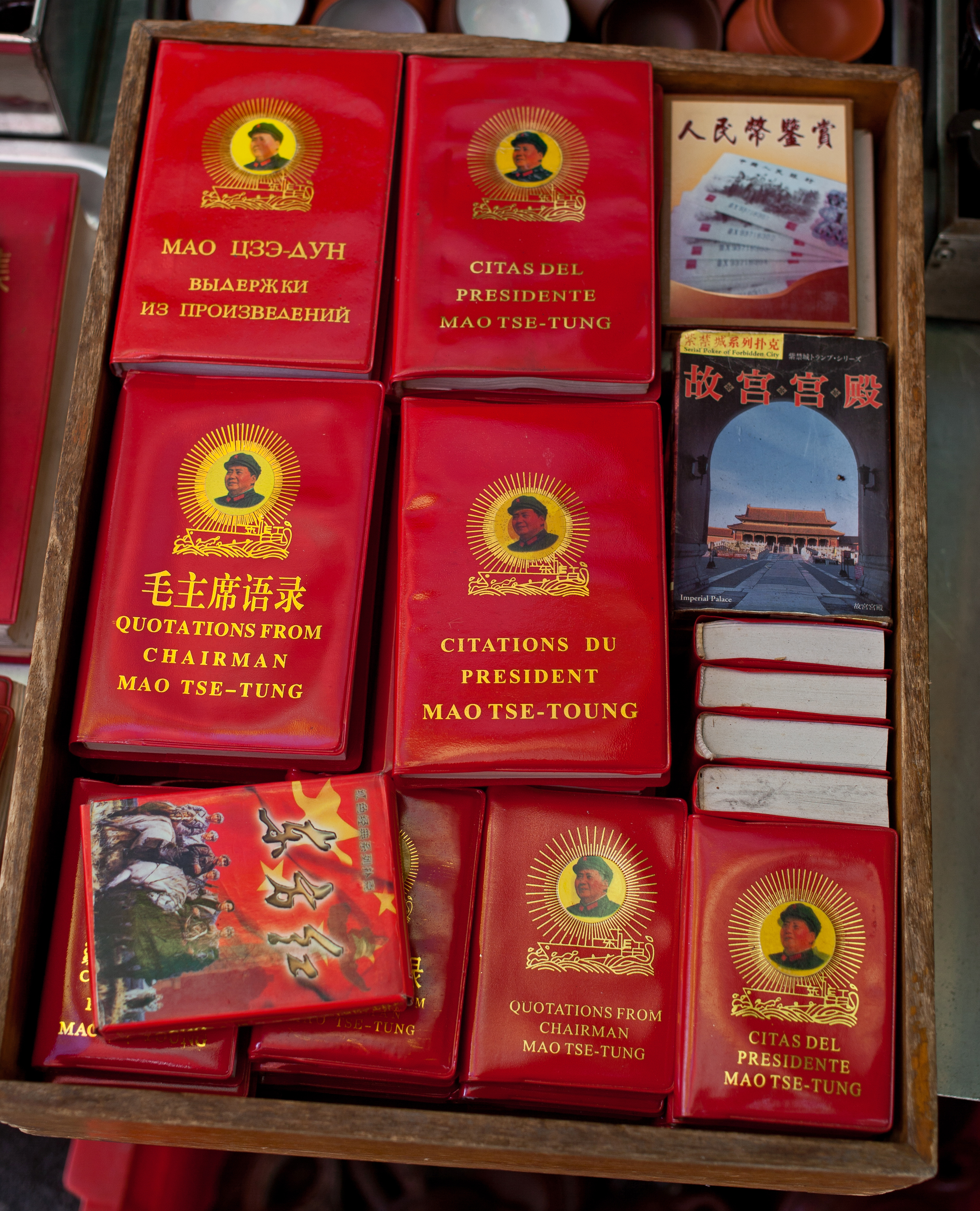
Maoism served as the foundation of Asian self-determination.

Maoism played an important role in Asian/American self-determination. The Little Red Book served as the foundation for their ideology as it provided a racialized analysis of Marxism. Asian Americans were inspired to further a joint Afro-Asian national self-determination agenda. In the Little Red Book, Chapter II directly supports Afro-Americans in their struggle against discrimination and US imperialism. Titled "Classes and Class Struggle", the chapter claims that "national struggle is a matter of class struggle" and centers its analysis on black and non-white resistance in the face of capitalism and imperialism.

"I call on the workers, peasants, revolutionary intellectuals, elements of bourgeoisie and other enlightened persons of all colors in the world, whether white, black, yellow, or brown, to unite to oppose the radical discrimination practiced by US imperialism and support the black people in their struggle against racial discrimination."

As the Chinese government started to move away from Maoist policies and grew closer with the US, LRS stated that it does not necessarily support everything China does.

=== League of Revolutionary Struggle ===
The League of Revolutionary Struggle saw itself as a single, unified Marxist-Leninist party fighting for the liberation of all oppressed people. With chapters across the country, it supported minority struggles in the United States and opposed the "domination and bullying of the two superpowers: the US and the Soviet Union." Adhering to Leninism, LRS believes that the world is divided among nations who possess the capital to exploit the rest of the globe's population and oppressed people living in those exploited countries. In their view, emancipation can only be achieve by mobilizing against imperialism and capitalism. Therefore, the working class is in need of a common revolutionary front in order to achieve their goal.

== Activity ==
The LRS(M-L) published a newspaper called Unity and a journal called Forward: Journal of Marxism-Leninism-Mao Zedong Thought. The LRS(M-L) was active in electoral work, including playing important roles in the 1984 Rainbow Coalition and the campaigns to elect Jesse Jackson for U.S. president in 1984 and 1988.When the LRS dissolved, part of the organization regrouped as the Socialist Organizing Network, which merged into Freedom Road Socialist Organization in 1994.

After the organization's dissolution, the publication of Unity was continued by the Unity Organizing Committee. Unity on January 28, 1991, emphasized "A call to build an organization for the 1990s and beyond. "

=== Jesse Jackson ===
Although Baraka had personal criticisms reserved for Jesse Jackson, he believed that the Jackson campaign overall shifted the election towards the left. Baraka called for a focus on black voter registration and pushed the Rainbow Party in the direction of independent politics.

The League of Revolutionary Struggle was involved in the anti-semitism claims surrounding Jesse Jackson. A group by the name of Jews Against Jackson, an offshoot of the radical Jewish Defense League which had been disavowed by most Jewish leaders, threatened and attacked the Jackson campaign on multiple occasions. Minister Louis Farrakhan, the black-separatist leader of the Nation of Islam, was a supporter of Jesse Jackson. He projected inflammatory remarks towards the Jewish community. Defending Jackson he said: "If you harm this brother, I warn you in the name of Allah this will be the last one you harm. Leave this servant of God alone." Following this ordeal, LRS was quick to criticize Farrakhan for not distinguishing between Judaism and Zionism. Meanwhile, Unity criticized Jackson for his slurs against Jews and called Farrakhan a nationalist.

=== Recruitment ===
The League of Revolutionary Struggle recruited idealistic students from institutions such as Berkeley, Stanford, UCLA, San Jose State, and San Francisco State. It also had influence in student organizations such as the Asian Pacific Islander Student Union, MEChA, and the African/Black Student Alliance. Recruited students called the process "secretive." As a result, many students felt uneasy about the covert operations of LRS on their college campuses. They thought that methods used to reel them in were devious and employed in an effort to further the league's own political agenda. Nevertheless, through its presence in institutions across the country, the league had students that were involved in campus politics. Collectively through its presence in other student organizations, university staff positions, and student government, LRS was able to push for progressive politics.

After involving itself in Stanford's multicultural movement, the group damaged its credibility and reputation, "The League, in its quest for revolution, has used the struggle for multiculturalism as a front. As a result of their commitment to politics rather than people, they have done more damage to multiculturalism at Stanford than anyone else." The League of Revolutionary Struggle mocked Stanford's racial-minority communities struggle, causing activists to drift from the movement. Student leaders felt as if progressive politics were dominated by the league.

Following the Stanford scandal, the league's activities were discussed and scrutinized. A conversation on the future of the League of Revolutionary Struggle was sparked, causing polarization within the group as some advocated for the organization to continue as a clandestine Marxist-Leninist organization while others wanted to replace it with a more inclusive political entity. Eventually, on September 8, 1990, the league was dismantled.

== Notable Figures ==
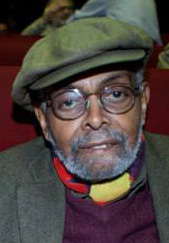
Amiri Barak--a notable leader of LRS.

=== Amiri Baraka ===
Amiri Baraka was born in Newark, New Jersey on October 7, 1934, as Everett Leroy Jones. He lived there for his entire life. He changed his name to LeRoi, meaning "the king." Later, Baraka changed his name to "Amiri", the Swahili word for "the king."

Baraka grew up in the era of the Civil Rights Movement of the 1950s and 1960s. He was heavily engaged in the Black power movement as the key organizer of the 1967 Newark Black Power Conference. In this event, they laid out the explicit political and economic agenda for the advancement of Black people. Baraka also founded the Congress of African People (CAP), an organization that linked together the forces working towards the Black liberation movement. In addition to CAP, he also spearheaded the Committed for a Unified Newark (CFUN), a community-based economic development program.

Dedicated to the national self-determination of African Americans, Amiri joined the Revolutionary Communist League which later merged with the League of Revolutionary Struggle in 1980. Baraka shifted from being a nationalist to a communist. Nevertheless, his commitment to African Americans remained steadfast as reflected by the RCL pamphlet titled The Black Nation which defined Afro-American peopled as a nation based in the Black Belt of the South. Baraka is notable for his writing.

In a 1982 essay titled Nationalism, Self-Determination, and Socialist Revolution, Amiri Baraka explores the relationship between the struggle for revolution and the struggle for democracy. Amiri was devoted to furthering the ideological and theoretical framework of the LRS. After the 1980s, however, LRS moved away from theory, causing Amiri to resign in protest.

=== Wilma Chan ===
Wilma Chan was born on October 5, 1949, in Boston, Massachusetts and was a leader of the Maoist movement in the communities of Boston and San Francisco. In the early 1980s, Chan was the Chairperson of the National Asian Struggles Commission of the League of Revolutionary Struggle. After the League of Revolutionary Struggle dissolved in 1990, she joined the Democratic Party. She served as the California State Assembly Majority Leader from 2002 to 2004 and the Assembly Majority Whip from 2001 to 2002.

=== Jean Yonemura ===
Jean Yonemura was the editor of Unity in 1989, the league's newspaper. She became involved in the League of Revolutionary Struggle as a parent of a student at Berkeley High School. Being an active member of the high school community, she served as a researcher on the Berkeley High School Diversity Project and advocated for issues of race and class. Her research focused on closing the racial achievement gap. Yonemura earned her doctorate at the University of California-Berkeley.

== International Ties ==
Chairman Mao I Wor Kuen, a group which later merged with the League of Revolutionary Struggle, was particularly inspired by Mao as evidenced by Japanese American activism in the Bay Area in 1971. Japanese Americans adhered to Mao's proposal to "serve the people." Asian Americans sought to craft strategies to get to the root of people's oppression.

While the League did not consider itself Maoist, they acknowledged that Mao's works inspired many of its members.

== Split ==
In 1990, the group split into the Unity Organizing Committee and the Socialist Organizing Network (SON). LRS decided to disavow Marxism-Leninism and to channel its energy towards electoral political, particularly the Democratic party. Most of the Asian comrades matriculated into the Unity Organizing Committee while members of SON came from diverse backgrounds as members of national minorities (Asian American, Chicano/Latino, and African American). SON later merged with the Freedom Road Socialist Organization.

The Freedom Road Socialist Organization continued the League of Revolutionary Struggle's mission to advance the theory and practice of self-determination socialism.
