= August 29th Movement =

- Abbreviation: ATM
- Notable members: Bill Gallegos; Yvonne De Los Santos; Connie Valdez; Beto Flores; Jenaro Valdez
- Founded: May 1974
- Dissolved: September 1978
- Merger of: August 29th Collective; East Bay Labor Collective; La Raza Workers Collective
- Merged into: League of Revolutionary Struggle (Marxist–Leninist)
- Newspaper: Revolutionary Cause
- Ideology: Chicano nationalism Marxism-Leninism-Maoism; Anti-imperialism; Anti-racism
- Political position: Far-left

The August 29th Movement (or August Twenty-Ninth Movement, ATM) was a Chicano communist organization that lasted from 1974 to 1978. It formed out of the Labor Committee of La Raza Unida Party in Los Angeles, and other collectives, officially forming at a Unity Conference in May 1974. It was one of several organizations that were part of the New Communist Movement, which were influenced by the thought of Mao Zedong and Joseph Stalin's theories on the National Question.

The ATM published a manifesto, "Fan The Flames: A Revolutionary Position on the Chicano National Question," in 1975. In it, the organization articulated the view that Chicanos living in the Southwestern United States were an oppressed nation due to the annexation of northern Mexico in the Mexican–American War of 1846–48, and had a right to independence. The strategy of ATM, like other NCM formations, was to build a multinational communist party.

The August Twenty-Ninth Movement published a newspaper, Revolutionary Cause, and a theoretical journal, The Red Banner.

In New Mexico, the ATM chapter entered into the Chicano Communications Center, a media organization founded by Elizabeth "Betita" Martinez. They were responsible for the destruction of an entire edition of her book 450 Years of Chicano History, one of the first Chicano histories, due to disagreement of how ATM saw the books portrayal of the Chicano National Question.

In 1978, ATM merged with I Wor Kuen, an Asian-American Communist organization, to form the League of Revolutionary Struggle.

== Publications ==
- Dasco Strike: Lessons for the M-L Movement. August 29 Movement, 1974?, 7p.
- Unity Statement, 1974.
- Fan the Flames: A Revolutionary Position on the Chicano National Question, 1975.
- Selected speeches presented at forums by the August 29 Movement 1974–1975 : Marxist-Leninists unite!, 1976?.
- The Red Banner: The Theoretical Journal of the August Twenty-Ninth Movement (ML).
- Revolutionary Cause=Causa Revolucionaria. Newspaper.

== Sources ==
- Bill Gallegos: They Wanted to Serve the People
