= Lincoln Hospital (Bronx) =

- NYC Health + Hospitals

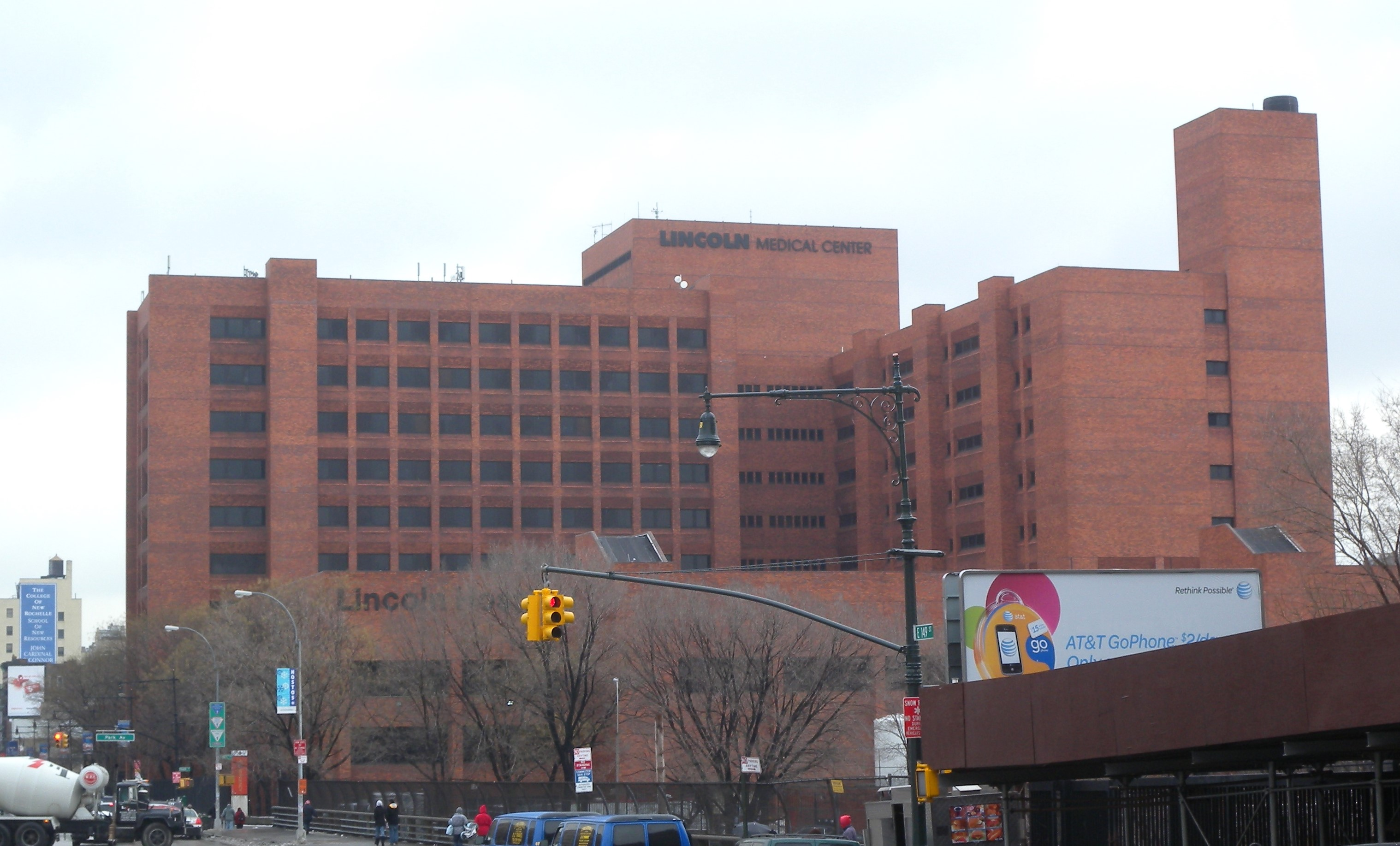
- View of the hospital from East 149th Street

Geography
- Location: 234 East 149th Street, The Bronx, New York, United States
- Coordinates: 40°49′N 73°55′W

Organization
- Type: Teaching
- Affiliated university: Weill Cornell Medical College; New York College of Podiatric Medicine
- Network: NYC Health + Hospitals

Services
- Emergency department: Level I trauma center
- Beds: 362

History
- Former names: The Home for the Colored Aged (1839); The Colored Home and Hospital (1882); Lincoln Hospital and Home (1902); Lincoln Medical and Mental Health Center
- Opened: 1839; 1898 (first Bronx campus); 1976 (second Bronx campus)

Links
- Website: nychhc.org/lincoln
- Lists: Hospitals in New York State
- Other links: Hospitals in The Bronx

Lincoln Hospital is a full service medical center and teaching hospital affiliated with Weill Cornell Medical College, in the Mott Haven neighborhood of the Bronx, New York City, New York. The medical center is municipally owned by NYC Health + Hospitals.

Lincoln is known for innovative programs addressing the specific needs of the community it serves, aggressively tackling such issues as asthma, obesity, cancer, diabetes and tuberculosis. Staffed by a team of more than 300 physicians, the hospital has an inpatient capacity of 347 beds, including 20 neonatal intensive care beds, 23 intensive care beds, 8 pediatric intensive care beds, 7 coronary care beds, and an 11-station renal dialysis unit. With over 144,000 emergency department visits annually, Lincoln has the busiest single-site emergency department in New York City and the third-busiest in the nation.

== History ==
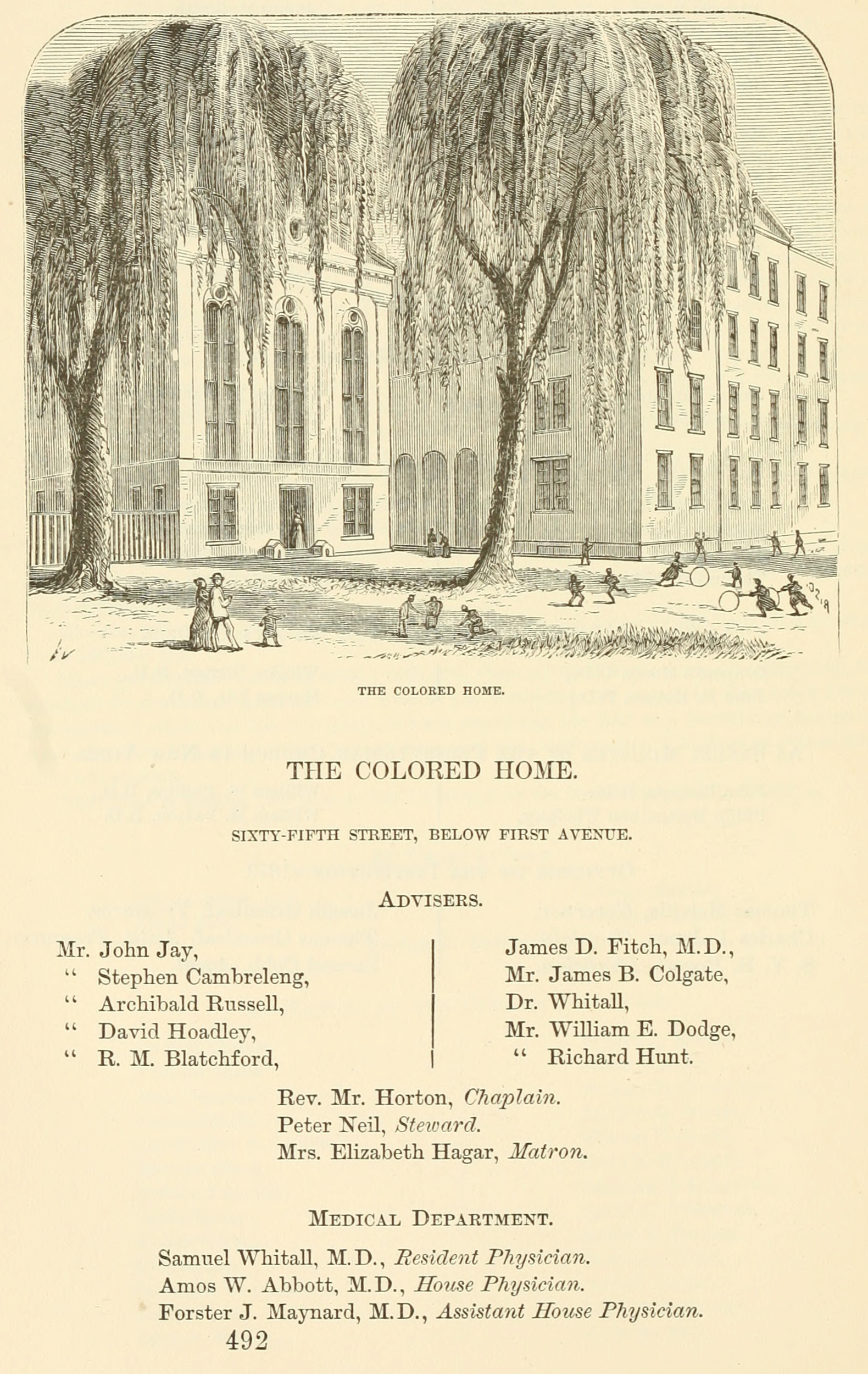
The Colored Home in New York City, Valentine's Manual (1870)

Lincoln Hospital was founded in 1839 as "The Home for the Colored Aged" by a group of prominent philanthropists known as the "Society for the Relief of Worthy Aged Indigent Colored Persons." The hospital's function gradually became the most important aspect of the operation, and in 1882, the name was changed to "The Colored Home and Hospital."

In 1895, after more than half a century of occupying various sites in Manhattan, the board of trustees purchased a large lot in the South Bronx (then a semi-rural area of the city) at the corner of 141st Street and Southern Boulevard. A new hospital was built; its facilities included the latest developments in medical care. The dedication took place on April 29, 1899. The hospital became a general hospital open to all people without regard to color or creed, although it maintained its founding connection as an institution dedicated to the relief and advancement of Black people. During the hospital's reorganization and eventual occupation of the new site, its name was changed to "Lincoln Hospital and Home", in honor of president Abraham Lincoln in 1902.

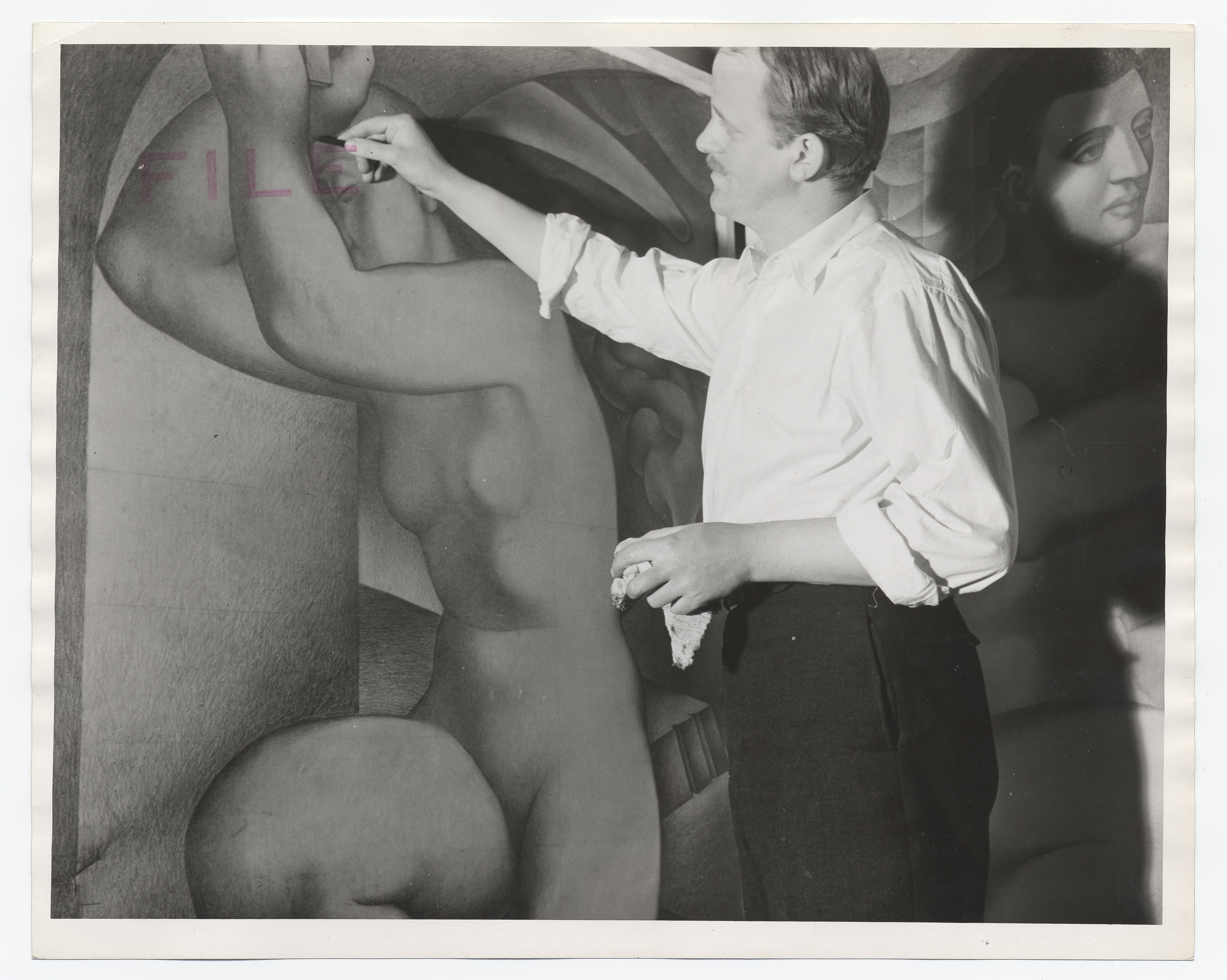
Eric Mose works on a Federal Art Project mural for the "Old Lincoln Hospital" in 1938

Because of the increasing demand for services required by a more densely populated South Bronx, and a decreasing supply of philanthropic funds, in 1925 the board of trustees decided to sell Lincoln Hospital to the Department of Public Welfare of the City of New York. The great outflow of physicians to the armed forces during World War II and the drastic socioeconomic decline in the area that followed took their toll on Lincoln Hospital. With the loss of jobs from industrial restructuring, new immigrants and migrants from mostly poor, rural areas of the southern regions of the United States, the Caribbean, and Latin America did not have the steady (but low skilled) labor opportunities of prior generations of immigrants. Their long-term standard of living was impacted.

The shift in population ushered in changes at Lincoln Hospital. In 1969, a 15-day takeover of the Department of Psychiatry by predominantly Black and Puerto Rican non-professional staff, marked Lincoln Hospital as a key figure in the birth of the community mental health movement. The occupiers criticized the paternalism of the white psychiatrists and challenged community mental health to be more than urban-serving institutions being dominated by well meaning elites who were neither sufficiently responsive to - nor aware of - the needs of poor urban patients.

=== Takeover of Lincoln hospital ===
The next year, on July 14, 1970, the Young Lords - a radical group of Puerto Rican activists - occupied Lincoln Hospital's administrative building to protest the city's indifference to the health needs of Puerto Rican and African American patients. They also protested the deplorable conditions of health care delivery at Lincoln Hospital and accused the medical schools (that were paid to provide hospital interns) of prioritizing the training medical students over patient care. The protest ended in the arrest of two Young Lords.

Several months later, in November 1970, the Young Lords and allies seized the Nurses’ Residence building at Lincoln Hospital and won use of Lincoln's anticipated drug-treatment funds; the use of space in the administrative building for a drug detox program and it was called Lincoln Detox; and the use of office space in the Psychiatry Department. Community control in the form of The People's Program was launched. Lincoln Hospital enjoyed a resurgence in the 1970s as one of the finest institutions for the care of the sick and the training of professionals in the newly formed New York City Health and Hospitals Corporation.

=== Current campus ===
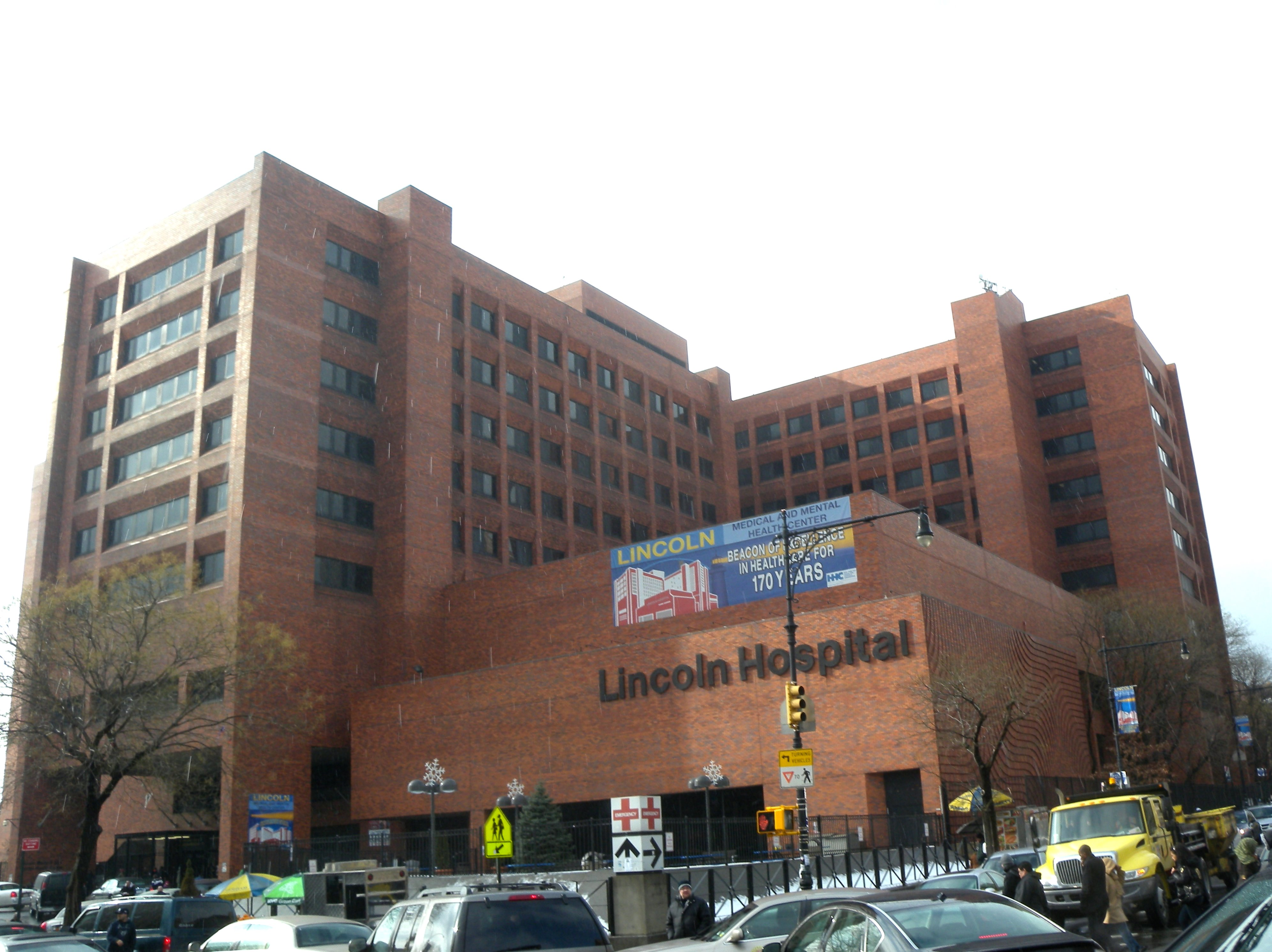
Lincoln Hospital's Main Entrance from Morris Avenue

In 1976, a new facility was dedicated about two miles from the "Old Lincoln," at a construction cost of 220 million dollars. The hospital building incorporates concepts in hospital design and equipment. It occupies five full city blocks, providing health care to the entire South Bronx community, as well as parts of Upper Manhattan. Lincoln also administers the Substance Abuse Division, located at 349 East 140th Street. Lincoln piloted the NYC HHC's CATCH program for early identification and treatment of substance use disorders.

In the 1990s, Lincoln became part of the North-Manhattan/South Bronx "Generations Plus Network" together with Metropolitan Hospital Center, Morrisania Diagnostic and Treatment Center, and Segundo Ruiz Belvis Diagnostic and Treatment Center.

As of 2007, Lincoln has a capacity of 347 beds. Although it constitutes 9% of the beds in the region, Lincoln caters to 31% of the health care visits of this community, where there is fewer than one primary care physician for every 4,000 people.

In 2014, the facility's Emergency Department reopened after undergoing a $24 million renovation and expansion project.

== Services ==
As the busiest single site Emergency Department in New York City, Lincoln Hospital is an Adult Level I Trauma Center and a Pediatric Level II Trauma Center. The New York State Department of Health selected Lincoln as the first hospital in the South Bronx to receive designation as an official Stroke Center. The medical center also houses FDNY EMS Battalion 14.

Residents of the South Bronx have the highest occurrence of asthma in New York City. Adult and pediatric asthma patients receive immediate attention from Lincoln's medical staff, set specifically aside in the Emergency Department's designated "Asthma Room". Adult patients are enrolled in Lincoln's Comprehensive Care for Patients with Asthma Clinic. The Lincoln Asthma and Allergy Clinic provides an individualized, multidisciplinary approach to asthma and allergy management.

Lincoln's specialty diabetes clinics include adult, pediatric, pregnancy and diabetes education programs, as well as recently receiving a grant from the United Hospital Fund to implement a new health literacy program for its diabetes clinic. Disease educators can be consulted around-the-clock and diabetes case management is available for pediatric patients.

Lincoln Medical and Mental Health Center received high quality ratings from the New York State Department of Health from hospital profiles comparing key quality measures and treatments for specific conditions in hospitals statewide. Lincoln ranked number two for appropriate care in New York State in the areas of heart attack and heart failure care, as well as surgical infection prevention, an HHC corporate initiative.

Some of Lincoln Medical and Mental Health Center's specialty services include: AIDS Center; Asthma Treatment; Diabetes Treatment; Level III Perinatal Center; Regional Trauma Center; Stroke Center; Women's Health Center; Child and Teen Health Services; SAFE (SART) Center.

Lincoln Hospital also hosts several residency training programs, including emergency medicine and internal medicine, as well as some fellowship training programs.

In 2025, Lincoln Hospital announced plans for a new program that will support people with opioid use disorder.

== Research and contributions ==
Lincoln Hospital's location has allowed access to a unique demographic of New York City's population, with some of the city's most ill, impoverished, and crime-impacted all concentrated in its surrounding neighborhoods. Currently, its Department of Graduate Medical Education oversees nine residency programs for training physicians and dentists in emergency medicine, general surgery, internal medicine, obstetrics and gynecology, pediatrics, oral maxillofacial surgery, general dentistry, a transitional year, and preliminary medicine programs. The hospital has contributed to the medical community in various fields of study, most notably in public health, infectious disease, trauma (medicine), and emergency medicine.

Ivatury et al. (1981) reported the value of immediate emergency department thoracotomy in a patient group of fatally penetrating trauma. Other studies have improved the diagnosis and management of gunshot wounds, rectal and genitourinary injuries, as well as "scoop and run" utility in prompt and emergency care in unstable patients.

More recent research has examined oxygen delivery in trauma patients, looking at biomarkers and physiological parameters such as organ-specific pHi monitoring., "damage-control surgery in life-threatening injuries, the importance of measuring intra-abdominal pressure, the concept of intraabdominal hypertension as a prelude to the morbid abdominal compartment syndrome, and pioneering "open-abdomen" management. The only text book on penetrating trauma was published from Lincoln. Other studies have challenged the utilization of accepted predictive markers such as vital signs, and serum lactic acid levels, in trying to employ the use of end-tidal carbon dioxide as a better diagnostic and prognostic marker in penetrating trauma patients.

Lincoln has also tackled many public health issues, such as helping recognize healthcare disparities among inner-city minority New Yorkers, as well as eliminating systemic barriers for preventative care measures in one of the nation's poorest census tracts. The hospital has also approached issues such as violence prevention, bullying, child abuse, and counseling and treatment of at-risk youth. Every year the hospital also holds the Lincoln Annual Research Symposium where over a hundred research projects are presented in competition. This event is judged by a panel of clinicians from the most major New York City hospitals, including Columbia University, Cornell University, and Montefiore Medical Center.

== See also ==
- Lincoln School for Nurses operated by the hospital 1898-1961
- Lincoln Detox
- 1970 takeover of the Lincoln Hospital
- 2015 New York Legionnaires' disease outbreak
- Weill Cornell Medical College
- NYC Health + Hospitals
