= Congress of Afrikan People =

1970s Black nationalist organization

- Founded: 1970
- Dissolved: 1980
- Preceded by: Committee for a Unified Newark
- Merged into: League of Revolutionary Struggle (Marxist-Leninist)
- Ideology: Black nationalism; Maoism
- Political position: Far-left

The founding 1970 Congress meeting had about 3,000 attendees.

The Congress of Afrikan People (CAP) was a Black nationalist and Maoist organization in the United States from 1970 to 1980.

CAP was founded in 1970. CAP's activities illustrate the fluidity and changing nature of black radicalism in this period.

In 1974, CAP became the Revolutionary Communist League (Marxist-Leninist-Mao Tse-tung Thought), led by Amiri Baraka. In 1980, the RCL merged into the League of Revolutionary Struggle (Marxist-Leninist). When this group split, some former CAP members joined the Freedom Road Socialist Organization.
