= I Wor Kuen =

Asian-American Marxist group

- 義和拳
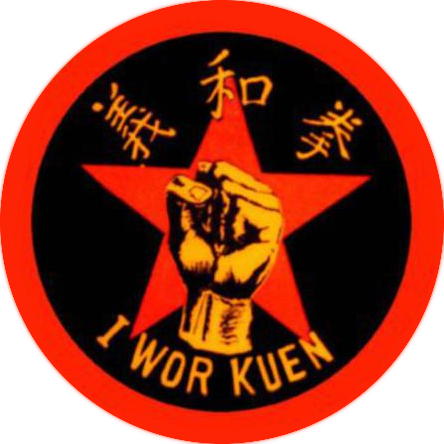
- Named after: Boxer Rebellion (I Wor Kuen/Yihequan)
- Merged into: League of Revolutionary Struggle
- Formation: late 1969; 57 years ago
- Founded at: Columbia University
- Dissolved: 1978; 48 years ago
- Location: New York City Chinatown

I Wor Kuen
- Traditional Chinese: 義和拳
- Simplified Chinese: 义和拳
- Literal meaning: Righteous and Harmonious Fists
Transcriptions
Standard Mandarin
- Hanyu Pinyin: Yìhé Quán
Yue: Cantonese
- Yale Romanization: Yih-wò Kyuhn
- Jyutping: ji6 wo4 kyun4
- IPA: [ji˨ wɔ˩ kʰyn˩]

I Wor Kuen (Chinese: 義和拳; Jyutping: ji6 wo4 kyun4) was a radical Marxist Asian American collective that originally formed in 1969 in New York City's Chinatown. Borrowing from the ideologies of the Young Lords and the Black Panthers, IWK organized several community programs and produced a newsletter series promoting self-determination for Asian Americans. Initially consisting of students from Columbia University, the group worked in conjunction with residents of New York City's Chinatown to address the community's needs for healthcare reform, draft counseling, and childcare. The group expanded nationally with the Red Guard Party in San Francisco in 1972 to create a national organization.

== History ==
The organization established itself in New York's Chinatown in late 1969 and is named after the peasant group that fought against foreign intrusion and influence in China in 1898 during the beginning of the Boxer Rebellion, which officially began in 1900. Translated to "Righteous and Harmonious Fists," it was established by a group of young people and students who participated in the Triple A and Columbia's AAPA, and eventually other radical Chinese nationals (Wei 212-3). Inspired by their namesake from the Chinese Boxer Rebellion and with Mao Zedong, the members were heavy proponents for self-determination and community service on varying levels.

Within New York City, it worked predominantly around issues affecting the immediate Manhattan Chinatown. They protested the tourist buses that came into the community; participated in a "housing crimes trial" forum at Columbia University with Metropolitan Council on Housing, Black Panthers, Young Lords, City Wide Coordinating Committee of Welfare Rights Groups, Social Service Employees Union; hosted free movie screenings about the People's Republic of China; organized the first Chinatown Health Fair in 1971 with other organizations in the neighborhood as a reaction against the Chinese Consolidated Benevolent Association's neglect to the community and worked on demonstrations to raise awareness on how to avoid the draft. It also organized school programs.

In March 1970, I Work Kuen began a door-to-door tuberculosis testing program in New York City's Chinatown. At the time, there were no hospital facilities in Chinatown.

In addition to their public organizing, it was also known for the nationally distributed and bilingual newspaper, Getting Together (Chinese: 团結報). It focused on "national liberation struggles around the world but paid particular attention to the People's Republic of China ... [and] the oppressive conditions in Chinatown." By pushing out a publication such as Getting Together, IWK believed that they would be able to share their particular observations and stories of oppression to the rest of the nation.

Eventually, it spread out nationally towards the Bay Area, joining forces with the Red Guards (a similar organization based in San Francisco). The group was also generally persecuted by more conservative groups within the Chinese and Asian American community, like the CCBA, who denounced IWK's revolutionary activities as being disruptive to Chinatown (Wei 215). They were also under FBI surveillance when they began to use the Chinese Progressive Association as a means of public recruitment.

In 1978, I Wor Kuen and the Chicano Marxist–Leninist organization August 29th Movement were both dissolved and the new organization the League of Revolutionary Struggle was founded.
