= Revolutionary Workers League =

Revolutionary Workers League may refer to:

- Revolutionary Workers League/Ligue Ouvrière Révolutionnaire, a Canadian Trotskyist group
- Revolutionary Workers League (in Manitoba)
- Revolutionary Workers League (Oehlerite), a U.S. group that existed in the 1930s, founded by Hugo Oehler
- Revolutionary Workers League (U.S., 1976), a U.S. Trotskyist group founded in 1976
- Revolutionary Workers League (Britain), a British group in the late 1930s
- Revolutionary Workers League (New Zealand)

== See also ==
- Workers Revolutionary League
