= Student Organization for Black Unity =

The Student Organization for Black Unity was a group of African American students in North Carolina, United States led by Marxist thinker Nelson Johnson. Centered in Greensboro, it was formed in 1969, originally to stop the forced integration of black schools with white students so as to provide an educational environment for black students in which they would not be made to feel inferior to white people. The organization was an extension of the Black Power movement. The organization later extended its mandate, and advocated for the civil rights of all the people in the black community, at which point its name was changed to the Youth Organization for Black Unity by Roderick D. Bush.

The Black sit-in movement was launched nationally in North Carolina by four N.C. A&T students on February 1, 1960. During the early 60’s there were massive protest marches of students and the larger Black community. In 1968 and 1969 there were violent rebellions with pitched gun battles between Black high school and college students and the police. In the early 70’s the Student Organization for Black Unity (SOBU), later Youth Organization for Black Unity (YOBU) had been headquartered in Greensboro and had a base among Black students across the state. In 1972, YOBU had organized a “Save Black School” campaign that had mobilized nearly five thousand Black students at a demonstration at the State Capital in Raleigh.

Nelson Johnson who was chairman of YOBU along with other YOBU activists had played a key role in organizing Black community organizations that led rent strikes, Black worker struggles, and other protest well into the 1970’s.

== Origins ==
Throughout North Carolina, under the Jim Crow laws, black colleges, including North Carolina A&T State University and Bennett College, were created to provide an education to blacks that white colleges wouldn't accept. In the 1970s, in the wake of the Civil Rights Movement, there was a move to integrate people of other races into these schools. A student group named the Student Organization for Black Unity was created to advocate for the maintenance of the schools as black-only institutions and to promote a feeling of community and racial self-esteem among the students. The members of the organization believed that integrating the schools would lead to a decline in the quality of educational opportunities for black students, through rising admissions standards and through the replacement of black administrators and instructors.

== The founder ==
Nelson Johnson was a Marxist who advocated for either complete equality for the races or complete separation of the races, both with equal resources. He was deeply involved in the civil rights movement and the Black Power movement. He was part of the Youth Educational Services and then later the Greensboro Association for Poor People. Johnson had used tactics such as confrontation and intimidation to promote his causes. Johnson founded the Student Organization for Black Unity in May 1969.

== Activism ==
The SOBU channeled its activist energy mainly into improving communities on the grassroots level, rather than in protesting against perceived injustice, and in this way gained support in the larger community. In the early 1970s, they published The African World (originally called the SOBU Newsletter).

At times, though, they did take a more active role in the Black Power movement. In response to impending desegregation, members of the SOBU participated in the take-over and sit-in of the Allen Building on Duke University's campus. About sixty students were involved. The organization also organized a "black week" to publicize their cause, and to promote a sense of pride in the students' African heritage.

Members of SOBU also authored a report for the United Nations. As time went on, the organization, now YOBU, became more Marxist and nationalist. When the organization later disbanded, many of its leaders joined the Communist Workers Party.
