= Sid Davidoff =

American lawyer (1939–2025)

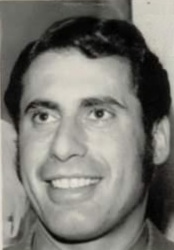
- Davidoff in 1973

Senior Advisor to the Mayor of New York City
- In office 1966–1973
- Mayor: John Lindsay

Personal details
- Born: July 18, 1939 New York City, U.S.
- Died: November 16, 2025 (aged 86) Punta Cana, La Altagracia, Dominican Republic
- Spouses: Patricia Miller (divorced); Bonnie Mandina (divorced); Linda Stasi (m. 2014)
- Education: City College of New York (BA); New York University (J.D.)
- Occupation: Lawyer

Sidney H. Davidoff (July 18, 1939 – November 16, 2025) was an American lawyer and advisor who was one of 20 people on Richard Nixon's enemies list. Davidoff served as administrative assistant to John Lindsay, mayor of New York City, for seven years. After serving as his assistant, Davidoff founded his own firm and worked as a lawyer until his death.

== Early life and education ==
Sidney H. Davidoff was born in New York City on July 18, 1939. (Note: While a 1967 article in The New York Times states Davidoff was born in Queens, a 2004 directory states he was born in Brooklyn. Davidoff's obituary in the Times also lists Brooklyn.) His middle initial was not short for anything. He was brought up in the Queens neighborhood of Middle Village, and attended Jamaica High School where he was a wrestler. His father, a Jewish immigrant who came to the United States from Russia, owned a candy store. Davidoff graduated with a bachelor's degree from City College of New York in 1960 and earned his J.D. from New York University in 1963. He was admitted to the New York Bar that year.

== Career ==
Davidoff was administrative assistant to New York City Mayor John Lindsay for seven years, from 1966 to 1972, having worked on both his 1965 and 1969 campaigns. Hendrik Hertzberg called him "the Mayor's burly troubleshooter". During unrest in New York City following the Assassination of Martin Luther King Jr., Davidoff was among the mayoral aides working on the administration's response. He served on the board of governors of The New York Young Republican Club from 1967 to 1968.

In 1968, when students took over Hamilton Hall at Columbia University and held dean Henry S. Coleman captive, Lindsay sent Davidoff as one of the mediators to broker the dean's release.

Davidoff appeared as No. 12 on Richard Nixon's enemies list, which described him as "Lindsay's top personal aide: a first class S.O.B., wheeler-dealer and suspected bagman. Positive results would really shake the Lindsay camp and Lindsay's plans to capture youth vote. Davidoff in charge."

Davidoff worked on Lindsay's unsuccessful campaign in the 1972 Democratic Party presidential primaries.

In September 1972, after his time as an administrative assistant for Lindsay, Davidoff and Richard R. Aurelio, Lindsay's deputy mayor, opened a nightclub and restaurant on Manhattan's West 52nd Street called "Jimmy's", named for journalist Jimmy Breslin. A year after "Jimmy's" was closed, Davidoff was indicted in 1976 for alleged state tax law violations.

Until his death, Davidoff was a senior partner at the lobbying firm Davidoff Hutcher & Citron LLP, which he founded in 1975. He later went on to form the New York Advocacy Association, a "lobbying group for lobbyists", designed to counter strict and complicated lobbying laws in the State of New York.

Davidoff was a Chubb Fellow at Yale University, as well as a lecturer to the Root-Tilden students at New York University School of Law. He also taught several political science classes at City College of New York, his alma mater.

Davidoff also had roles in television shows, including the ABC comedy Spin City, and HBO crime series The Sopranos.

== Personal life and death ==
Davidoff’s first two marriages, to Patricia Miller and Bonnie Mandina, ended in divorce. Davidoff married journalist Linda Stasi in 2014. He divided his time between residences on the Upper East Side of Manhattan and in Punta Cana, Dominican Republic. He died in hospital in Punta Cana, on November 16, 2025, at the age of 86, due to an infection while recovering from shoulder surgery.
