= Iris Morales =

Latinx and feminist activist

Iris Morales (born 1948) is an American activist for Latino/a civil rights, filmmaker, author, and lawyer based in New York. She is best known for her work with the Young Lords, a Puerto Rican community activist group in the United States and her feminist movements within the organization.

== Early life and education ==
Iris Morales was born in New York in 1948 to Puerto Rican migrant parents. Her father worked as a hotel elevator operator, and her mother worked as a sewing machine operator. She went to Julia Richman High School, where she attended meetings of the Student Nonviolent Coordinating Committee and the NAACP.

In high school, Morales was highly inspired by Malcolm X and Don Pedro Albizu Campos, because there was little understood about Puerto Rican history. This, along social movements such as the Black Panther Party, inspired Morales to become an activist. As a teenager, she became a tenant rights organizer in her East Harlem neighborhood and protested the Vietnam War. She studied political science at City College, where she joined the Black student organization and co-founded Puerto Ricans Involved in Student Action (PRISA), the school's first Puerto Rican student organization.

== The Young Lords ==
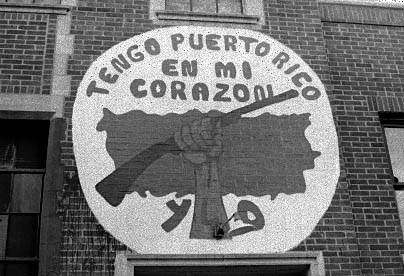
The Young Lords logo.

The Chicago-based Young Lords, a leftist group of Puerto Rican youth activists inspired by the Black Panthers, established a branch in New York in 1969. Morales joined the group that year, after meeting Young Lords founder José Cha Cha Jiménez at a conference in Denver.

Her work as a leader in the Young Lords spanned five years in the 1960s and 1970s. She served as deputy minister of education and co-founder of its Women's Caucus. Morales served as minister of information for a period. Morales resigned from the Young Lords, which was struggling with infighting and targeted by the FBI's COINTELPRO program, in 1975. The party effectively disbanded the following year.

=== Feminist movement ===
Morales worked to create a second revolution within The Young Lord's Party, seeking to deconstruct the patriarchal sexism that followed women at the beginning of their journey in the Young Lords Party.

She along with other women of the Young Lords party disputed the machista values outlined in the 13-point program written and published by the Young Lords male members that ultimately supported machista views, pointing out the duality of their statements to that of the initiatives of The Young Lords Party.

Morales worked on political education and literacy efforts, as well as attempting to change the machista culture of the organization. She advocated for women's inclusion in leadership and helped co-found the Women's Union and its corresponding publication, La Luchadora. Her work on women's representation in the Young Lords paved the way for the organization's pioneering lesbian and gay caucus. On November 11, 1970, Iris Morales along with Denise Oliver, Nydia Mercado, and Lulu Carreras, were highlighted an article in The New York Times. This feature was the first documentation and acknowledgment of women's involvement in the movement in the mainstream media.

In addition to her fight for the feminist cause within the Young Lords, she also used her position in the organization to advocate for abortion access and against forced sterilizations, and an increase to birth control accessibility. The women's caucus continued to advocate for safer abortions for women of underrepresented backgrounds. Among the causes that the organization undertook during this period included establishing a free breakfast program for New York's youth, creating a lead poisoning prevention program, founding a daycare so Latina women could seek employment, and advocating for the decolonization of Puerto Rico.

==== La Luchadora ====
La Luchadora was a 12-point program that was written and co-founded by Iris Morales. The paper was an act to promote the history of women and their rights within the Young Lords Party at a time when women were rarely highlighted. La Luchadora contested against rape and violence that existed within and outside of the organization. The women's caucus used this platform as a way to remove themselves from the traditional roles of women in the kitchen, and ascend into positions of action. The program was discontinued by the Young Lords' leadership soon after its creation in May 1971.

== Further education and career ==
After the dissolution of the Young Lords, Morales continued her Latina feminist activism and pursued a Juris Doctor degree from New York University School of Law. At NYU, she became the first Puerto Rican to receive the highly competitive Root-Tilden-Kern Scholarship, a full-tuition public service scholarship.

As a lawyer, she worked as an attorney and director of education at the Puerto Rican Legal Defense and Education Fund. She was also a co-founder and the executive director of the New Educational Opportunities Network, a media nonprofit serving young people of color, which was defunded after five years. She later worked with Manhattan Neighborhood Network's community media center in Spanish Harlem and served as director of the Union Square Awards, a city government project recognizing grassroots activists.

Morales returned to school again and earned an MFA in Integrated Media Arts from Hunter College.

=== Writing ===
Morales continued her activism through literature, founding Red Sugarcane Press to publish works relating to the Latinx community.

Morales wrote Through The Eyes Of Rebel Women, The Young Lords: 1969-1976, a book that focuses on her experiences in the feminist movement within the Young Lords Party. The book was published through Red Sugarcane Press, Morales' personal small publishing house, in 2016. This project allowed Morales reflect on the experiences of being a part of the party, both the pleasant and unpleasant ones alike. Morales' intentions for her book are that many are not only able to learn about the history of The Young Lords women but continue to learn lessons that continue to be applicable to the modern activist movements.

Her other works include the anthologies Latinas: Struggles & Protests in 21st Century and Voices From Puerto Rico: Post-Hurricane Maria/ Voces desde Puerto Rico. She also published a children's book, Vicki and A Summer of Change! ¡Vicki y un verano de cambio!, with co-author Raquel M. Ortiz. The story focuses on the main character, Vicki, who is determined to make a change in her community by joining the Young Lord's Party and serving her community.

Morales has contributed to recent scholarship on the history of the Young Lords, writing forwards for The Young Lords: A Reader in 2010 and Palante: Young Lords Party in 2011.

=== Filmmaking ===
In 1996, Morales directed the documentary Palante Siempre Palante to educate new audiences about the Young Lords Party.

Morales appeared in the 2021 New York Times documentary Takeover: How We Occupied a Hospital and Changed Public Health Care, about the 1970 Lincoln Hospital takeover through which the Young Lords requested proper funding and infrastructure to respond to overwhelming health care needs, a local tuberculosis epidemic, and other issues.

== Recognition ==
In 2019 Iris Morales was named one of North Star Fund's 40 for 40.

In 2020, she was honored as a Latina Trailblazer by LatinoJustice PRLDEF.
