= List of parks in Chicago =

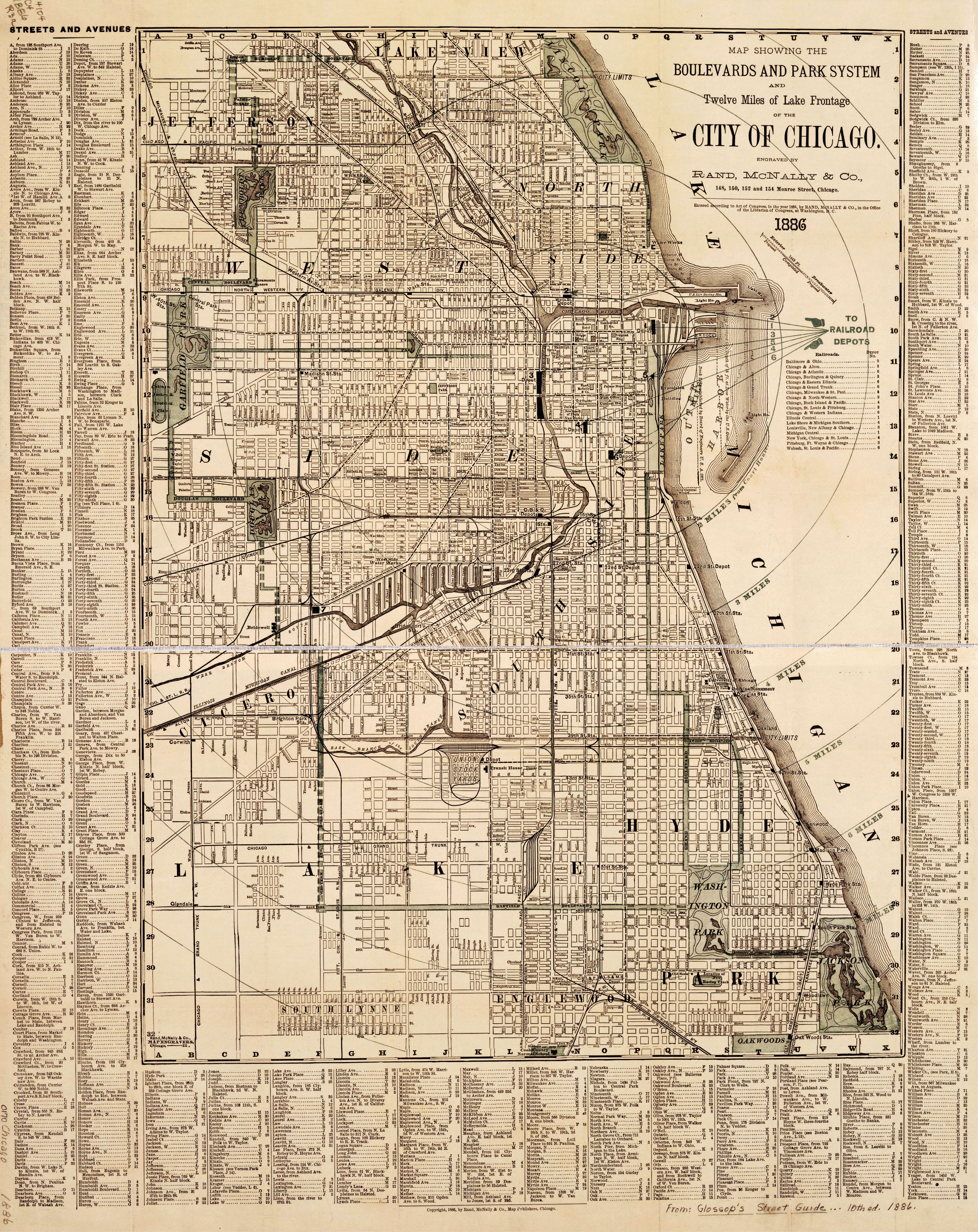
1886 map of parks in Chicago

This is a list of parks in Chicago. There are over 600 parks in the city, covering 8.2% of its total land acreage. Most of Chicago's city parks are administered by the Chicago Park District.

== Notable city parks ==
Name	Image	Location	Size	Notes
Burnham Park			598 acres (242 ha)	Runs along the Lakefront for much of the South Side, connecting Jackson Park with Grant Park
Calumet Park			200 acres (81 ha)	Shares a border with the State of Indiana; located on the lake
Columbus Park			144 acres (58 ha)	Considered one of the 150 Great Places in Illinois
Douglass Park			173 acres (70 ha)	Named after Anna and Frederick Douglass; southwest of downtown
Garfield Park			185 acres (75 ha)	This west side park contains a grand conservatory and lagoon
Grant Park			319 acres (129 ha)	Located downtown in the Loop; home to Buckingham Fountain; a favorite site of major festivals including the Taste of Chicago, Chicago Blues Festival, Chicago Jazz Festival, and Lollapolooza
Humboldt Park			207 acres (84 ha)	A cultural center of Chicago's Puerto Rican community; the site of a famous rally by pianist and statesman Ignace Paderewski that led to Poland regaining its independence after the First World War
Jackson Park		Hyde Park, Woodlawn, South Shore	551 acres (223 ha)	Located on the shore of Lake Michigan, famous for its role in the 1893 World's Columbian Exposition
Lincoln Park		Lincoln Park	1,188 acres (481 ha)	Chicago's largest city park. Located north of the Loop, this is one of the more distinctive parks in terms of geography, because while it is centrally located in the Lincoln Park community area, it spans many different neighborhoods on the north side.
Marquette Park		Chicago Lawn	315 acres (127 ha)	The largest park in southwest Chicago; has a golf course and many other attractions
Millennium Park		Chicago Loop	24.5 acres (9.9 ha)	Chicago's newest marquee park, opened in 2004, just north of the Art Institute of Chicago in Grant Park, operated by the Chicago Department of Cultural Affairs
Washington Park		Washington Park	346 acres (140 ha)	Located on the south side; contains the DuSable Museum of African American History and the Lorado Taft sculpture Fountain of Time

== Full list of Chicago parks ==
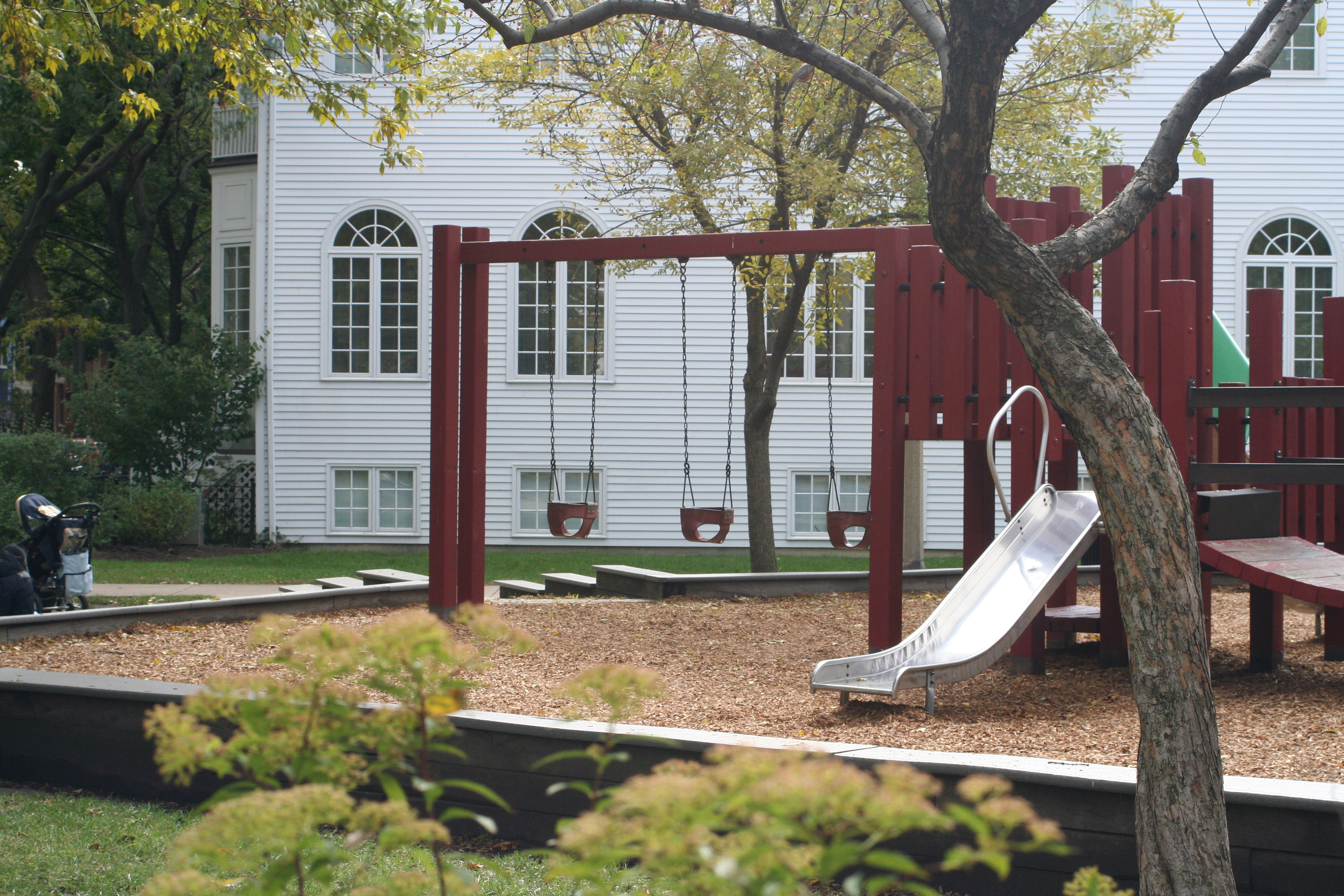
Swings in Bauler Park, Chicago

Name (namesake)	Address	Notes
Abbott (Robert) Park	49 E 95th St, Chicago, IL 60619	
Ada (Sawyer Garrett) Park	11250 S Ada St, Chicago, IL 60643	
Adams (John C.) Park	7535 S. Dobson Ave. Chicago, IL 60619	
George & Adele Adams Park	1919 N. Seminary Ave. Chicago, IL 60614	
Addams (Jane) Memorial Park	550 E. Grand Ave. Chicago, IL 60611	
Addams (Jane) Park	1434 S. Loomis Chicago, IL 60608	
Aiello (John) Park	2133 N. McVicker Ave. Chicago, IL 60602	
Algonquin Park	2941 N. Washtenaw Ave. Chicago, IL 60618	
Almond Park	2234 W. 115th St. Chicago, IL 60643	
Altgeld (John) Park	515 S. Washtenaw Ave. Chicago, IL 60612	
Amundsen (Roald) Park	6200 W. Bloomingdale Ave. Chicago, IL 60639	
Anderson (Fred) Park	1611 S. Wabash Ave. Chicago, IL 60616	
Anderson (Louis) Park	3748 South Prairie Avenue Chicago, IL 60653	
Andersonville Park	5233 N. Ashland Ave. Chicago, IL 60640	
Arcade Park	11132 S. St. Lawrence Ave. Chicago, IL 60628	
Archer (William Beatty) Park	4901 S. Kilbourn Ave. Chicago, IL 60632	
Armour (Philip) Square Park	3309 S. Shields Ave. Chicago, IL 60616	
Armstrong (Lillian Hardin) Park	4433 S. St. Lawrence Ave. Chicago, IL 60653	
Arrigo (Victor) Park	801 S. Loomis St. Chicago, IL 60607	
Ashe (Arthur) Beach Park	2701 E. 74th St. Chicago, IL 60649	
Ashmore Park	4807 W. Gunnison St. Chicago, IL 60630	
Aspen Park	4237 S. Wabash Ave. Chicago, IL 60653	
Aster Park	4639 N. Kenmore Ave. Chicago, IL 60640	
Athletic Field Park	3546 W. Addison St. Chicago, IL 60618	
Auburn Park	406 W. Winneconna Pkwy. Chicago, IL 60620	
Augusta (Carpenter) Park	4433 W. Augusta Blvd. Chicago, IL 60651	
Austin Foster Park	6020 W. Foster Ave. Chicago, IL 60630	
Austin (Henry) Park	5951 W. Lake St. Chicago, IL 60644	
Austin Town Hall Park	5610 W. Lake St. Chicago, IL 60644	
Avalon Park	1215 E. 83rd St. Chicago, IL 60619	
Avondale Park	3516 W. School St. Chicago, IL 60618	
Back of the Yards Park	4922 S. Throop St. Chicago, IL 60609	
Baraga (Frederick) Park	2434 S. Leavitt St. Chicago, IL 60608	
Barberry Park	2825 W. Arthington St. Chicago, IL 60612	
Barnard (Amy L.) Park	10431 S. Longwood Dr. Chicago, IL 60643	
Barrett (Charles) Park	2022 W. Cermak Rd. Chicago, IL 60608	
Bartelme (Mary) Park	115 S. Sangamon St. Chicago, IL 60607	
Battle of Fort Dearborn Park	1801 S. Calumet Ave. Chicago, IL 60616	
Bauler (Mathias) Park	501 W. Wisconsin St. Chicago, IL 60614	
Beehive Park	6156 S. Dearborn Ave. Chicago, IL 60637	
Beilfuss (Albert W.) Park	1725 N. Springfield Ave. Chicago, IL 60647	
Bell (George, Jr.) Park	3020 N. Oak Park Ave. Chicago, IL 60634	
Beniac (John "Beans") Greenway Park	3925 E. 104th St. Chicago, IL 60617	
Bennett Park	456 E Illinois St, Chicago, IL 60611	
Berger (Albert) Park	6205 N. Sheridan Rd. Chicago, IL 60660	
Bessemer (Henry) Park	8930 S. Muskegon Ave. Chicago, IL 60617	
Beverly Park	2460 W. 102nd St. Chicago, IL 60655	
Bickerdike (George) Square Park	1461 W. Ohio St. Chicago, IL 60642	
Big Marsh Park	11559 S. Stony Island Ave. Chicago, IL 60617	
Birch Park	425 E. 45th St. Chicago, IL 60653	
Bixler (Ray) Park	5641 S. Kenwood Ave. Chicago, IL 60637	
Blackhawk Park	2318 N. Lavergne Ave. Chicago, IL 60639	
Blackwelder (Gertrude) Park	11500 S. Homewood Ave. Chicago, IL 60643	
Block (Eugene H.) Park	346 W. 104th St. Chicago, IL 60628	
Bloomingdale Trail Park	1600-3750 W. Bloomingdale Ave. Chicago, IL 60647	Previously Park No. 572 It is the longest greenway project of a former elevated rail line in the Western Hemisphere, and the second longest in the world.
Bogan (William) Park	3939 W. 79th St. Chicago, IL 60652	
Bohn (Henry) Park	1966 W. 111th St. Chicago, IL 60643	
Boler (Leo Roscoe, Sr.) Park	3601 W. Arthington St. Chicago, IL 60624	
Bosley (William) Park	3044 S. Bonfield St. Chicago, IL 60608	
Boswell (Arnita Young) Park	6644 S. University Ave. Chicago, IL 60637	
Bradley (Josephine) Park	9729 S.Yates Ave. Chicago, IL 60617	
Brainerd Park	1246 W. 92nd St. Chicago, IL 60620	
Brands Park	3285 N. Elston Ave. Chicago, IL 60618	
Brighton Park	3501 S. Richmond St. Chicago, IL 60632	
Broadway Armory Park	5917 N. Broadway Chicago, IL 60660	
Bromann (Charles) Park	5400 N. Broadway Chicago, IL 60640	
Broncho Billy Park	4437 N. Magnolia Ave. Chicago, IL 60640	
Brooks (Gwendolyn) Park	4542 S. Greenwood Ave. Chicago, IL 60653	
Brooks (Oscar) Park	7100 N. Harlem Ave. Chicago, IL 60631	
Brown (Sidney) Memorial Park	634 E. 86th St. Chicago, IL 60619	
Brynford Park	5636 N. Pulaski Rd. Chicago, IL 60646	
Buena Circle Park	1049 W. Buena Ave. Chicago, IL 60613	
Buffalo Park	4501 N. California Ave. Chicago, IL 60625	
Burnham (Daniel) Park	1200-5700 S. Jean-Baptiste Pointe DuSable Lake Shore Drive Chicago, IL 60615	
Burnside (Ambrose) Park	9400 S. Greenwood Ave. Chicago, IL 60619	
Buttercup Park	4901 N. Sheridan Rd. Chicago, IL 60640	
Butternut Park	5324 S. Woodlawn Ave. Chicago, IL 60615	
Byrnes (Marian R.) Park	2200 E. 103rd St. Chicago, IL 60617	
Byrne (Jane M.) Plaza Park	180 E. Pearson St, Chicago, IL 60611	It is adjacent to the Chicago Water Tower along Michigan Avenue.
California Park	3843 N. California Ave. Chicago, IL 60618	
Calumet Park	9801 S. Avenue G Chicago, IL 60617	200 acres (81 ha)
Canal Origins Park	2701 S. Ashland Ave. Chicago, IL 60608	
Canalport Riverwalk Park	2900 S. Ashland Ave. Chicago, IL 60608	
Carmen Park	1224 W. Carmen Ave. Chicago, IL 60640	
Carpenter (Philo) Park	6153 S. Carpenter St. Chicago, IL 60621	
Carver (George Washington) Park	939 E. 132nd St. Chicago, IL 60827	
Cedar Park	5311 N. Winthrop Ave. Chicago, IL 60640	
Centennial Park	6068 N. Northwest Highway Chicago, IL 60631	
Central Park	721 N. Central Park Ave. Chicago, IL 60624	
Challenger Park	1100 W. Irving Park Rd. Chicago, IL 60613	
Chamberlain Triangle Park	4227 S. Greenwood Ave. Chicago, IL 60653	
Chase (Salmon) Park	4701 N. Ashland Ave. Chicago, IL 60640	
Chestnut Park	7001 S. Dante Ave. Chicago, IL 60611	
Chicago Women's Park and Gardens	1801 S. Indiana Ave. Chicago, IL 60616	
Chippewa Park	6748 N. Sacramento Ave. Chicago, IL 60645	
Chopin (Frederic) Park	3420 N. Long Ave. Chicago, IL 60641	
Christiana Park	1533 S. Christiana Ave. Chicago, IL 60623	
Churchill Field Park	1825 N. Damen Ave. Chicago, IL 60614	
Claremont Park	2334 W. Flournoy St. Chicago, IL 60612	
Clarendon Community Center Park	4501 N. Clarendon Ave. Chicago, IL 60640	
Clark (John) Park	4615 W. Jackson Blvd. Chicago, IL 60644	
Clark (Richard) Park	3400 N. Rockwell St. Chicago, IL 60618	
Clover Park	2210 N. Southport Ave. Chicago, IL 60614	
Clybourn (Archibald) Park	1755 N. Clybourn Ave. Chicago, IL 60614	
Cochran (John) Park	5550 N. Magnolia Ave. Chicago, IL 60640	
Cole (Nat King) Park	361 E. 85th St. Chicago, IL 60619	
Coleman (Bessie) Park	5445 S. Drexel Ave. Chicago, IL 60615	
Coliseum Park	1466 S. Wabash Ave. Chicago, IL 60605	
Cornell (Paul) Park	5473 S. Cornell Ave. Chicago, IL 60615	
Cornell (Paul) Square Park	1809 W. 50th St. Chicago, IL 60609	
Cosme (Margaret) Park	9201 S. Longwood Dr. Chicago, IL 60620	
Cotton Tail Park	44 W. 15th St. Chicago, IL 60616	
Cottonwood Park	5058 W. West End Ave. Chicago, IL 60644	
Columbus (Christopher) Park	500 S. Central Ave. Chicago, IL 60644	
Commercial Club Playground of Chicago	1845 W. Rice St. Chicago, IL 60622	
Connors (William) Park	861 N. Wabash Ave. Chicago, IL 60611	
Cooper (Jack) Park	11712 S. Ada Street Chicago, IL 60643	
Oscar O. D'Angelo Park		also known as Wacker Gateway Park
Debow Park		
Dickinson Park		
Lorraine L. Dixon Park		
Donahue (Margaret) Park	1230 W. School St. Chicago, IL 60657	0.54 acres (0.22 ha)
Donovan Park		
Douglass Park		
Dubkin (Leonard) Park	7442 N. Ashland Ave. Chicago, IL 60626	
Dunbar Park		
Durkin Park		
DuSable Park		
Dvorak Park		
Eckhart Park		
Edgebrook Park		
Edison Park		
Ellis Park		
Eugene Field Park		
Fargo (James) Beach Park	1300 W. Fargo Ave. Chicago, IL 60626	
Fellger Park	2000 W. Belmont Ave. Chicago, IL 60618	
Fernwood Park		
Forest Glen Park		
Foster Park		
Fuller Park		
Gage Park		
Garfield Park		
Gladstone (William) Park	5421 N. Menard Ave. Chicago, IL 60630	
Gompers Park		
Gooseberry Park	4648 N. Malden Ave. Chicago, IL 60640	
Goudy Square Park		
Grand Park		
Grant Park		
Green Briar Park	2650 W. Peterson Ave. Chicago, IL 60659	
Gross Park		
Hamilton Park		
Hamlin Park	3035 N. Hoyne Ave. Chicago, IL 60618	
Howard (Ure) Beach Park	7519 N. Eastlake Terrace Chicago, IL 60626	
Jonquil Park	1001 W. Wrightwood Ave. Chicago, IL 60614	
Juniper Park		
Lorraine Hansberry Park		
Hanson Park		
Ryan Harris Memorial Park		
Harrison Park		
Hiawatha Park	8029 W. Forest Preserve Ave. Chicago, IL 60634	
Vivian Gordon Hash Park		
Hayes Park		
Hodes Park		
Hollywood Park	3312 W. Thorndale Ave. Chicago, IL 60659	
Holstein Park		
Houston Park		
Horner (Henry) Park	2741 W. Montrose Ave. Chicago, IL 60618	
Hoyne Park		
Humboldt Park		
Independence Park		
Indian Boundary Park	2500 W. Lunt Ave. Chicago, IL 60645	
Indian Road Park	6010 W. Matson Ave. Chicago, IL 60646	
Jackson (Mahalia) Park	8385 S. Birkhoff Ave Chicago, IL 60620	
Jackson (Andrew) Park	6401 S. Stony Island Ave. Chicago, IL 60637	
Jefferson (Nancy) Park	3101 W. Fulton St. Chicago, IL 60612	
Jefferson (Thomas) Memorial Park	4822 N. Long Ave. Chicago, IL 60630	
Jones (Mary Richardson) Park	1240 S. Plymouth Ct. Chicago, IL 60616	named after activist Mary Jane Richardson Jones
Jonquil Park	1001 W. Wrightwood Ave. Chicago, IL 60614	
Juneway Beach Park	7751 N. Eastlake Terrace Chicago, IL 60626	
Kelvyn Park		
Kenmore Park	3141 N. Kenmore Ave. Chicago, IL 60657	
Kennedy Park Playground		features four baseball diamonds, a swimming pool, playground, roller rink, and spray pool
Kenwood Community Park		formerly Shoesmith Field
King Park and Family Entertainment Center		
Kosciuszko Park		
Kujawa (Chester Frank) Park	4330 S. Kedvale Ave. Chicago, IL 60632	
La Follette Park (Chicago)		
Lincoln Park		
La Villita Park		
Lake Shore Park	808 N. Lake Shore Drive Chicago, IL 60611	
Legion Park		
Leland Giants Park		
Leone (Sam) Beach Park	1222 W. Touhy Ave. Chicago, IL 60626	
Lerner (Leo) Park	7000 N. Sacramento Ave. Chicago, IL 60645	
Linden Park		
Loyola Park	1230 W. Greenleaf Ave. Chicago, IL 60626	
Maggie Daley Park		
Mahony Griffin (Marion) Park	1230 W. Jarvis Ave. Chicago, IL 60626	
Mather (Steven Tyng) Park	5941 N. Richmond St. Chicago, IL 60659	
Margaret Hie Ding Lin Park	1735 S. State St. Chicago IL	
Millennium Park		
Mandrake Park		
Mann Park		
Mariano Park		
Marquette Park		
Mason Park		
Mayfair Park		
McGuane Park		
McKinley Park		
Merrimac Park		
Merryman Park		
Metcalfe Park		
Midway Plaisance		
Monument Park		
Mount Greenwood Park		
Mozart Park		
Donald Jordan Nash Community Center		
Nichols Park		
Normal Park		
Normandy Park		
Northerly Island Park		
Oakdale Park		
Norwood Park		
Ogden Park		(former)
Ogden Plaza Park		
Olson Park and Waterfall		(demolished)
Jesse Owens Park		
Oz Park		
Park No. 474		
Park No. 512	1800 N. Ashland Chicago, IL 60622	Park is connected to both the Bloomingdale Trail Park and Walsh Park that are located just south.
Park No. 559		
Park No. 579 - Ridgeway Trailhead	1801 N. Ridgeway Ave. Chicago, IL 60647	Park contains the Exelon Observatory and connects to the Bloomingdale Trail Park just east.
Palmer Park		
Lucy Ella Gonzales Parsons Park		
Peoples Park		
Peterson Park		
Ping Tom Memorial Park		
Piotrowski Park		
Portage Park		
Pottawattomie Park	7340 N. Rogers Ave. Chicago, IL 60626	
William W. Powers State Recreation Area		
Promontory Point		
Pulaski Park		
Pullman National Historical Park		
Ravenswood Manor Park	4626 N. Manor Ave. Chicago, IL 60625	
Revere Park	2509 W. Irving Park Rd. Chicago, IL 60618	
Riis Park		
River Park	5100 N. Francisco Ave. Chicago, IL 60611	
River Esplanade Park		
Robichaux Park		
Robinson Park		
Rogers (Phillip) Park	7345 N. Washtenaw Ave. Chicago, IL 60645	
Rogers (Phillip) Beach Park	7705 N. Eastlake Terrace Chicago, IL 60626	
Rowan Park		
Russell Square Park		
Saint Louis Park		
Sauganash Park		
Scottsdale Park		
Seward Park		
Shabbona Park		
Shedd Park		
Sheil Park	3505 N. Southport Ave. Chicago, IL 60657	
Sherman Park		
Simons Park		
Skinner Park		
Smith Park		
South Shore Nature Reserve		
Spruce Park		
Stone (Bernard) Park	3150 W. Peterson Ave. Chicago, IL 60659	
Stanton-Schiller Park		
Stars and Stripes Park		
Strohacker (Howard) Park	4347 W. 54th St. Chicago, IL 60632	
Supera Playlot	2522 N. Racine Ave. Chicago, IL 60614	
Robert Taylor Park		
Mamie Till-Mobley Park		
Taylor-Lauridsen (John, Emil) Park	704 W. 42nd St. Chicago, IL 60609	The park was long known as Boyce Field. Renamed in September, 1976.
Touhy (Patrick) Park	7348 N. Paulina St. Chicago, IL 60626	
Triangle Park	1750 W. Juneway Terrace Chicago, IL 60626	
Trumbull Park		
Union Park		
Vittum Park		
Wang (Chi Che) Park	1719 W. Wolfram St. Chicago, IL 60657	
Warren (Laurence) Park	6601 N. Western Ave. Chicago, IL 60645	90 acres (36 ha)
Washington Park		
Washington Square Park		
Dinah Washington Park		
Harold Washington Park		
Welles Park		
White (Edward H.) Park	1120 W. 122nd St. Chicago, IL 60643	
White (Jesse) Park	410 W. Chicago Ave. Chicago, IL 60654	
White (Willye B.) Park	1610 W. Howard St. Chicago, IL 60626	
Wicker Park		
Wiggly Field Noethling Park		
Wildwood Park		
Williams Park		
Wilson Park		
Winnemac Park		
West Pullman Park		
Wrightwood Park	2534 N. Greenview Ave. Chicago, IL 60614	
