= Milton Lee Olive Park =

Park in Chicago, Illinois, U.S.

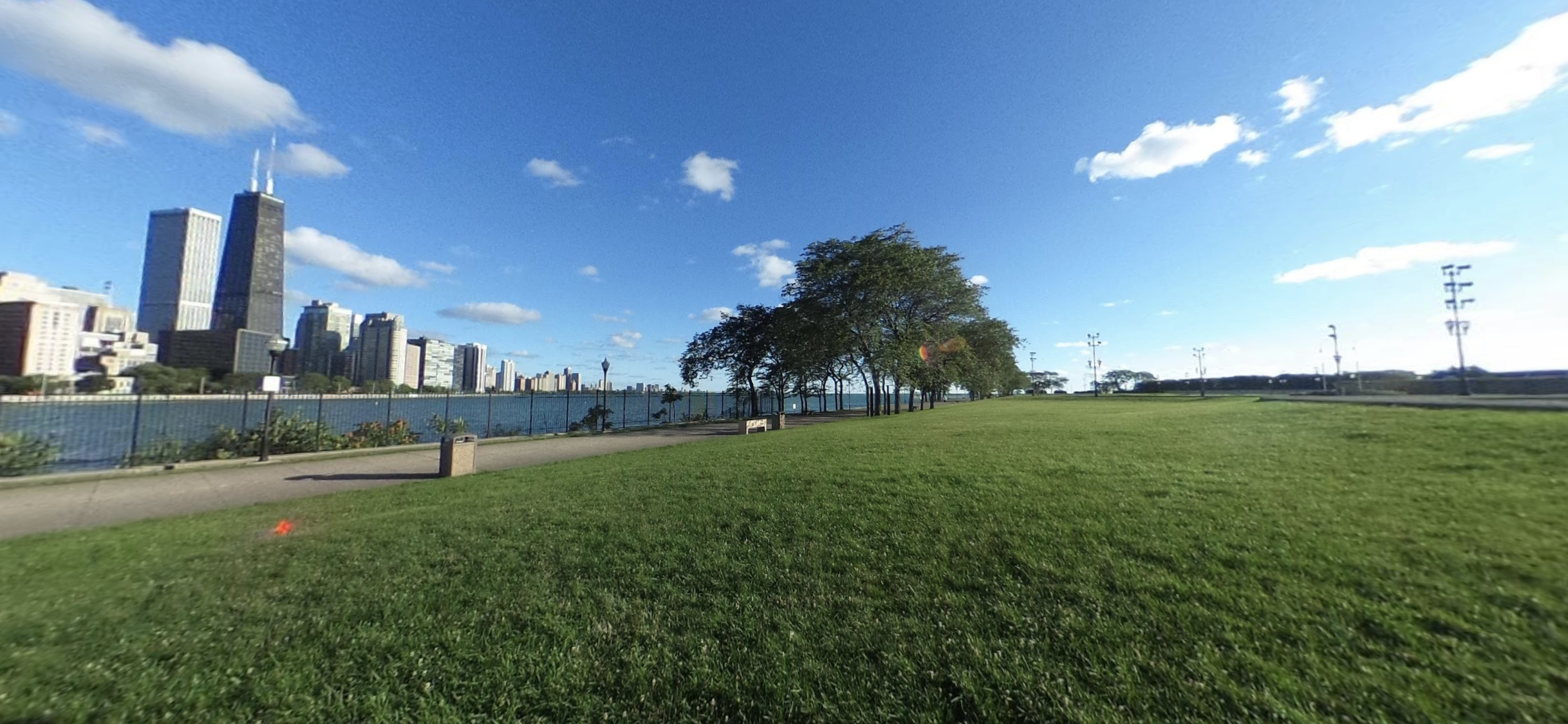
- Open space at Milton Lee Olive Park, with a view of the Chicago skyline along Lake Michigan
- Interactive map of Milton Lee Olive Park
- Location: Chicago, Illinois, U.S.
- Coordinates: 41°53′40″N 87°36′37″W

Milton Lee Olive Park is a public park in the city of Chicago, Illinois. Designed by Dan Kiley, the park is located west of the James W. Jardine Water Purification Plant and adjacent to Jane Addams Memorial Park and Ohio Street Beach. The park provides large grassy areas for recreation as well as paths for walking, jogging, and biking. Several benches are located in the park either in open, sunny areas or areas shaded by tall honey locust trees. The park contains multiple fountains creating large, circular seating areas. Open views of Lake Michigan and the Chicago skyline can be appreciated from the park.

== Fountains ==
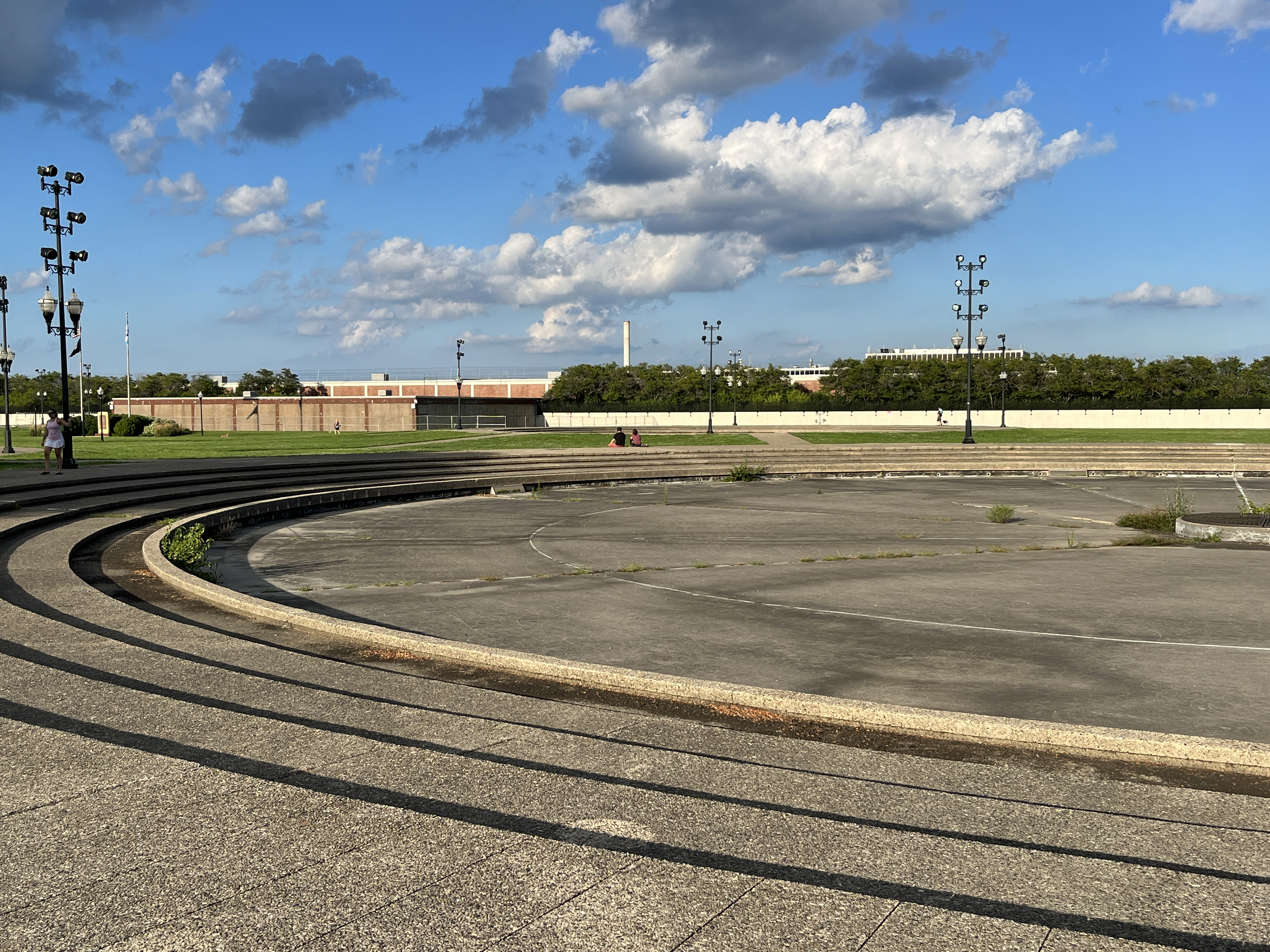
The park in 2023

There are a total of five concrete circular fountains connected by open grass and concrete pathways. These fountains are made to represent the five Great Lakes and continue with the theme of the water filtration plant next door.

== History ==
The Milton Lee Olive Park was designed by Dan Kiley in 1965 to commemorate Milton L. Olive, III, a Vietnam veteran and the first African American to receive the Medal of Honor, who grew up and lived in Chicago. In 1966, President Lyndon B Johnson officially dedicated the park to Milton Lee Olive alongside Milton L. Olive III’s father and stepmother. The park consists of ten acres and is located on a 61-acre peninsula in Lake Michigan on the grounds of the Jardine Water Purification Plant. The architect of the park is Dan Kiley who also worked on the Art Institute of Chicago’s South Garden. During the Parks conception, Dan Kiley worked with Stan Gladych from the architecture firm C.F. Murphy

== Other features ==
The park is home to a statue titled Hymn to Water by artist Milton Horn. The park was the location of the finish line for the 29th season of an American reality program The Amazing Race.
