= Smith Park =

Smith Park may refer to:

- Smith Park (Middletown, Connecticut), a public park
- Smith Park (Valdosta, Georgia), a public park
- Smith Park, Chicago, Illinois, a neighborhood
- Smith Park (Chicago), Chicago, Illinois, a park
- Smith Park Architectural District, Jackson, Mississippi, listed on the National Register of Historic Places
