= Centennial Fountain =

Fountain in Chicago, Illinois

Coordinates: 41°53′19.85″N 87°37′3.39″W

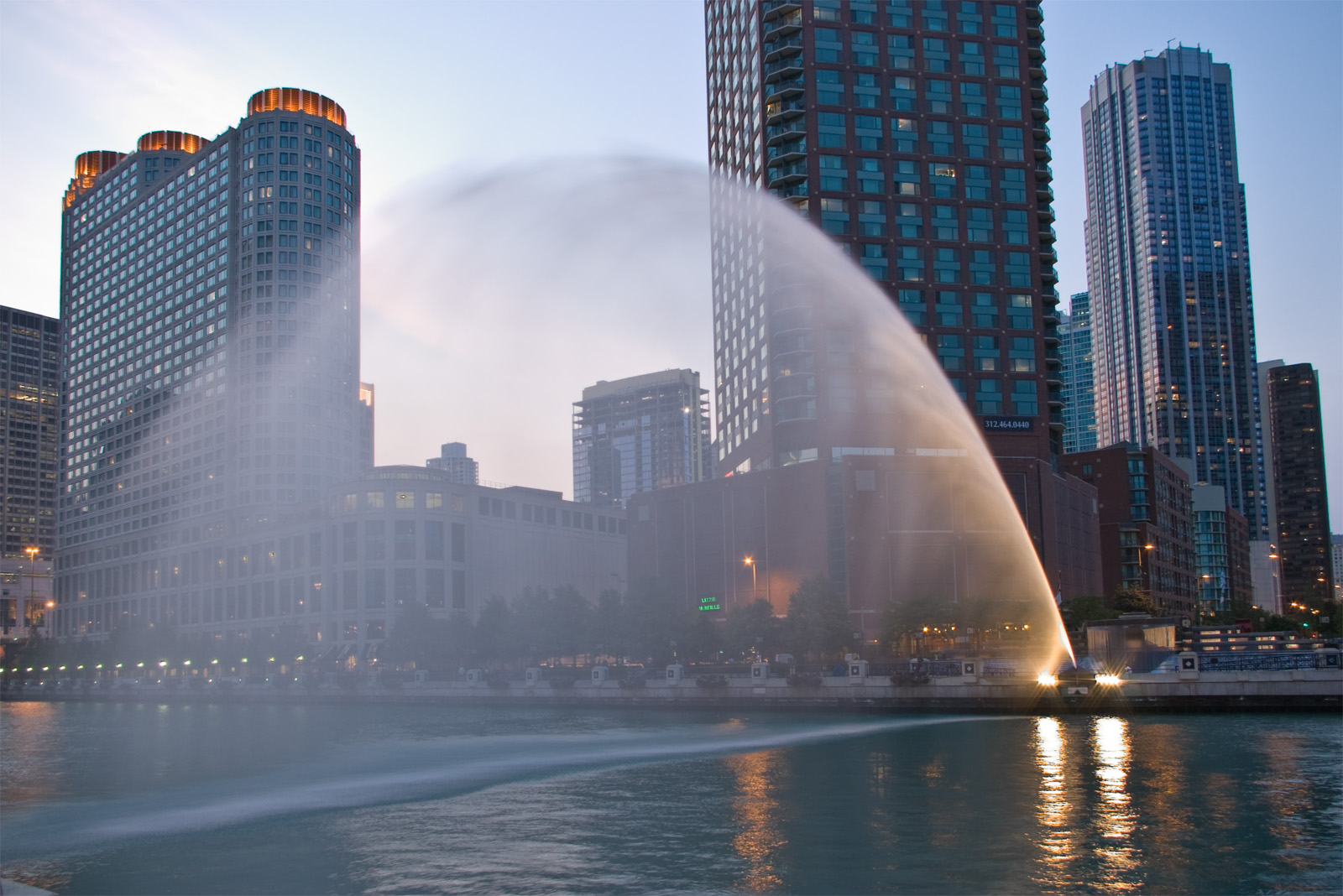
The Centennial Fountain water arc

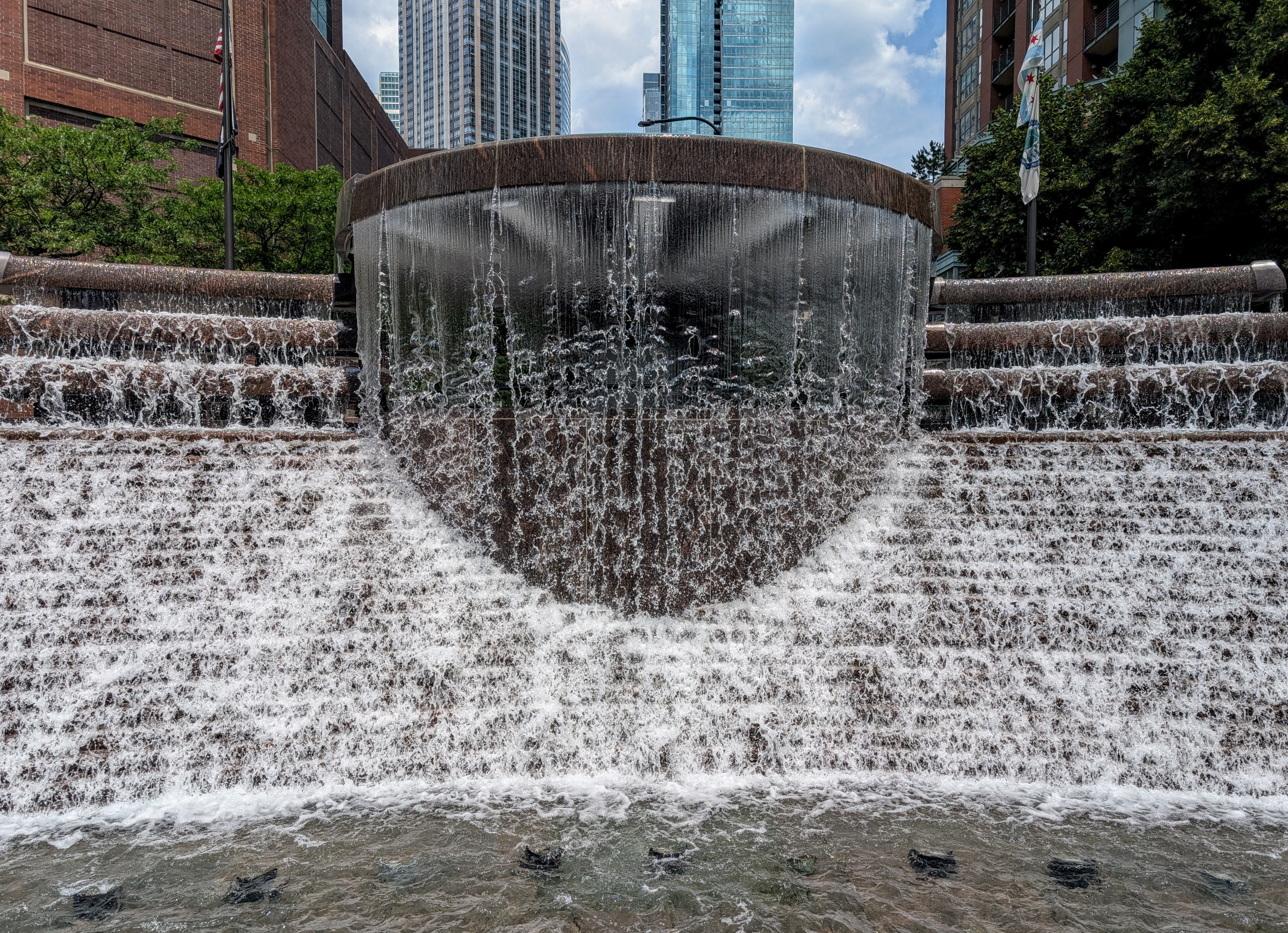
Close view of the Centennial Fountain

The Nicholas J. Melas Centennial Fountain is located on the north bank of the Chicago River at McClurg Court in Near North Side, Chicago. It was dedicated in 1989, to celebrate the 100th anniversary of the Metropolitan Water Reclamation District of Greater Chicago, perhaps best known for its major achievement in reversing the flow of the Chicago River in 1900; and in 1999, this system was named a "Civil Engineering Monument of the Millennium" by the American Society of Civil Engineers (ASCE).

== History ==
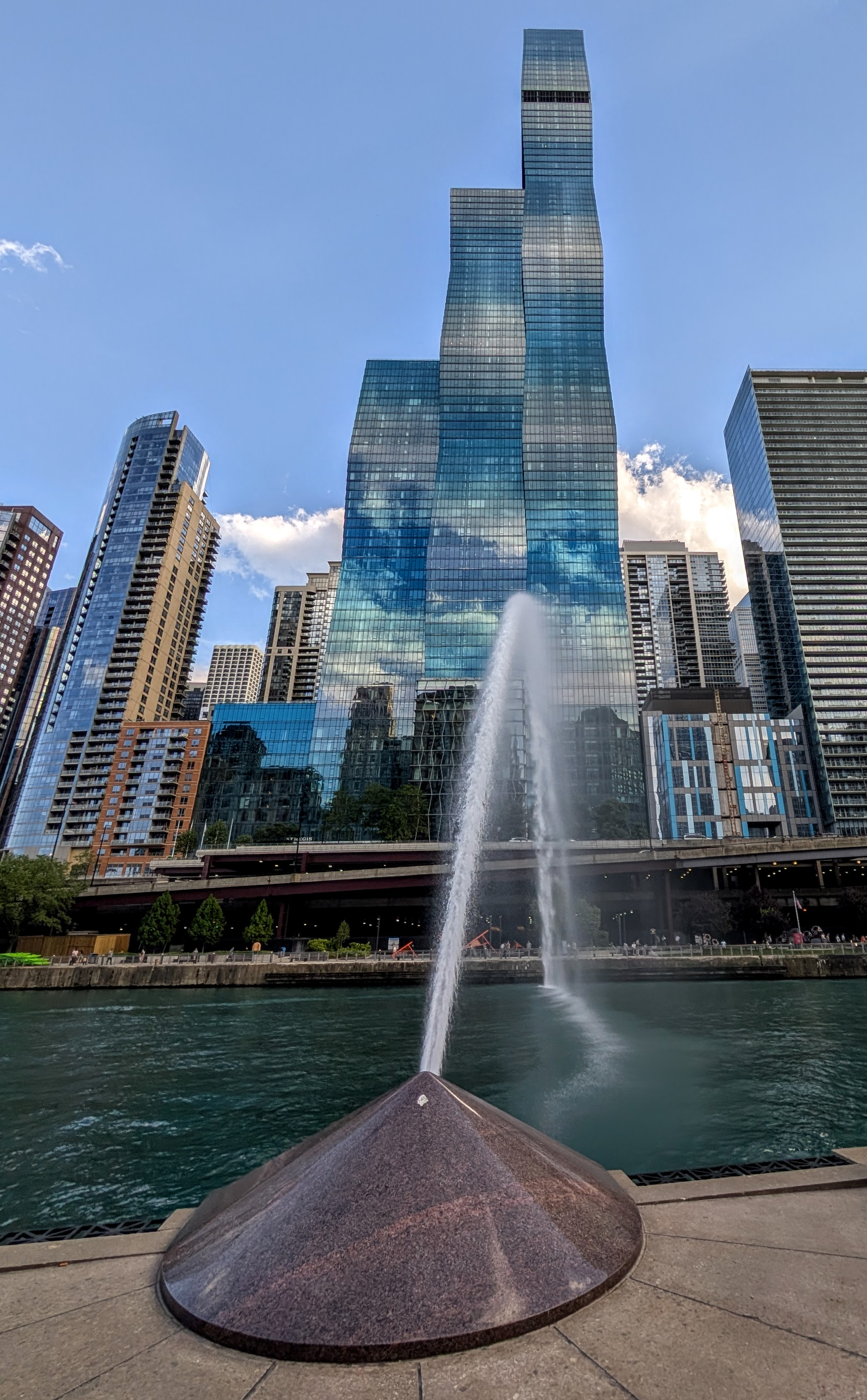
The water arc seen from River Esplanade Park

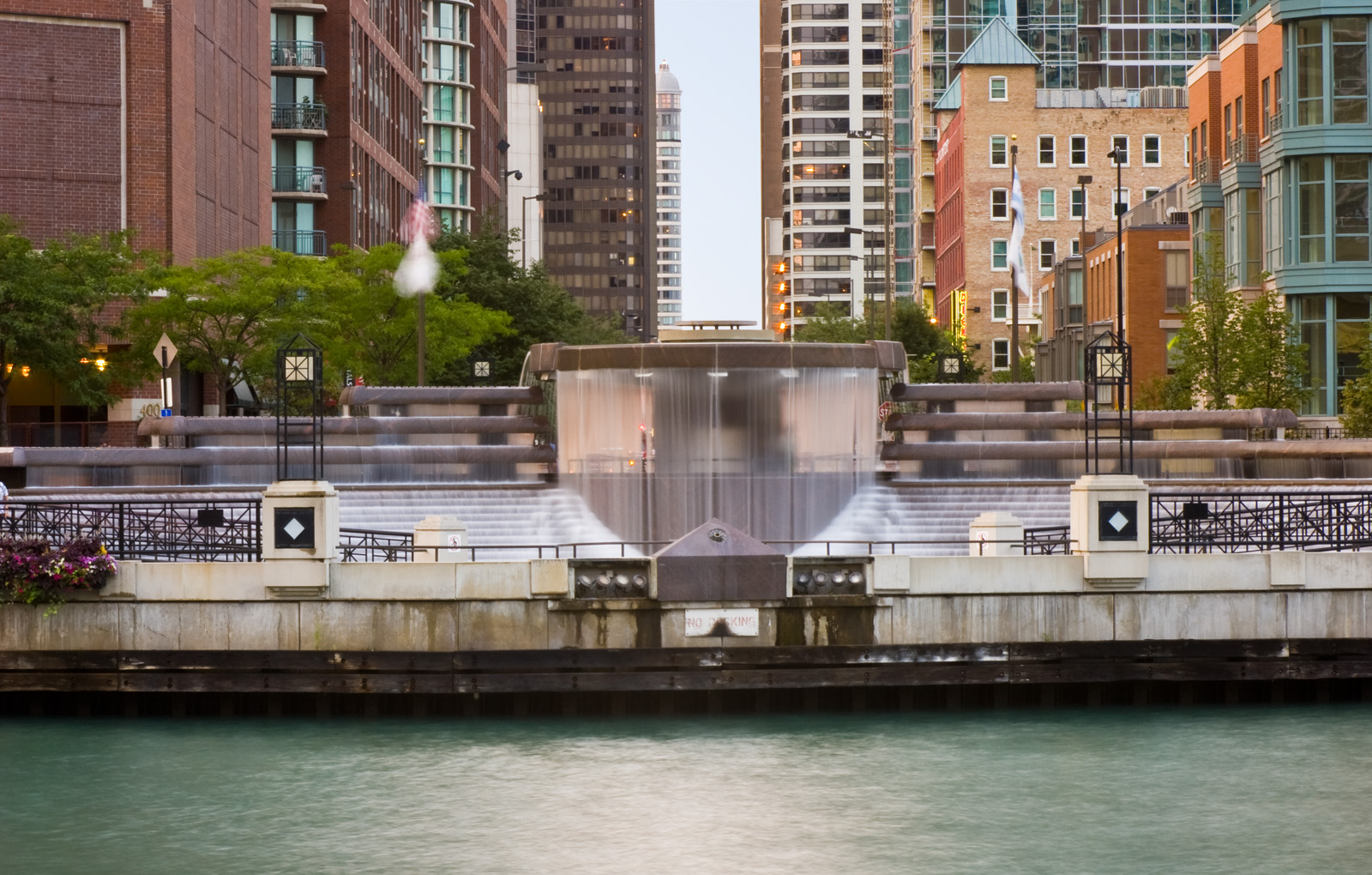
The fountain waterfall as seen from across the Chicago River

As the Metropolitan Water Reclamation District of Chicago was soon to celebrate its 100-year anniversary, its architects came up with building a fountain along the Chicago River. They designed a fountain that includes a sculptural sun dial along the side of the river. The fountain opened in 1989.

The fountain was named after Nicholas J. Melas who was elected in 1962 to the district's Board of Commissioners. Melas was re-elected five times, serving for thirty years—the last eighteen as President of the Board.

The fountain's controls were damaged by flooding in May 2020, and after extensive design and engineering, work to refurbish the fountain began in 2022. The fountain reopened on August 16, 2024.

== Features ==
The fountain designed by Lohan Associates, every hour, on the hour, shoots a large eighty-foot water arc across the river from a modernist tiered waterfall. The waterfall and the water cannon both operate from 10:00am to 11:00pm every day in the warm months.

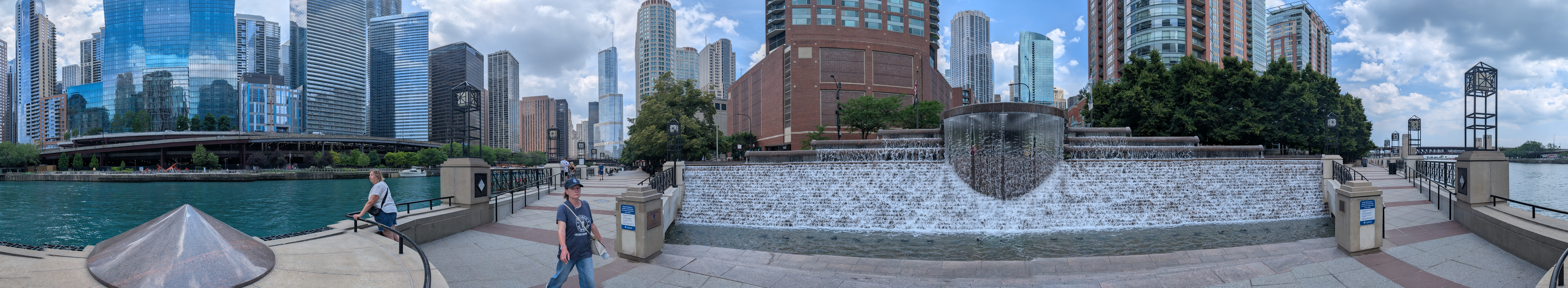
Panoramic view of Centennial Fountain at River Esplanade Park

== See also ==
- River Esplanade Park
