= Michigan Avenue (Chicago) =

Avenue in Chicago, Illinois

- 100 East
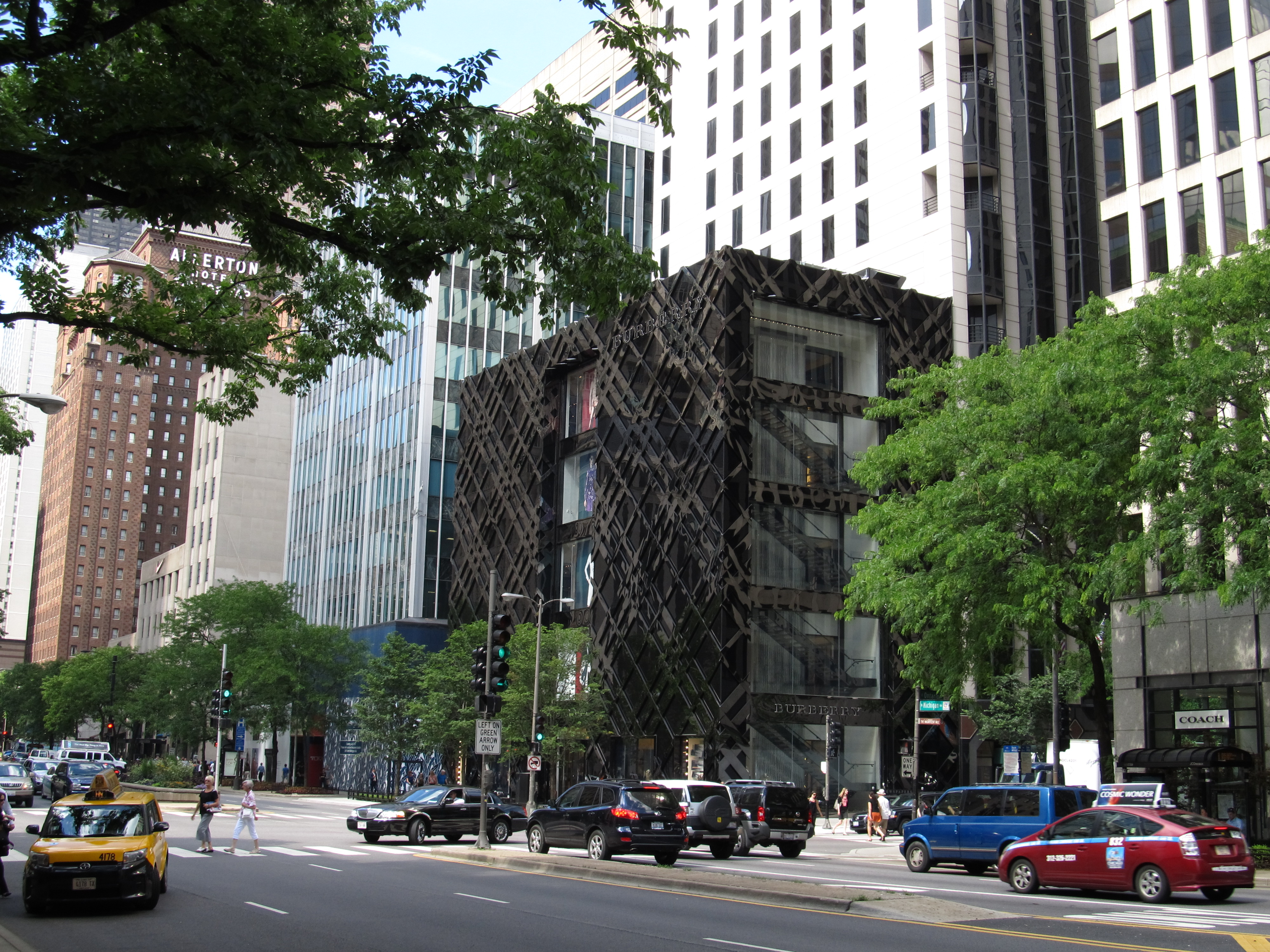
- Michigan Avenue in the Streeterville neighborhood of Chicago
- Maintained by: Local city jurisdictions
- Location: South Holland–Chicago
- South end: Prairie Avenue in South Holland
- Major junctions: IL 83 at South Holland–Dolton line; US 12 / US 20 in Roseland, Chicago
- North end: US 41 in Near North Side, Chicago

Michigan Avenue is a north-south street in Chicago that runs at 100 east on the Chicago grid. The northern end of the street is at DuSable Lake Shore Drive on the shore of Lake Michigan in the Gold Coast Historic District. The street's southern terminus is at Sibley Boulevard in the southern suburb of Dolton, but like several other very long Chicago streets, it exists in several disjointed segments.

As the home of the Chicago Water Tower, the Art Institute of Chicago, Millennium Park, and the shopping on the Magnificent Mile, it is a street well-known to Chicago natives as well as tourists to the city. Michigan Avenue also is the main commercial street of Streeterville. It includes all of the Historic Michigan Boulevard District and most of the Michigan–Wacker Historic District, including the scenic urban space anchored by the DuSable (Michigan Avenue) Bridge.

== History ==
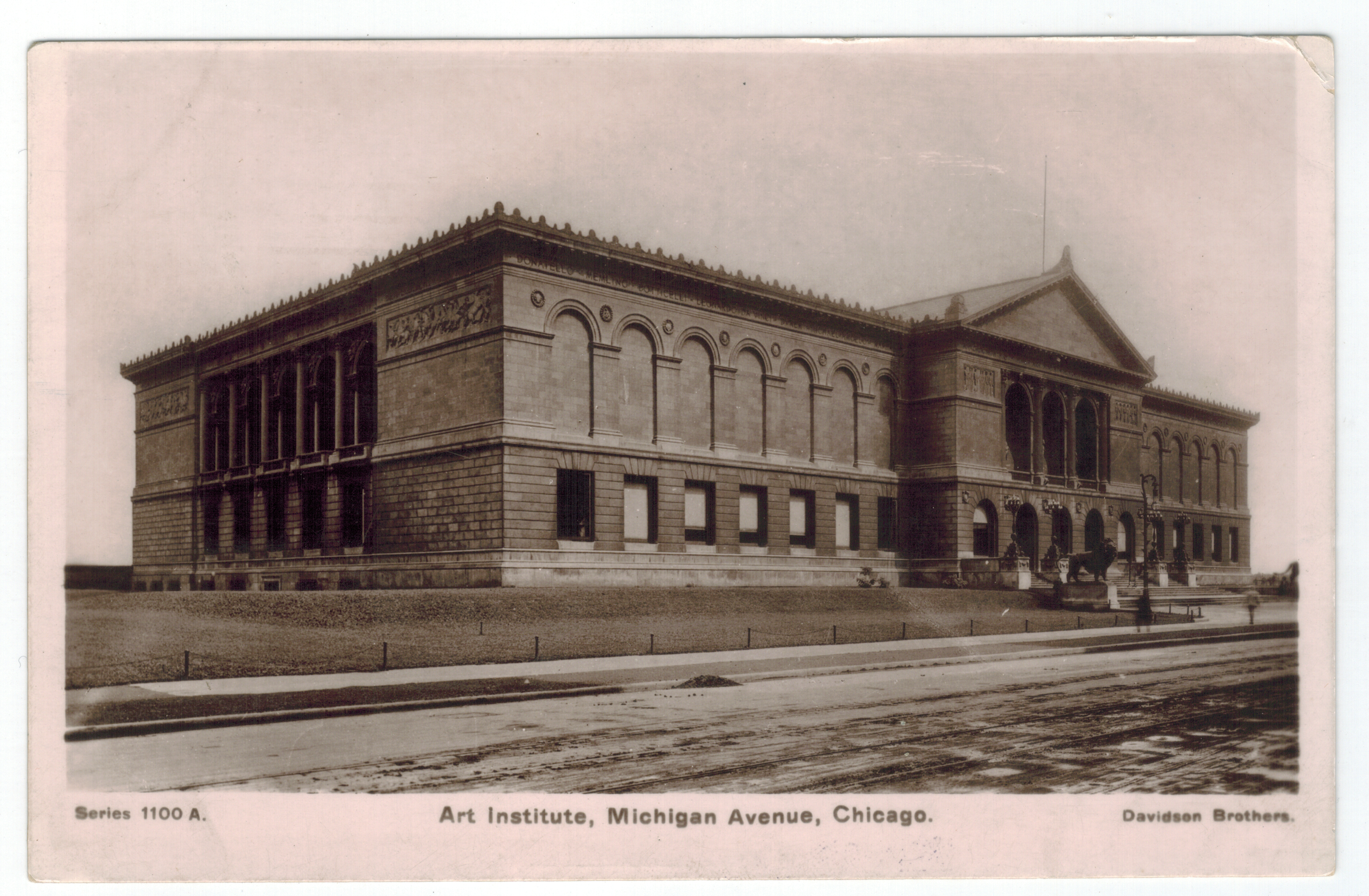
A c. 1907 postcard of the Art Institute of Chicago

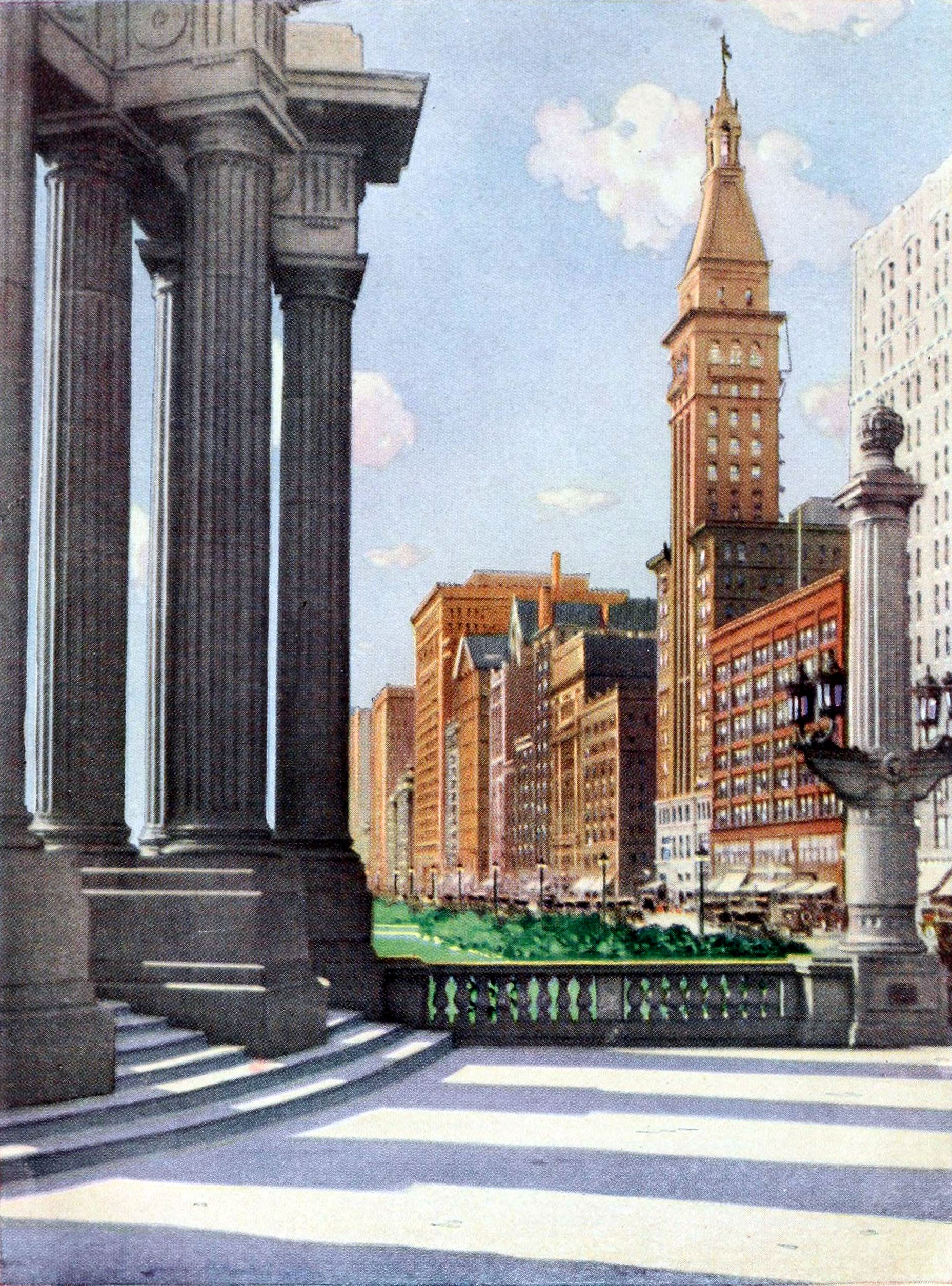
A 1921 edition of Collier's magazine featuring Michigan Avenue from Grant Park

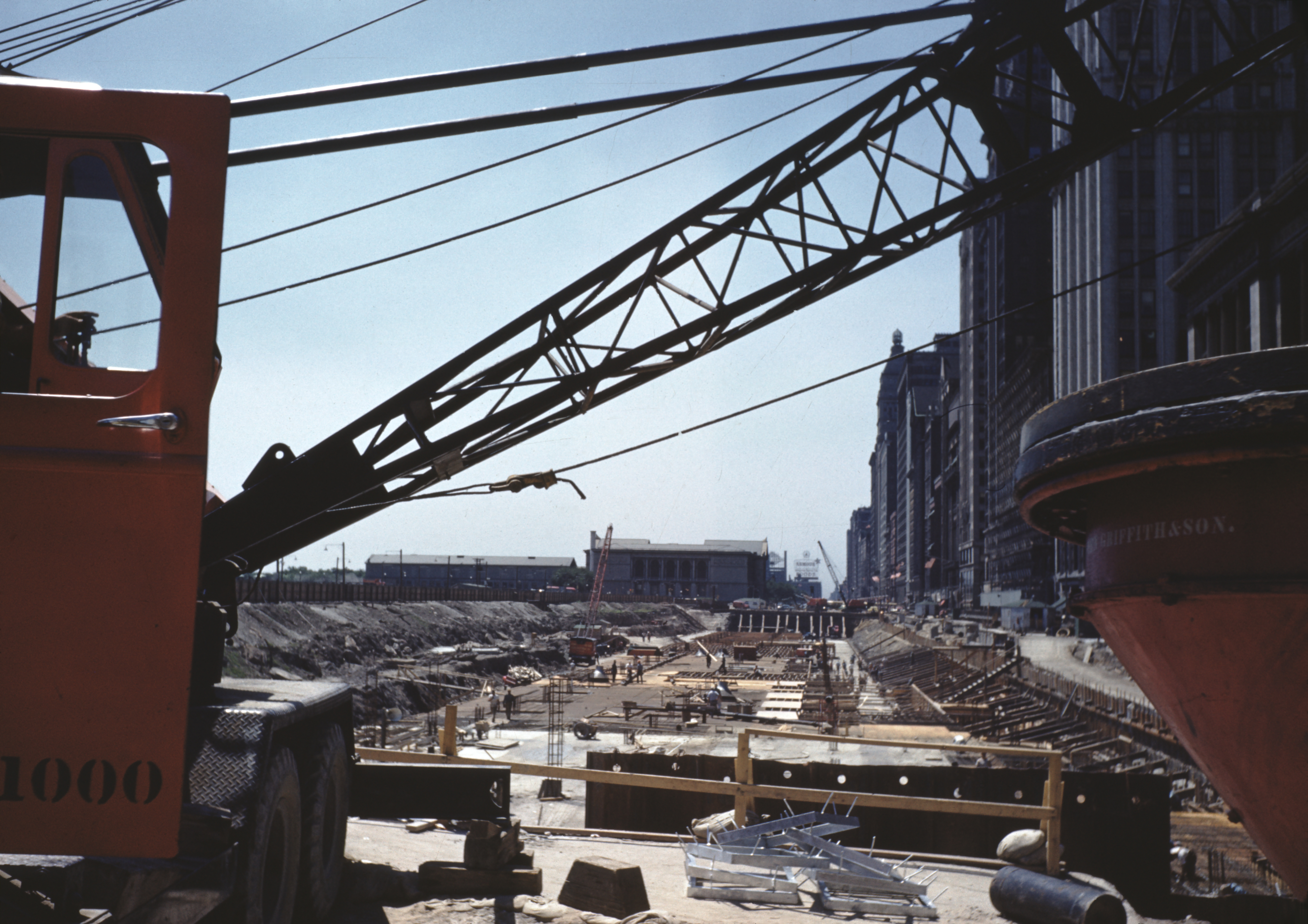
Michigan Avenue under renovation in the 1950s with the Art Institute of Chicago visible in the background

=== 19th century ===
The oldest section of Michigan Avenue is the portion that currently borders Grant Park in the Chicago Loop section of the city. The name came from Lake Michigan, which until 1871 was immediately east of Michigan Avenue. The street at that time ran north to the Chicago River and south to the city limits. Michigan Avenue initially was primarily residential. By the 1860s, large homes and expensive row houses dominated Michigan Avenue.

At no point is Michigan Avenue currently called Michigan Boulevard, but prior to the Great Chicago Fire of 1871, the street was officially known as Michigan Boulevard and often referred to as "Boul Mich". But in the 1900–1907 ads for the Chicago Musical College, the address was referred to as "202 Michigan Boul." As recently as the 1920s, North Michigan Avenue (especially the Magnificent Mile) was referred to as "Upper Boul Mich". Paris's Boulevard Saint-Michel is the original Boul Mich.

North of the Chicago River today's Michigan Avenue was known as Pine Street. In 1866, a small portion of Pine Street was "vacated" and moved 80 feet (24 m) further west of the original Pine street location to accommodate the installation of the new pumping station's standpipe. This standpipe, engineered to regulate water pressure, would be housed within architect William W. Boyington's castle structure (Water Tower) that still stands on that site today. In 1869 the Board of Public Works began paving Pine Street from Chicago Avenue to Whitney street (today, Walton street) the northern terminus, with Belgian wood blocks also known as Nicolson pavement.

Pine Street was renamed to Lincoln Park Boulevard as far south as Ohio Street when the street connected with Lake Shore Drive in the early 1890s, and then became part of Michigan Avenue, which already had the name Michigan Avenue and was called Michigan Boulevard before the Great Chicago Fire in 1871, south of the Chicago River. Both the North and South Michigan Avenues were joined physically with the opening of the Michigan Avenue bridge in 1920. In 1926, after years of clogged automobile traffic, the water tower and pumping station were separated by realigning Michigan Avenue to run between them.

In the Great Fire of 1871, all buildings on Michigan Avenue from Congress Street north to the river were destroyed. Immediately after the fire, the character of Michigan remained residential, but the street no longer was directly on the lake shore, as after the Fire, wreckage from the burnt district was used to fill in the inner harbor of Chicago, beginning the landfills that by the 1920s had moved the lake shore more than a quarter-mile east of its original shoreline, creating space for an expanded Grant Park. Beginning in the 1880s, the expansion of the central business district replaced houses on Michigan Avenue so that today, Michigan's character is primarily commercial north of 35th Street.

The first city showcase on Michigan Avenue was the Exposition Building, which was built on the current site of the Art Institute, the east side of Michigan at Adams, in 1874. By the 1890s, an imposing wall of buildings was constructed on the west side of Michigan Avenue downtown, including the Auditorium Building and the main branch of the Chicago Public Library (now the Chicago Cultural Center). As the east side of Michigan Avenue downtown was developed as a park, the wall of buildings lining the west side of Michigan Avenue across from the park became the nucleus of the city's skyline.

=== 20th century ===
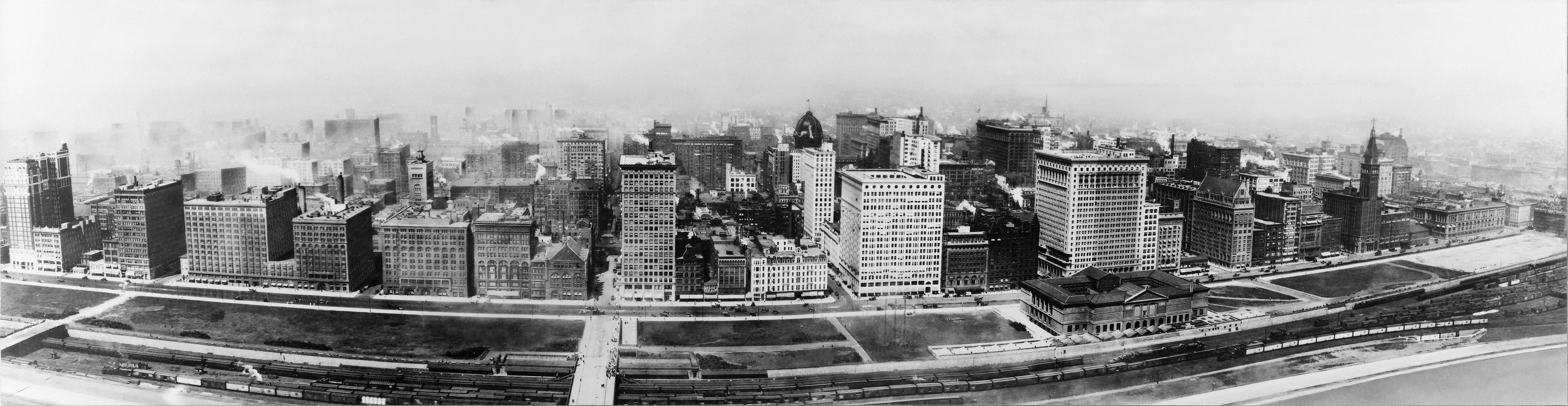
Historic Michigan Boulevard District in 1911

In 1924, the first traffic lights in Chicago were installed on Michigan Avenue after John D. Hertz fronted the city $34,000 for the purchase, installation, and maintenance. In July 1940, the Russeks women's clothing store chain opened up a store at 200 North Michigan Avenue. It was the first retail establishment in the Midwest to be entirely equipped with fluorescent lighting, and was noted for being entirely air conditioned.

Historically, Illinois Route 1 and U.S. Route 41 were routed on Michigan Avenue. Illinois Route 1 has been truncated to Chicago's south side and U.S. Route 41 is now routed on Lake Shore Drive.

== Route description ==
=== North Michigan Avenue and the Magnificent Mile ===
North Michigan Avenue and The Magnificent Mile

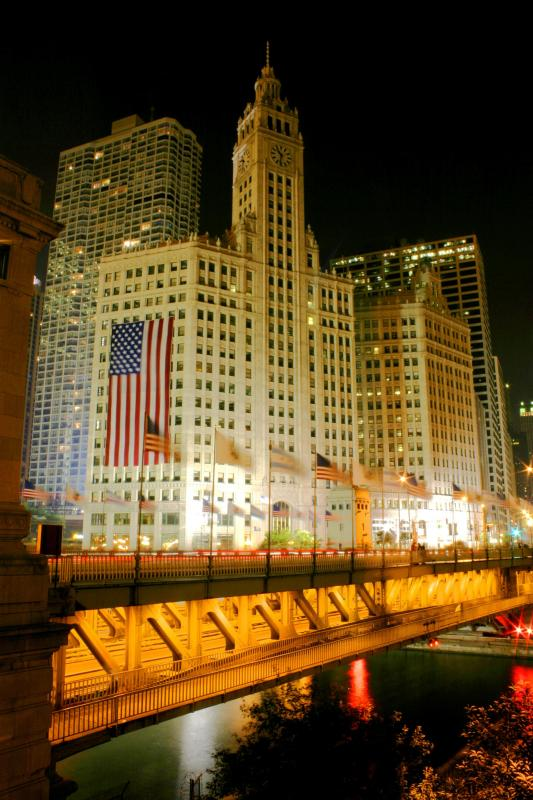
Michigan Avenue Bridge across the Chicago River

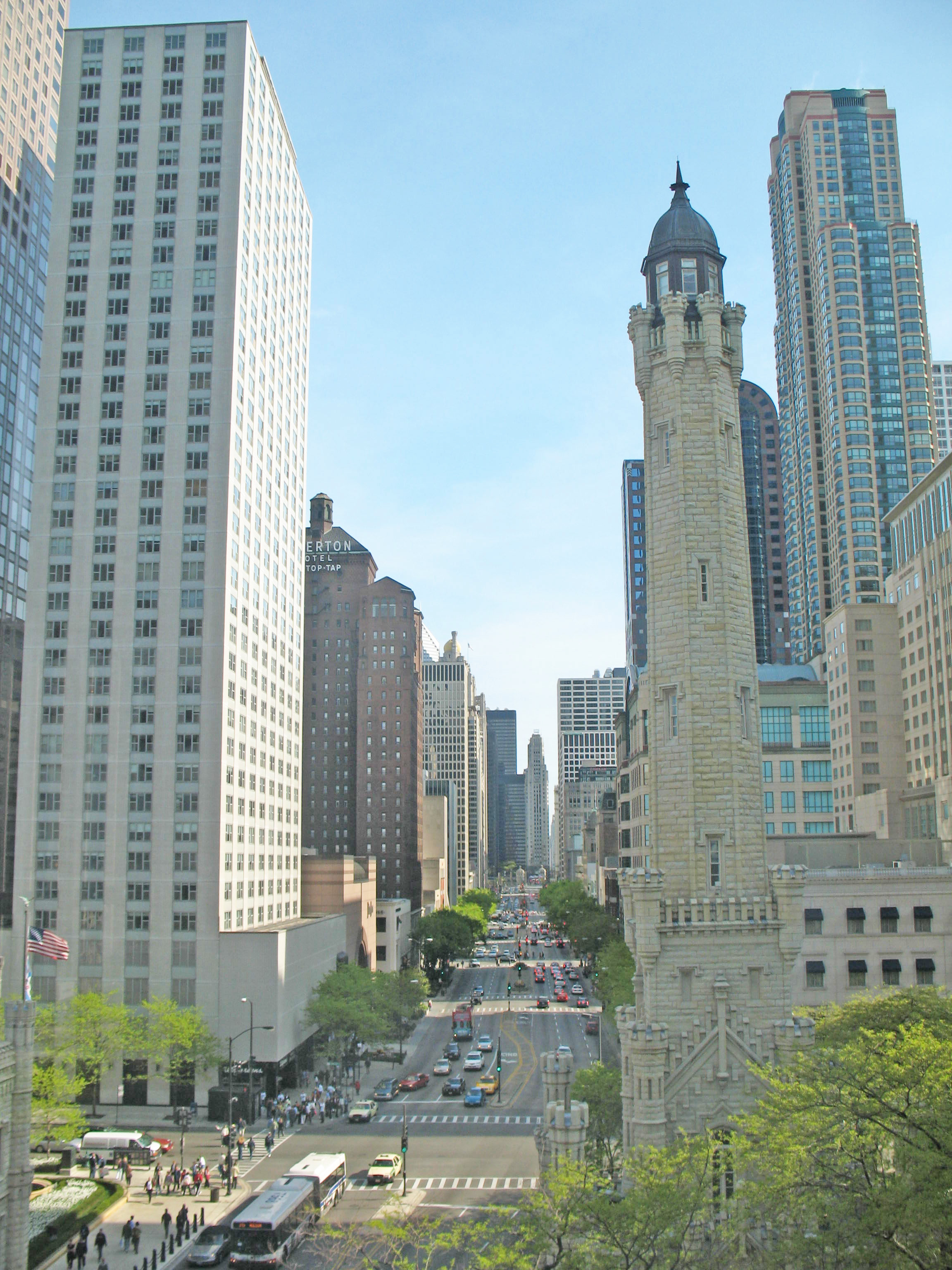
Magnificent Mile shopping

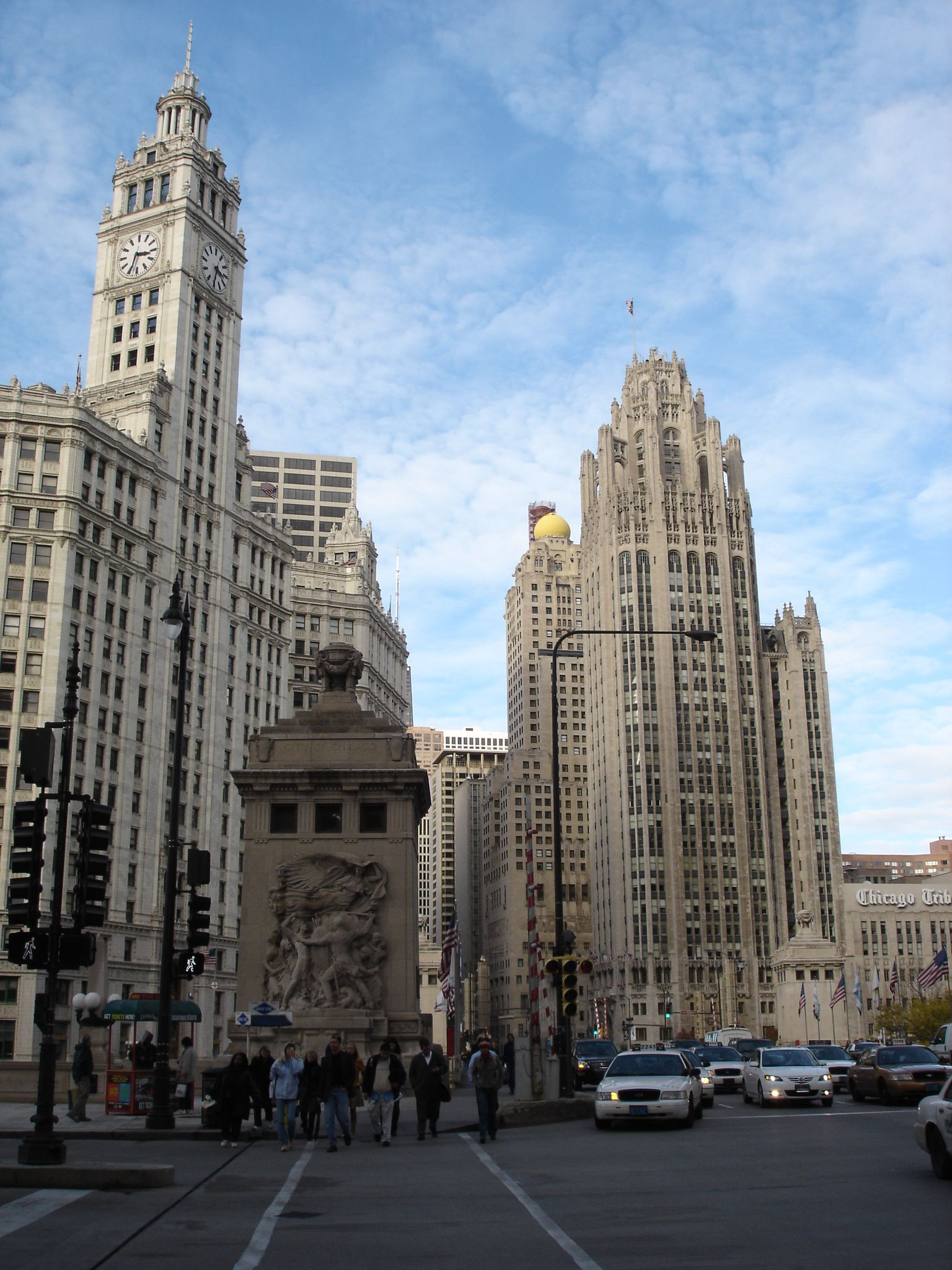
The southern end of Magnificent Mile

Michigan Avenue originally ended at the Chicago River, and what is now Michigan Avenue north of the river was originally named Pine Street, after scattered pine trees originally found in its vicinity. As early as 1891, plans were proposed to extend Michigan Avenue north across the river. An early plan called for a tunnel to link Michigan Avenue south of the river with Pine Street, and in 1903 an editorial in the Chicago Tribune newspaper proposed a new Bascule bridge across the river at Michigan Avenue.

This plan was further elaborated upon in Daniel Burnham's 1909 Plan of Chicago, and in 1911 a plan was selected that included the widening of Michigan Avenue from Randolph Street to the river, replacing the Rush Street bridge with a new bridge at Michigan Avenue and the construction of a double-decked boulevard along Pine Street as far as Ohio Street. When the Michigan Avenue Bridge was completed, Pine Street was renamed Michigan Avenue. At its north end it merges into Lake Shore Drive near the Drake Hotel.

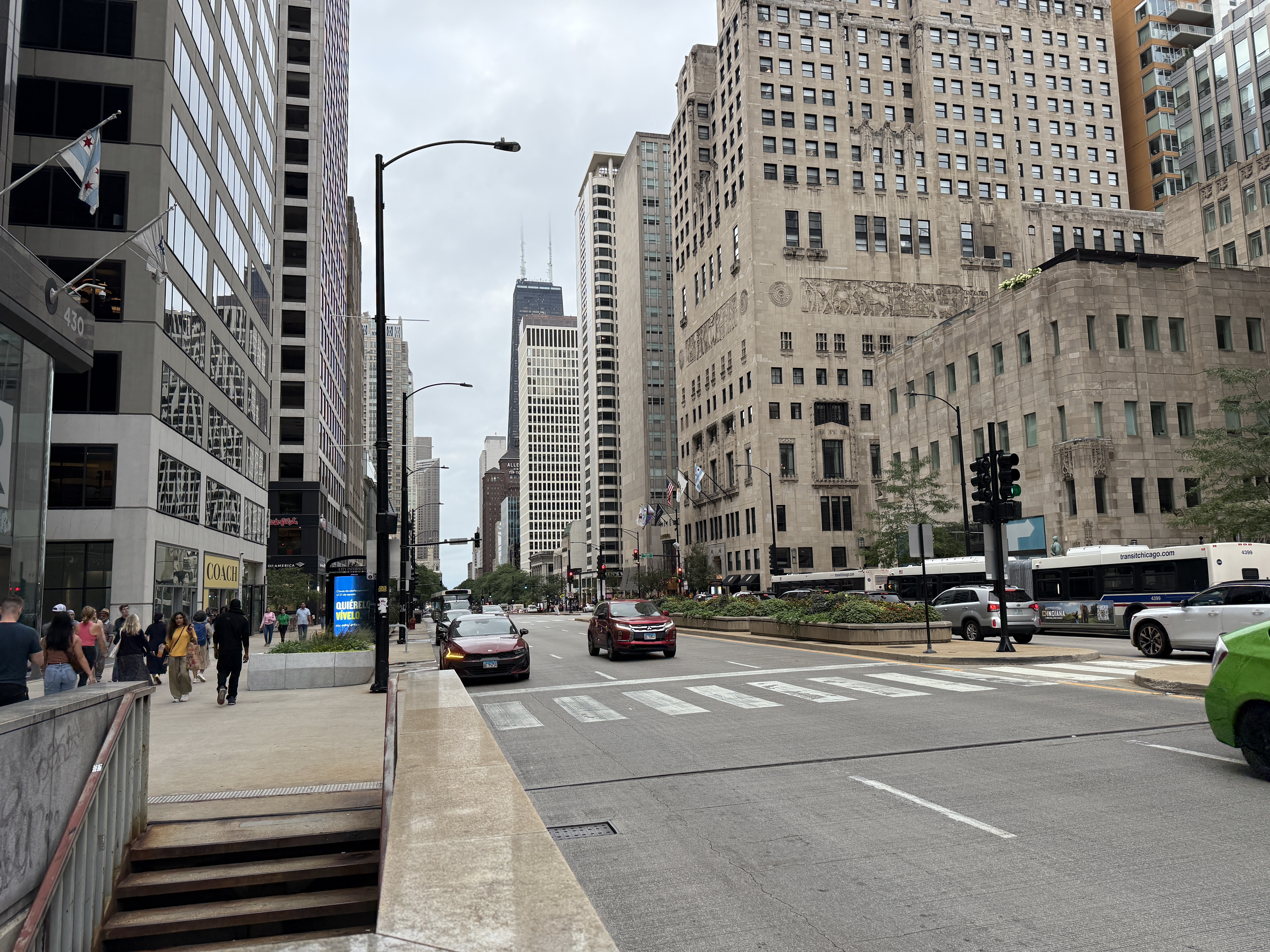
Michigan Avenue along the "Magnificent Mile"

Today, the area north of the Chicago River is referred to as the "Magnificent Mile", or sometimes simply the Mag Mile. It contains a mixture of upscale department stores, restaurants, high-end retailers, office buildings and hotels, and caters primarily to tourists and the affluent. The area also has a high concentration of the city's advertising agencies.

It is the home of Chicago's famous Water Tower landmark, Jane Byrne Park around the Water Tower with its historic clock, as well as the eight-level Water Tower Place shopping center which grew up next door to, and overshadowed, the comparatively diminutive landmark. North of the shopping center can be found the famous John Hancock Center, the Art Deco Palmolive Building (also known as the Playboy Building) and the lavish Drake Hotel. The entire mile is noted for its spectacular Christmas displays. At the northern edge of this district can be found the One Magnificent Mile building; Chicago Landmark East Lake Shore Drive District, an extremely expensive and exclusive one-block area of real estate running east from North Michigan Avenue and facing directly onto Lake Michigan; and the on-ramp to northbound Lake Shore Drive.

=== From the River southwards ===
Michigan Avenue Historic District

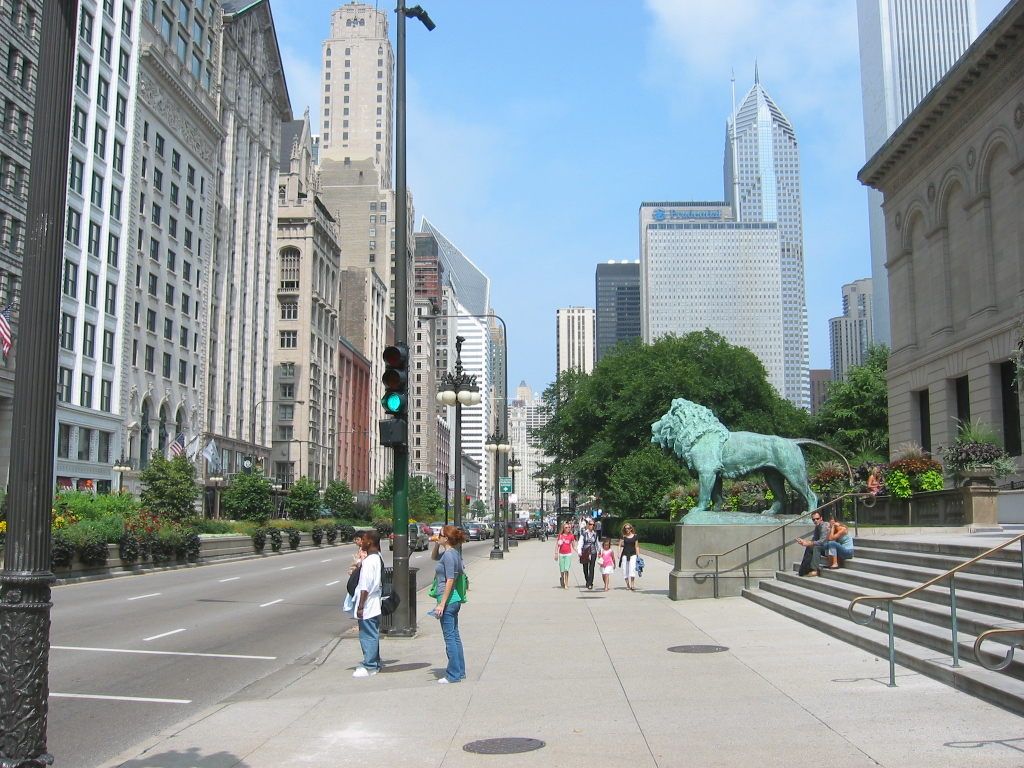
Outside the Art Institute of Chicago, looking north

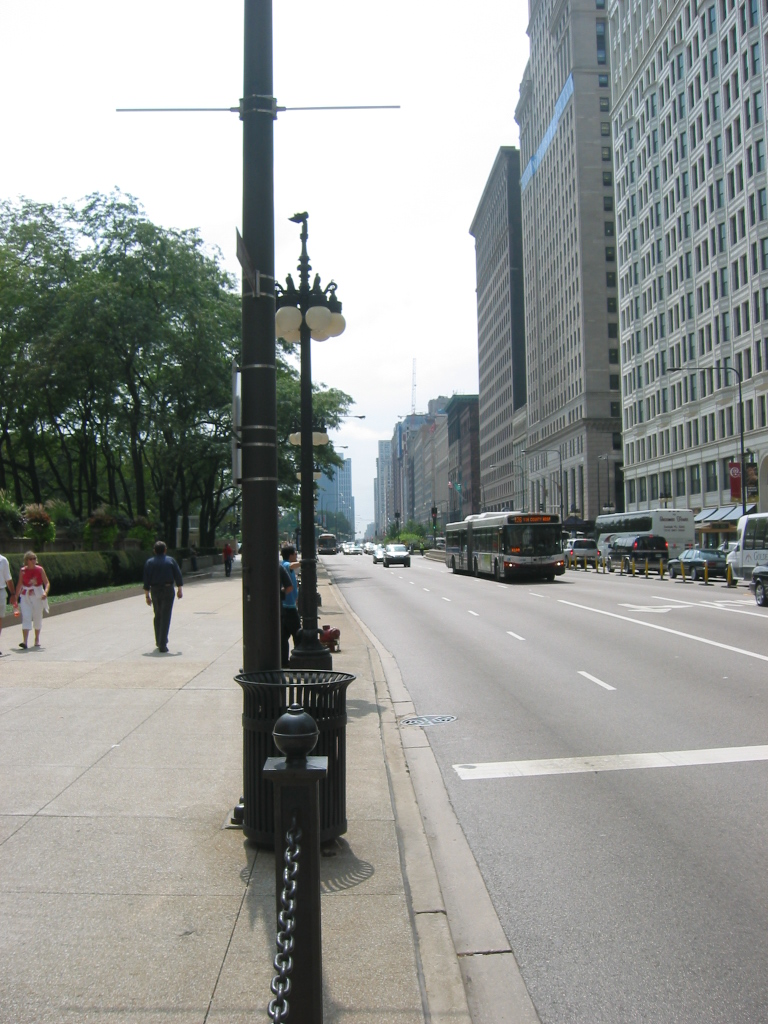
Outside the Art Institute of Chicago, looking south

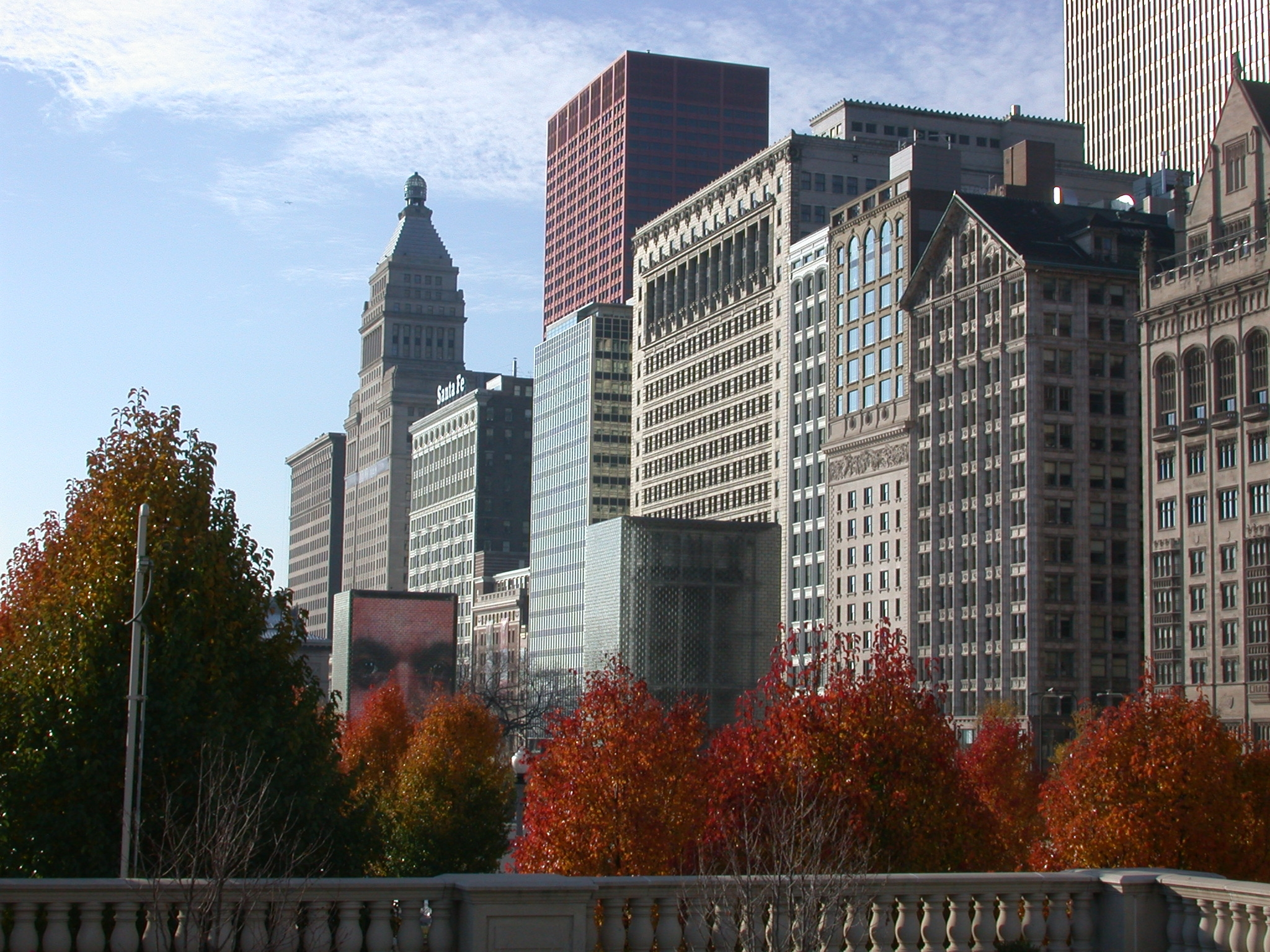
Southbound view of Michigan Avenue from Millennium Park

For a few blocks on both sides of the Chicago River, the road is double-decked, including the bridge over the river. The lower level north of the river is where the famous Billy Goat Tavern is located, and south of the river it intersects with Lower Wacker Drive. On the upper lever, tall office buildings and hotels line both sides of the Avenue, until Millennium Park.

The portion of Michigan Avenue opposite Grant Park is the Chicago Landmark Historic Michigan Boulevard District. Major cultural institutions, such as the Chicago Cultural Center, Symphony Center, and the Auditorium Theatre are located here, as are many late 19th and early 20th century skyscrapers. In 2009, the Chicago Cultural Mile Association was created to bring "awareness of the unique strengths and diverse offerings available to visitors" in this portion of Michigan Avenue.

The Art Institute of Chicago is across the boulevard, in Grant Park along the Avenue. Several large historic hotels are located just south of Ida B. Wells Drive, including the Hilton Towers Chicago (formerly, the Stevens Hotel), the Congress Plaza Hotel and The Blackstone Hotel. Between them is the Spertus Institute of Jewish Studies.

The Avenue extends south into Near South Side, Chicago and beyond – past what was once the notorious Levee District, the graceful homes of the Prairie Avenue District, the historic Second Presbyterian Church, the former home of the legendary Chess Records at 2120 South Michigan and the site where the Lexington Hotel, a hideout of Al Capone, once stood.

South of Cermak Road is the Motor Row District, a historic strip along Michigan Avenue that was home to many early 20th century automobile "palaces." A point of interest in this area is the former Illinois Automobile Club, which later was used as the home of The Chicago Defender, a prominent African-American Chicago newspaper at 2400 South Michigan. A little bit further south is Bronzeville, a historic black community in Chicago. Points of interest include the historic Mercy Hospital and Medical Center, the Illinois College of Optometry and the South Side Community Art Center.

The intersection of Michigan Avenue and 35th Street is home to two important local institutions. On the northwest corner is De La Salle Institute, a Catholic high school which was attended by future Chicago mayors Richard J. Daley, Richard M. Daley, and Michael Bilandic. On the southwest corner is the Chicago Police Department Headquarters. Michigan Avenue continues through the South Side and dead ends at 63rd Street, just north of a rail yard and parking lots.

The Avenue continues heading south at 66th Street to Marquette Road, where it moves a half-block to the east back into alignment with the run north of 63rd Street. It then continues south to 89th Street where it dead ends once again for a housing subdivision and a railroad line. It resumes at 91st Street heading south through the working class Roseland community, featuring a large commercial strip along Michigan between 111th and 115th streets. The street dead ends again at 127th Street just before the Cal-Sag Channel. It begins again in the south suburb of Riverdale before finally terminating at Sibley Boulevard or IL RT-83.

== Transportation ==
The Chicago "L" Red Line's Chicago and Grand stations are useful for reaching the Magnificent Mile. Both the Monroe and Jackson stations are close to the Art Institute. Stations on the east side of the Loop (Adams/Wabash and Washington/Wabash stations) are also close to the Art Institute. Millennium and Van Buren Street stations are located east of Michigan Avenue serving the Metra Electric and South Shore Lines. The avenue is also traversed by a multitude of bus routes and taxi cabs primarily in the Downtown and Magnificent Mile areas.

South of downtown, plenty of bus routes (e.g. bus routes 1 and 4) continue to run south along Michigan Avenue before reaching the Bronzeville neighborhood. There are no bus routes along Michigan Avenue between 35th Street and 95th Street. South of 95th Street, more bus routes run along Michigan Avenue as multiple bus routes on the South Side end at the 95th/Dan Ryan station. One bus route, 34 South Michigan, travels from 95th/Dan Ryan station to Altgeld Gardens Homes via its namesake street.

At 121st Street, the State Street station on the Blue Island branch of the Metra Electric District serves Michigan Avenue.
