= Mariano Park =

Park in Chicago, Illinois, United States

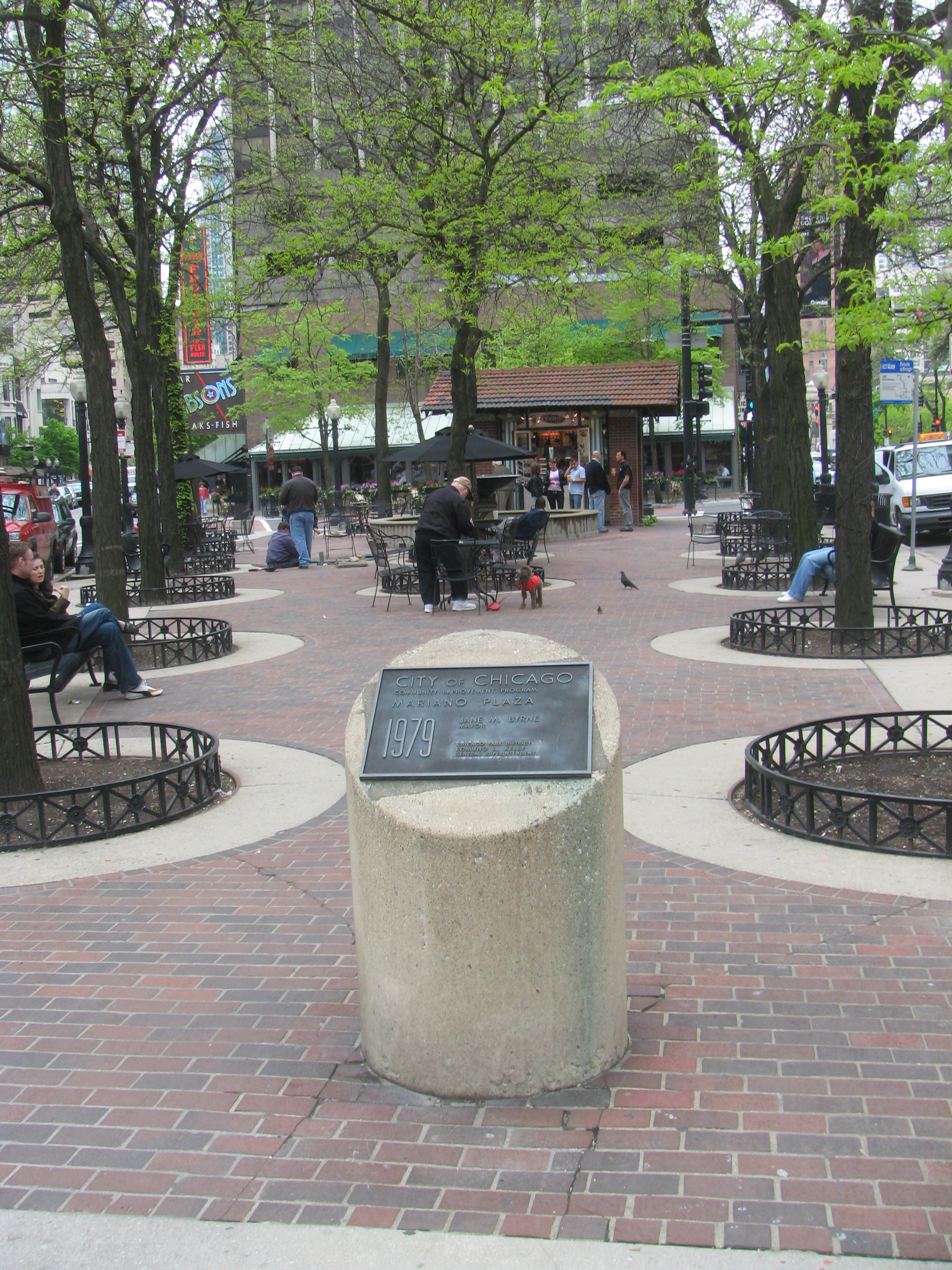
- Mariano Park in Chicago
- Interactive map of Mariano Park
- Type: Urban park
- Coordinates: 41°54′07″N 87°37′41″W
- Created: 1848; 178 years ago
- Operator: Chicago Park District

Mariano Park (also known as Mariano Plaza) is a small public park in Chicago at the intersection of Rush Street and State Street in Gold Coast. It has an official address of 1031 North State Street. The land was initially acquired by the city in 1848 but was not transferred to the Chicago Park District until 1959.

The park and surrounding area is colloquially known as "Viagra Triangle" for the many older gentlemen taking young ladies on dates at bars and restaurants. It has a structure designed by Birch Burdette Long, who was a Frank Lloyd Wright protege.

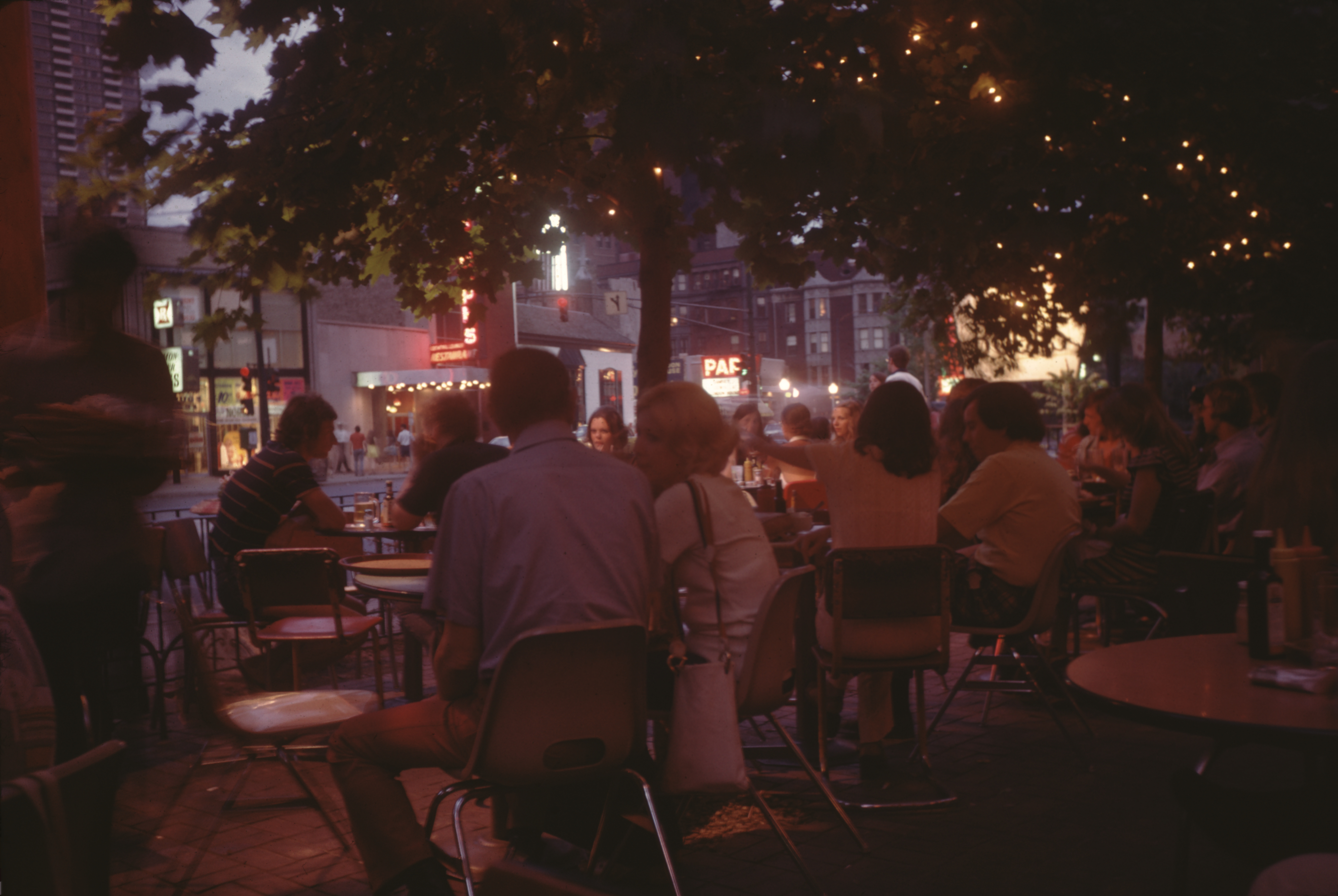
People at a restaurant by the park in 1972

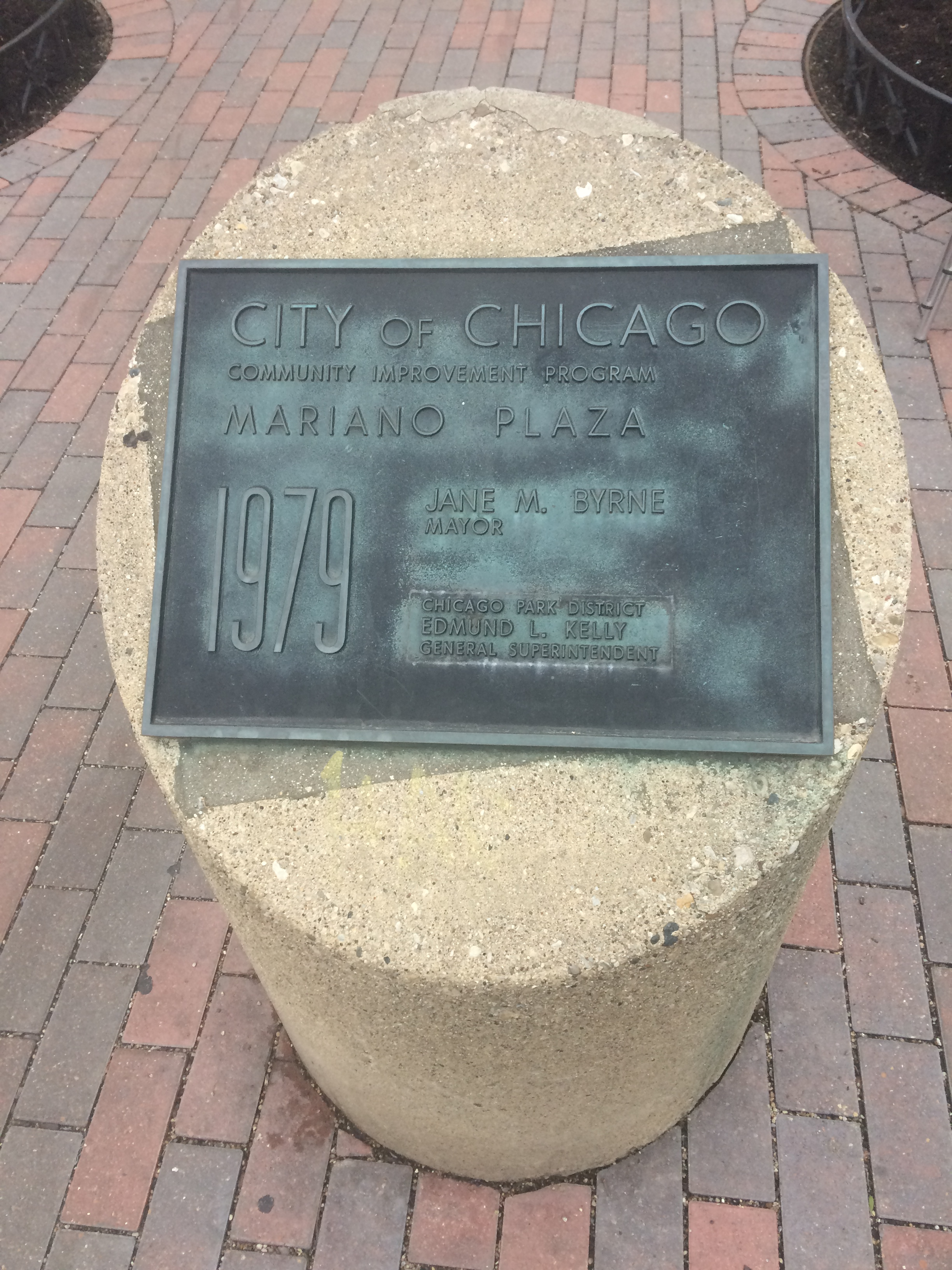
The name plaque at Mariano Plaza notes that Jane Byrne was mayor of Chicago at the time.

In 1970 Mariano Park was renamed for Louis Mariano, a reporter and editor for the Chicago Daily News. Mariano was an editor for World Book Encyclopedia and an associate editor for Science Year, the World Book Science Annual, as well as the assistant managing editor of the World Book Yearbook from 1963 through 1970. His column, "North Looping with Lou Mariano" featured happenings and local celebrities from the vantage point of his office, a table at O'Connell's Sandwich Shop on the corner of Bellevue and Rush Streets.

== See also ==
- List of Chicago parks
- Streeterville
