= Seward Park (Chicago) =

Park in Chicago, Illinois, U.S.

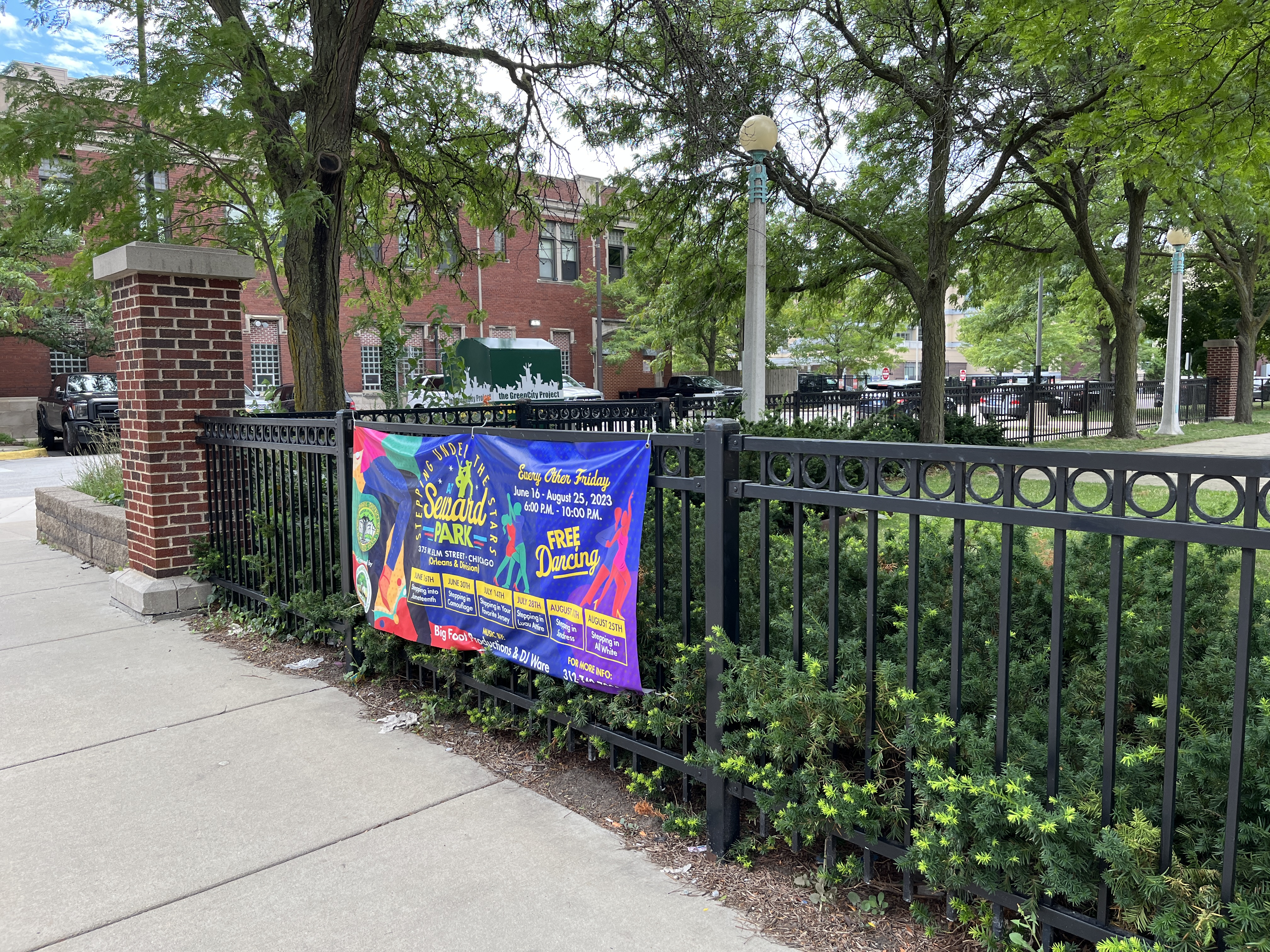
- Interactive map of Seward Park
- Location: Chicago, Illinois, U.S.
- Coordinates: 41°54′12″N 87°38′18″W

Seward Park is a public park in Old Town, Chicago, Illinois named after William H. Seward. The land for the park was acquired in 1907 and the park officially opened on July 4, 1908.

== History ==
People gathered in the park in 2020 to protest the murder of George Floyd. In July 2020, a film was screened in the park as part of the city's Movies in the Parks series. There have been shootings in the park, in 2018 and 2022. Brandon Johnson announced his mayoral campaign in Seward Park in 2022; he won election to the office of mayor.

== See also ==
- Parks in Chicago
- List of Chicago parks
