= Margaret Hie Ding Lin =

Chinese-American physician (1890–1973)

Sign for Margaret Hie Ding Lin Park, Chicago, 2026

Margaret Hie Ding Lin Park, 2026

Margaret Hie Ding Lin (March 17, 1890 or April 26, 1891–July 30, 1973) was a physician born in Fujian, China who emigrated to Illinois, United States.

According to a 1954 California newspaper account, Lin was "born in Foochow, the third child of the Rev. Nik Sing Lin, for 20 years minister in the American Born Mission at Foochow, and Mrs. Lin. Mrs. Lin, a teacher in primary school at the mission, was so disappointed because her third born was a girl that she insisted she be educated as a boy." Lin was brought to the U.S. at age 13 by "missionary guardians." Lin graduated from Foochow College, and was awarded a master's degree from Forest Park University in St. Louis, Missouri.

She studied medicine at the University of Illinois College of Medicine, graduating class of 1915. Her internship was at the Mary Thompson Hospital for Women and Children in Chicago. She was said to be the eighth Chinese woman of the modern era to earn a medical degree. Dr. Lin was the first woman to pass the Illinois state medical board exam.

She moved back to Fujian in 1917, where she helped build Fukien General Hospital. The hospital closed during the Chinese civil war in 1924. She then moved to Shanghai where she worked at the Red Cross Women and Children's Hospital. She worked in China for 22 years and specialized in female patients. She worked as a doctor in "battle zones" from 1932 to 1937. She moved back to the United States when the Japanese invaded in 1939. Between 1915 and 1939 she reportedly delivered approximately 6,500 babies.

In 1941 she was the first woman to be awarded an International College of Surgeons fellowship. She was named an assistant of clinical surgery by the University of Illinois. Lin was the first female staff doctor of the university medical school.

She was on the staff at Oak Forest Hospital beginning in 1943 under Dr. Eugene J. Chesrow. She and Dr. Janet Wang were photographed together as novel female doctors "from the Far East" in 1946. Lin became a naturalized citizen of the United States in 1954.

In Illinois she also worked at the Cook County Tuberculosis Hospital "and tended Chinatown patients during weekends." Lin was a member of the American Medical Association, the Women's Medical Association, and the Chicago Medical Society. Dr. Lin died in 1973 and was buried at Rosehill Cemetery in Chicago.

In 2004, Chicago's Park 360 was renamed to Margaret Hie Ding Lin Park in her honor. The basketball courts at the South Loop neighborhood park are a popular filming location, used for TV commercials featuring Michael Jordan and Derrick Rose, and a scene from The Bear season four.

== See also ==
- List of parks in Chicago
- Hü King Eng – Chinese doctor (1865–1929)
- Chi Che Wang – Chinese biochemist (1894–1979)
