= Jane Byrne Park =

Park in Chicago, Illinois, U.S.

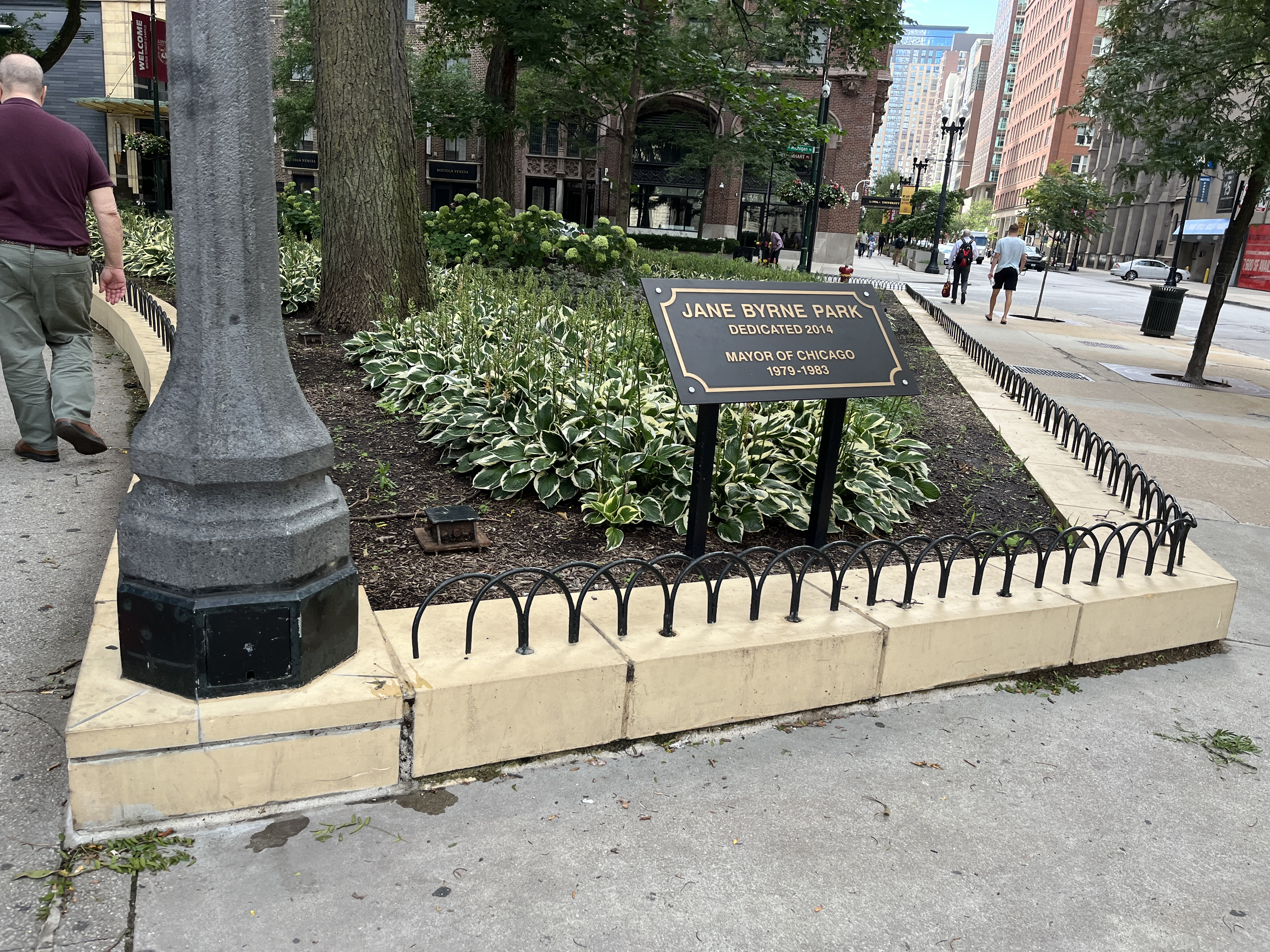
- Sign for the park, 2023
- Interactive map of Jane Byrne Park
- Location: Chicago, Illinois, U.S.
- Coordinates: 41°53′50″N 87°37′29″W

Jane Byrne Park is a park in Chicago, in the U.S. state of Illinois. It is adjacent to the Chicago Water Tower along Michigan Avenue. Previously known as Water Tower Park, the space was rededicated in 2014 to commemorate Jane Byrne. A statue of Mother Jones has been proposed for the park.
