= Lake Shore Park =

Park in Chicago, Illinois, U.S.

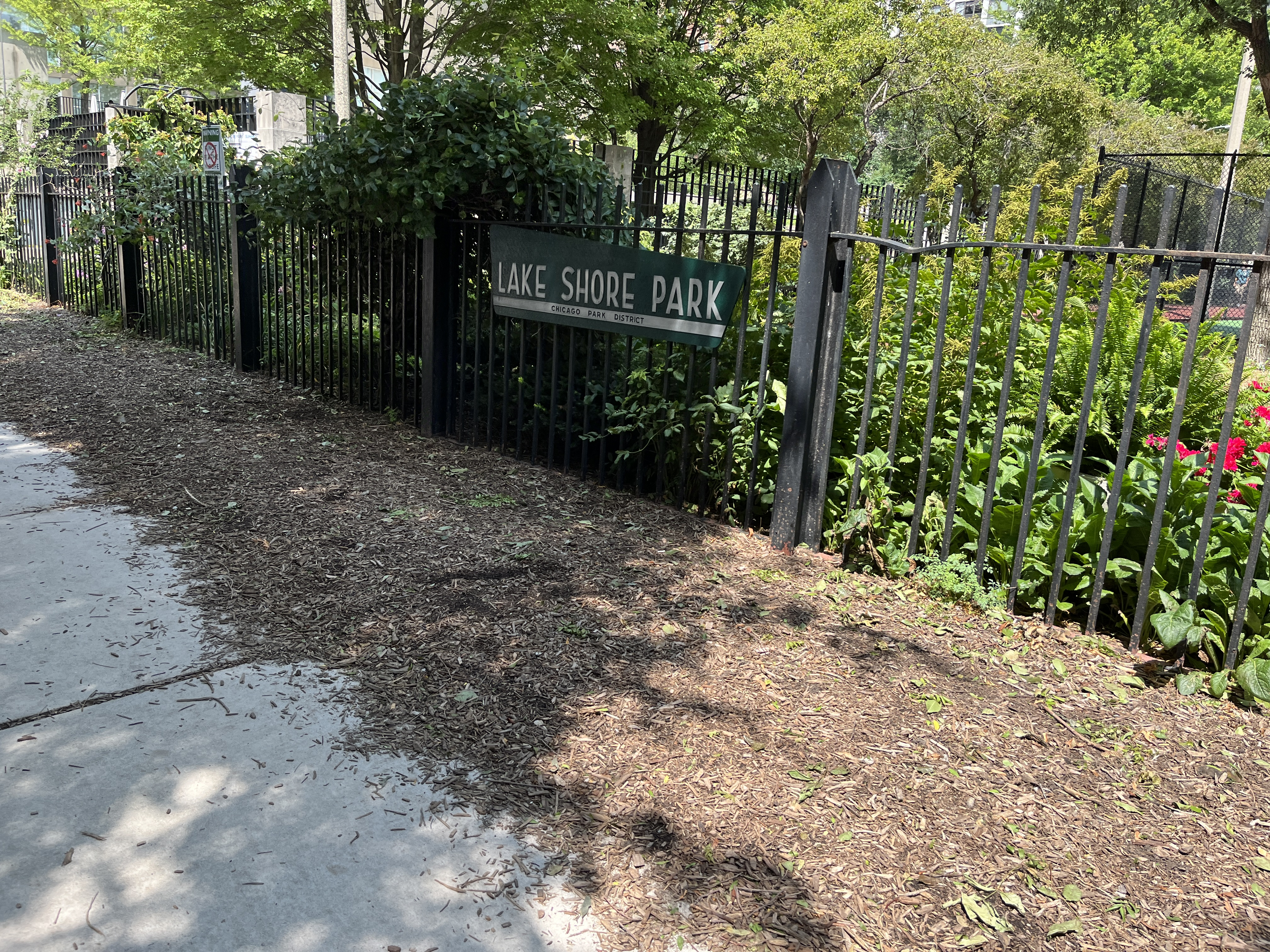
- Park sign, 2023
- Interactive map of Lake Shore Park
- Location: Chicago, Illinois, U.S.
- Coordinates: 41°53′50″N 87°37′9″W

Lake Shore Park is a public park in Chicago, in the U.S. state of Illinois.

== History and facilities ==
Lake Shore Park was planned by the Lincoln Park Commission before 1900 on land formed from former Lake Michigan dunes. The park now includes tennis courts, a running track, softball fields, a playground, a gymnasium and a fitness center. In 2022, an outdoor exercise area designed primarily for adults opened in the park.
