= Ogden Plaza Park =

Park in Chicago, Illinois, U.S.

- Interactive map of Ogden Plaza Park
- Location: Chicago, Illinois, U.S.
- Coordinates: 41°53′24″N 87°37′12″W
- Area: 1.38 acres (0.56 ha)

William Ogden Plaza Park is a 1.38-acre (0.56 ha) park in Streeterville, Chicago, in the U.S. state of Illinois. The park is named after William B. Ogden.

The land for the park was donated by the Chicago Dock and Canal Trust to the Chicago Park District in 1988 amid the Dock and Canal Trust's development of Cityfront Center. This was one of three parcels of land that the Dock and Canal Trust donated to the Chicago Park District in 1988 for the creation of new parks, the other two parcels being the land for River Esplanade Park and DuSable Park.

The park was designed in 1990 by Lohan Associates (a firm headed by Dirk Lohan). It is a multi-level plaza with benches. It features a large sculpture named Floor Clock II, designed by Vito Acconci.
