= Edison Park (Chicago park) =

- U.S. National Register of Historic Places
- U.S. Historic district
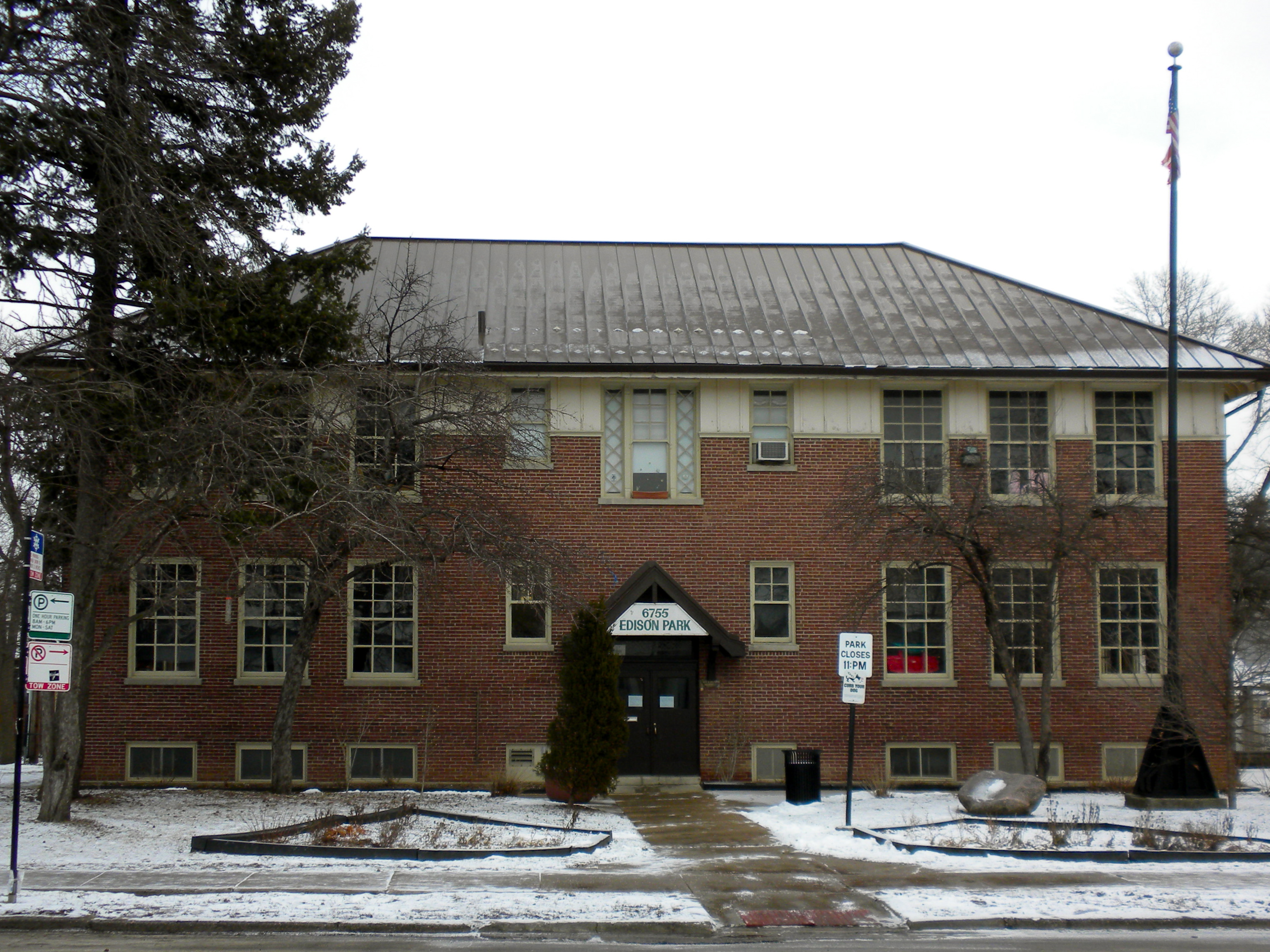
- The Edison Park fieldhouse

- Location within Chicago metropolitan area Location within Illinois Location within the United States
- Location: 6755 N. Northwest Hwy., Edison Park, Chicago, Illinois
- Coordinates: 42°0′14″N 87°49′3″W
- Area: 0.7 acres (0.28 ha)
- Architect: Multiple, including Solon S. Beman
- Architectural style: Arts and Crafts Movement
- MPS: Chicago Park District MPS
- NRHP reference No.: 07000990
- Added to NRHP: September 21, 2007

Edison Park is a park located in Edison Park community in Chicago, Illinois.

The park became part of the Chicago Park District in 1936. Edison Park's historic fieldhouse was built in 1907 as a public school. The fieldhouse was designed by Solon Spencer Beman in the Arts and Crafts style. A branch of the Chicago Public Library operated out of the fieldhouse from 1937 to 1960, and the building has also served as a community center.

The park contains hawthorn trees planted in the 1930s as well as a historic flagpole. In addition, the park contains a playground added in 1988, and a boulder honoring Thomas Edison dedicated in 1979. The park was added to the National Register of Historic Places on September 21, 2007.

== Community use ==
The fieldhouse serves as a neighborhood community and cultural-arts center. It hosts art classes and children’s programs, as well as activities for older residents. The Northwest Society of Model Railroaders also maintains a public model-train display in the building.
