= Gross Park =

Park in Chicago, Illinois, United States

Coordinates: 41.9424°N 87.6724°W

Gross Park is a public park in Lakeview, Chicago located at the 1700 West block of Henderson St between Paulina St and Ravenswood Ave. Its maintenance is shared between the Chicago Park District and Gross Park Neighbors Foundation, a 501(c)(3) nonprofit organization. Each summer the park hosts a Shakespeare in the Park event.

The park memorializes Samuel Eberly Gross, the property developer of the neighborhood in the 1880’s. He took inspiration from the boulevards of Europe and included a green space in his urban plan for the area, which at the time was outside of the urban area of Chicago.

In 1998, the invasive Asian long-horned beetle caused the loss of many trees in the park; the Chicago Park District and Gross Park Neighbors Foundation began restoration the following year. In 2008, the Illinois Department of Agriculture announced that it had eradicated the Asian long-horned beetle in Chicago.
