= Trumbull Park =

- U.S. National Register of Historic Places
- U.S. Historic district
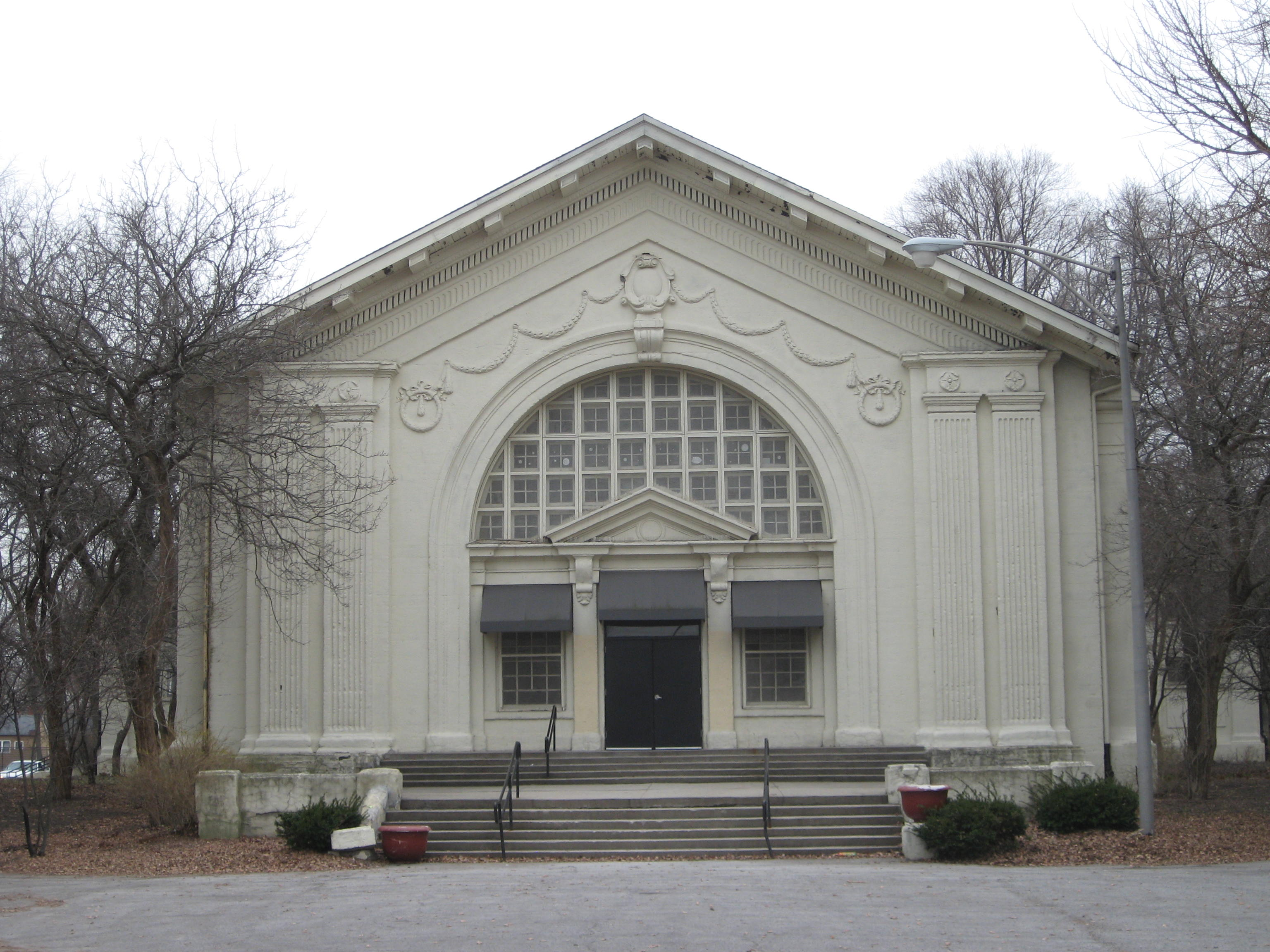

- Location within Chicago metropolitan area Location within Illinois Location within the United States
- Location: 2400 E. 105th St., Chicago, Illinois
- Coordinates: 41°42′23″N 87°33′52″W
- Area: 18.5 acres (7.5 ha)
- Architect: South Park Commission
- Architectural style: Beaux Arts
- MPS: Chicago Park District MPS
- NRHP reference No.: 95000486
- Added to NRHP: April 20, 1995

Trumbull Park is a public park at 2400 E. 105th Street in the South Deering neighborhood of Chicago, Illinois. The South Park Commission opened the park in 1907 as part of its efforts to bring parks to dense immigrant neighborhoods with little green space. The park's fieldhouse and other facilities were not completed until the 1910s; around this time, the park was officially named for Lyman Trumbull, a United States senator from Illinois who co-wrote the Thirteenth Amendment. While the park and its facilities were designed in-house by the South Park Commission, they were inspired by the designs of landscape architects the Olmsted Brothers and architecture firm D. H. Burnham and Company used in many of the South Park Commission's other parks. The fieldhouse in particular has a Beaux-Arts design which calls back to Burnham's work for the 1893 Columbian Exposition.

The park was added to the National Register of Historic Places on April 20, 1995.
