= River Esplanade Park =

Park in Chicago, Illinois, U.S.

- Interactive map of River Esplanade Park
- Location: Chicago, Illinois, U.S.
- Coordinates: 41°53′20″N 87°37′3″W
- Area: 1.12 acres (0.45 ha)

River Esplanade Park is a 1.12-acre (0.45 ha) park in Chicago, in the U.S. state of Illinois.

The park features Centennial Fountain, which was designed by Lohan Associates (a firm headed by Dirk Lohan).

The land for the park was one of three parcels of land that the Chicago Dock and Canal Trust (developers of Cityfront Center) donated to the Chicago Park District in 1988 for the creation of new parks. The other two parcels were the land for Ogden Plaza Park and DuSable Park.
