= Chicago Riot Rugby Football Club =

American rugby union team

(United States) Chicago Riot Rugby
- Full name: Chicago Riot Rugby Football Club
- Union: Chicago Area Rugby Football Union (CARFU)
- Nickname: Riot
- Founded: 2006
- Ground(s): Smith Park, Chicago, Illinois, United States
- President: Jeremy Gram
- Coach(es): Dan Matuz, Spyridon Alexopoulos
- Captain: Blair Rush

The Chicago Riot Rugby Football Club is a Division II rugby union team based out of Chicago, Illinois, United States. It is a member of the Chicago Area Rugby Football Union and the Midwest Rugby Football Union. The Riot play league matches throughout Illinois, as well as numerous tournaments and friendly matches in the Midwest.

== History ==
The Chicago Riot Rugby Football Club was formed in 2006 by a group of University of Illinois-Chicago (UIC) alumni. The club was formed to embrace the social aspects of the sport, along with offering a competitive atmosphere to contend on the rugby pitch.

=== 2024 regular season (D3) ===
August 24, 2024	Northwest Indiana Reapers	3 - 34	(1 BP) Chicago Riot	Riverside Park

September 7, 2024	Chicago Riot (1 BP)	10 - 12	Chicago Silverbacks	Smith Park

September 14, 2024	Chicago Riot (1 BP)	27 - 26	(2 BP) Northwest Woodsmen	Smith Park

September 21, 2024	Chicago Riot (1 BP)	12 - 16	Chicago (Lemont) Blaze	Smith Park

September 28, 2024	Rockford Ravens	7 - 38	(1 BP) Chicago Riot	Lyran Park

October 5, 2024	Peoria Pigs (1 BP)	22 - 63	(1 BP) Chicago Riot	Catholic Charities Field

October 12, 2024	Chicago Riot (1 BP)	34 - 17	Lake County Coyotes	Smith Park

=== 2024 playoffs (D3) ===
October 19, 2024	Fox Cities Gargoyles	27 - 31	Chicago Riot	Greenville Lions Park

October 26, 2024	Northwest Woodsmen	24 - 44	Chicago Riot	Busse Woods

October 19, 2024	Chicago Riot	13 - 19	Red River Ruffians	Wisconsin Rugby Club

== Home Grounds ==
The Riot conducts training and all home matches at Smith Park in Chicago.
