= Addams Memorial Park =

Park in Chicago, Illinois, U.S.

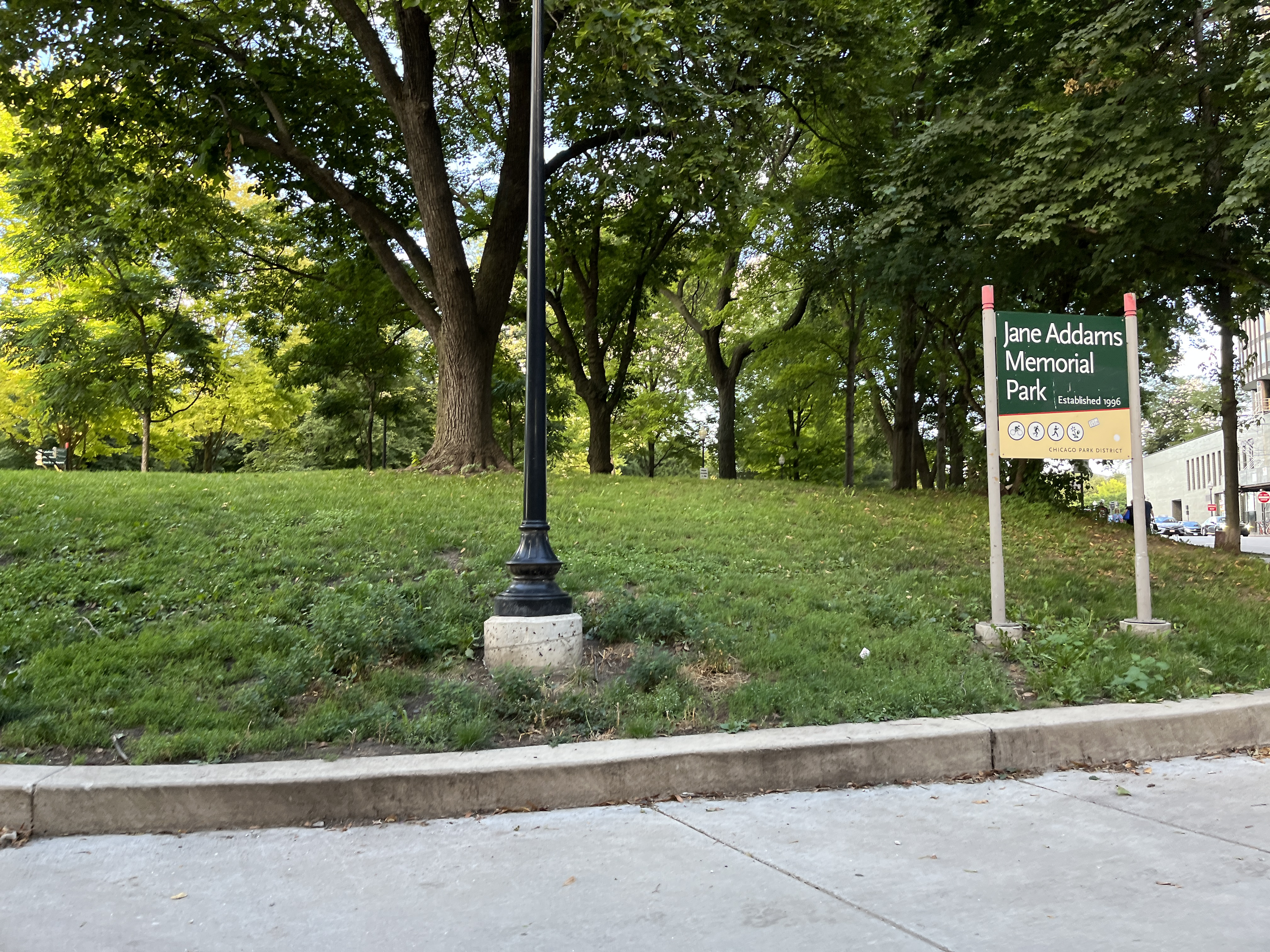
- Park sign, 2023
- Interactive map of Addams Memorial Park
- Location: Chicago, Illinois, U.S.
- Coordinates: 41°53′33″N 87°36′46″W

Jane Addams Memorial Park is a public park in Chicago, in the U.S. state of Illinois. Located near Navy Pier, the park is named after Jane Addams, the first woman to be awarded the Nobel Peace Prize.

The park has featured a monument designed by Louise Bourgeois.
