= Pulaski Road (Chicago) =

Major street in Chicago, Illinois, U.S.

Coordinates: 41°52′27.3″N 87°43′31.5″W

- Casimir Pulaski Memorial Road; Crawford Avenue; 4000 West
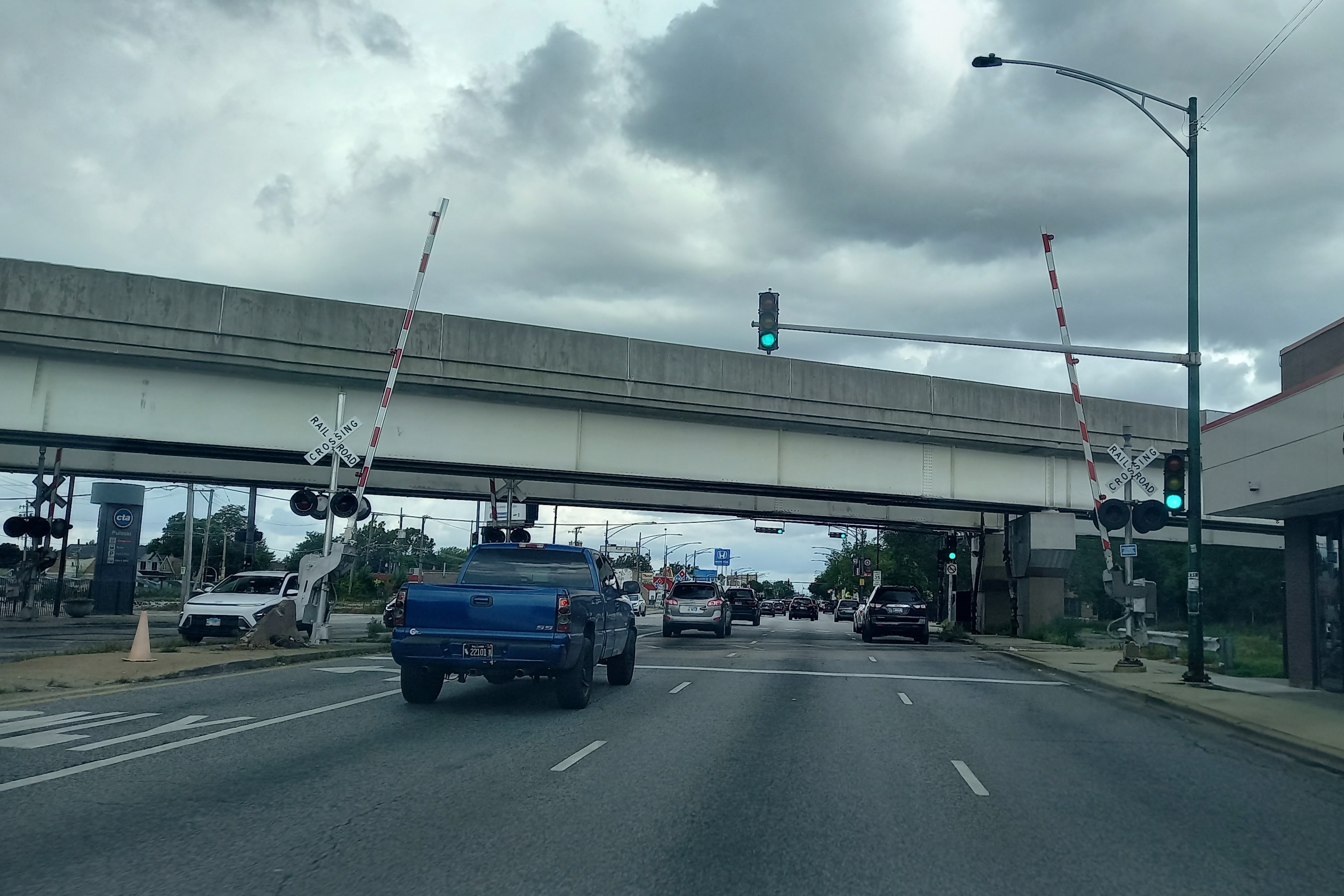
- Pulaski Road at the CTA Orange Line overpass
- Interactive map of Pulaski Road
- Former name: 40th Avenue
- Length: 39.3 mi (63.2 km)
- South end: Lincoln Highway (21100 S) in Matteson
- North end: Wilmette Avenue in Wilmette

Pulaski Road (/pəˈlæskiː/) is a major north–south street in the city of Chicago, at 4000 W., or exactly five miles west of State Street. It is named after Casimir Pulaski, a Polish hero of the American Revolutionary War.

== History ==
Pulaski Road was originally known as 40th Avenue. In 1913 it was renamed for Peter Crawford, an early area landowner, in order to avoid duplication of the 40th Street name in the city. The name Crawford Avenue lasted until 1935 when, over local opposition and a legal battle all the way to the Illinois Supreme Court, the street was renamed for Pulaski. Opposition continued, and a 1952 Illinois Supreme Court ruling ended an effort to force the city to restore the Crawford Avenue name. Among the many Polish city leaders who worked to achieve "Pulaski Road" was Emilia Napieralska, the president of the Polish Women's Alliance of America.

Pulaski Road still retains its former Crawford Avenue name in the north suburbs of Lincolnwood, Skokie, and Evanston. In Wilmette, Crawford becomes Hunter Road. North of Devon Avenue (6400 N) and south from the Chicago City Limits to Lincoln Highway US-30.

== Chicago neighborhoods and suburbs ==
From north to south:

- Wilmette (Suburb)
- Evanston (Suburb)
- Skokie (Suburb)
- Lincolnwood (Suburb)
- Forest Glen (City of Chicago)
- North Park (City of Chicago)
- Albany Park (City of Chicago)
- Irving Park (City of Chicago)
- Avondale (City of Chicago)
- Logan Square (City of Chicago)
- Hermosa (City of Chicago)
- Humboldt Park (City of Chicago)
- West Garfield Park (City of Chicago)
- North Lawndale (City of Chicago)
- South Lawndale (City of Chicago)
- Archer Heights (City of Chicago)
- West Elsdon (City of Chicago)
- West Lawn (City of Chicago)
- Ashburn (City of Chicago)
- Hometown (Suburb)
- Evergreen Park (Suburb)
- Oak Lawn (Suburb)
- Mount Greenwood (City of Chicago)
- Alsip (Suburb)
- Robbins (Suburb)
- Crestwood (Suburb)
- Midlothian (Suburb)
- Markham (Suburb)
- Country Club Hills (Suburb)
- Hazel Crest (Suburb)
- Olympia Fields (Suburb)
- Matteson (Suburb)

== Transportation ==
Pulaski Road is primarily served by two CTA bus routes: the 53 Pulaski between Peterson Avenue and Ford City Mall, and the 53A South Pulaski, between 51st Street and 115th Street. The 67 67th/69th/71st and 103 West 103rd also serve the road for short segments. Pulaski Road/Crawford Avenue is also served by Pace bus routes 215 and 385.

The following CTA Lines stop at Pulaski Road:

- Green Line at Lake Street
- Blue Line at Congress Parkway
- Pink Line at Cullerton Street
- Orange Line at 51st Street

The Irving Park station on the Blue Line has an auxiliary exit on Pulaski Road. Additionally, the Healy station on Metra's Milwaukee District North Line is adjacent to Pulaski Road.

== Points of interest ==
- Bohemian National Cemetery is located on Pulaski between Bryn Mawr and Foster.
- The 17th District of the Chicago Police Department is located at 4650 North Pulaski Road.
- Pulaski passes through the Villa District between Avondale and Addison streets.
- Pulaski runs through Chicago's Polish Village, the famous "Polish Patches of Jackowo and Wacławowo at Milwaukee Avenue.
- Caryl Yasko's famous mural, Razem, Chicago's only outdoor Polish-themed mural, is located on Belmont Avenue just west of its intersection with Pulaski. It combines Polish patriotic and folkloric motifs with American Street Art.
- Pulaski ran past the site of one of Chicago's Seven Lost Wonders, the Olson Park and Waterfall complex which was located at the northwest corner of Pulaski and Diversey.
- Located off West End and Pulaski, Chicago Fire Department Engine 95's station is located off 4001 West West End Avenue.
- The Henry E. Legler Regional Branch of the Chicago Public Library is near Monroe Street. a building on the National Register of Historic Places.
- At Archer Avenue (approximately 50th Street), Pulaski passes by Curie Metro High School, named for another famous Pole as well as the Polish Highlanders Alliance of North America nearby.
- The corner of 63rd and Pulaski is known for a giant Native American statue on top of a cigar store that has been converted into an optometrist.
- At 65th Street sits the Balzekas Museum of Lithuanian Culture, and at 75th Street is Richard J. Daley College, one of the City Colleges of Chicago.
- Brother Rice High School is at 100th Street.
- At 111th Street sits the campus of the Chicago High School for Agricultural Sciences, home to the last remaining farm within the Chicago city limits, which stretches south to 115th.

A number of prominent Polish churches in Chicago are located on side streets just off of Pulaski Road, such as St. Hyacinth Basilica and St. Wenceslaus.

== Major intersections ==
The entire route is in Cook County.

Location	mi	km	Destinations	Notes
Matteson–Olympia Fields line	0.0	0.0	US 30 / Lincoln Highway	Southern terminus
Flossmoor	2.5	4.0	CR B65 (Flossmoor Road)	
Markham	6.8	10.9	US 6 (159th Street) to I-57	
Midlothian	8.3	13.4	IL 83 (147th Street)	
Alsip	10.82	17.41	127th Street to I-294 Toll	
Oak Lawn–Evergreen Park line	14.8	23.8	US 12 / US 20 (95th Street)	
Chicago	22.0	35.4	I-55 (Stevenson Expressway)	
Chicago	23.9	38.5	Historic US 66 (Ogden Avenue)	
Chicago	27.9	44.9	IL 64 (West North Avenue)	
Chicago	30.9	49.7	I-90 / I-94 east (Kennedy Expressway)	Eastbound I 90/I 94 entrance; westbound I 90/I 94 exit
Chicago	31.0	49.9	IL 19 (West Irving Park Road) to I-90 / I-94 west (Kennedy Expressway)	
Chicago	33.5	53.9	US 14 (West Peterson Avenue)	
Lincolnwood	34.5	55.5	US 41 (Lincoln Avenue)	
Wilmette	39.3	63.2	Wilmette Avenue	Northern terminus; roadway continues as Hunter Road
1.000 mi = 1.609 km; 1.000 km = 0.621 mi: Incomplete access
