= Hairpin Arts Center =

Community art center in Chicago, Illinois

The Hairpin Arts Center is a community art center in the historic Morris B. Sachs building within the Chicago Community Area of Avondale. The space is managed by the Logan Square Chamber of Arts, a 501(c)(3) not-for-profit established in 2009.

== Branches ==
The Hairpin Art Center is organized into Six Branches

- Visual Arts: Exhibitions, live painting events, mural projects, and more.
- Tech Arts: Interactive installations, VR/AR showcases, and digital design workshops.
- Performing Arts: Theater, music, spoken word, dance, and beyond.
- Functional Arts: Handcrafted objects, ceramics, textiles, and other practical art forms.
- Cultural Arts: Celebrations of diverse traditions, community festivals, and global heritage events.
- Healing Arts: Sound meditations, holistic therapies, and mindfulness-based creative practices.

Each Branch is led by a director who holds monthly committee meetings to discuss and plan exhibitions and various programming to support the mission.

== Location ==
The Hairpin is located at the intersection of Milwaukee Avenue, Kimball Avenue, and Diversey Parkway in the former Morris B. Sachs building—an iconic flatiron structure that is part of the Milwaukee-Diversey-Kimball District. This 8,000-square-foot second floor serves as a community art center, providing performance and exhibit space with multiple stage configurations, a classroom, a recording studio and a hospitality center to gather. The renovations were supported through a grant from the Illinois Arts Council. The space provides an opportunity for live music, theater, dance, tech installations, film, and poetry performances and more.

== History ==
The space is managed by the Logan Square Chamber of Arts, a 501(c)(3) not-for-profit established in 2009. The organization was the first Chamber of Arts to be created in the city of Chicago. It was formed as an organizing body to implement the Quality-of-Life-Plan arts strategies drafted through a community wide task force as part of the LISC/Chicago New Communities Program. The master plans calls for the chamber to establish sustainable partnerships with artists and arts organizations of various disciplines, and to assist with the production and presentation of their work by providing space, resources and time.

== Morris B. Sachs Building ==
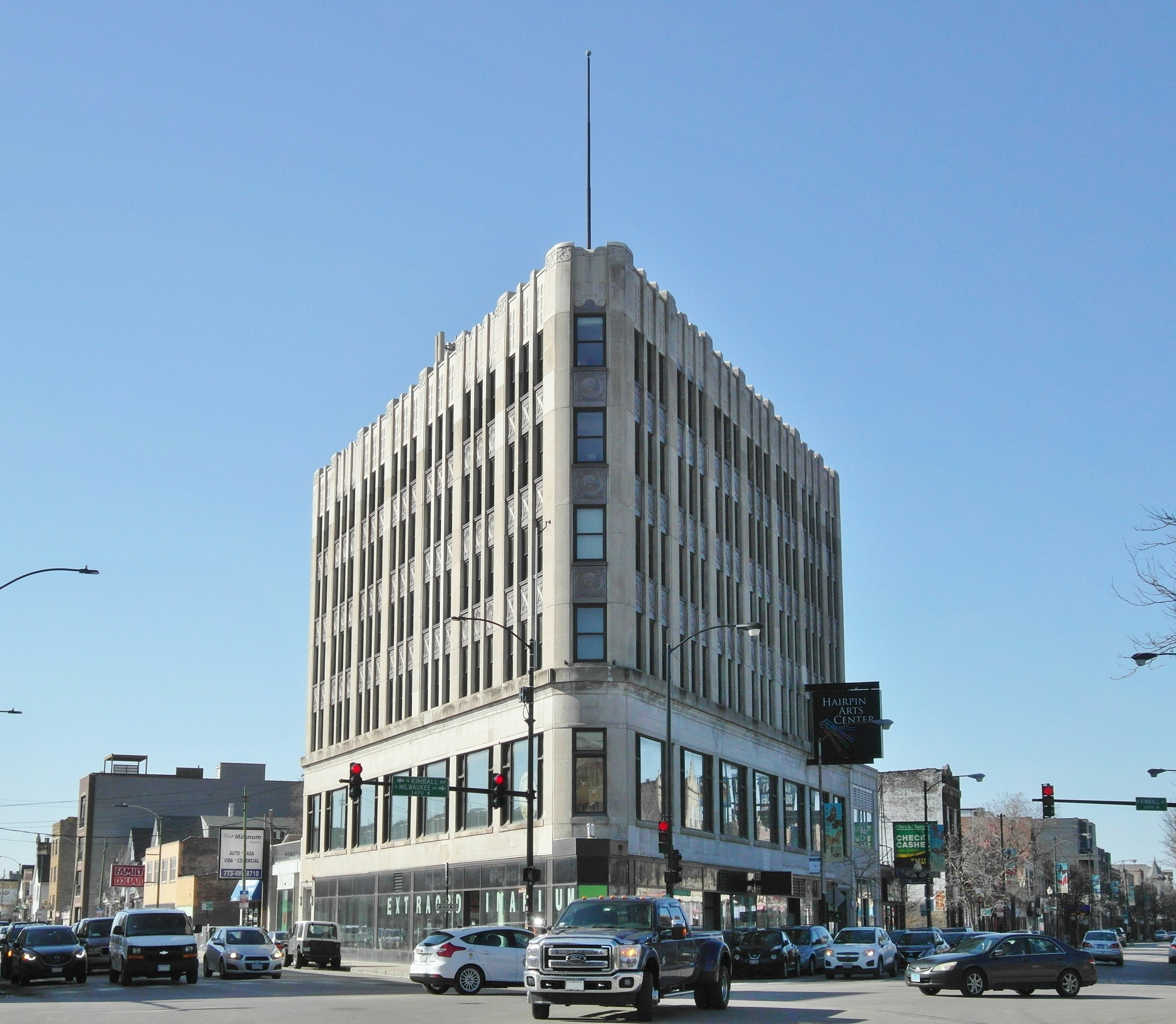
The Morris B. Sachs Building

This office and retail building was designed by the firm of Leichenko and Esser, the design team that executed the Narragansett Apartments in the lakefront neighborhood of Hyde Park. The camel insignia that abundantly decorates the building's exterior is a version of the logo that decorated Hump Hair Pin packages, which is why local Poles colloquially referred to the structure as "pod wielbłądem," which translates into English as "the building beneath the camel". Colloquially known as "the Hump building", it was built in 1930 for Sol Goldberg, an entrepreneur who made his fortune by redesigning the hairpin. Goldberg's "hair pin with the hump" was a U-shaped wire with a "non-rust satin enamel finish," a few crinkles on each side, and the company's signature innovation: a strand-grabbing short third arm in the center.

Goldberg survived the bobbed hair trend by creating a bobby pin, but by 1947 the Hump was home to the Morris B. Sachs department store, part of the chain started by another colorful Chicagoan, a onetime door-to-door salesman. The store closed in the 1960s, and the building passed through several subsequent owners.

After being mostly empty for at least the last two decades, the recurring camel motif on the facade and the lobby floor has been restored as the building is now part of an official Landmark District of the City of Chicago.
