= Avondale, Chicago =

Community area in Chicago, Illinois

Avondale
- Community area
- Community Area 21 - Avondale
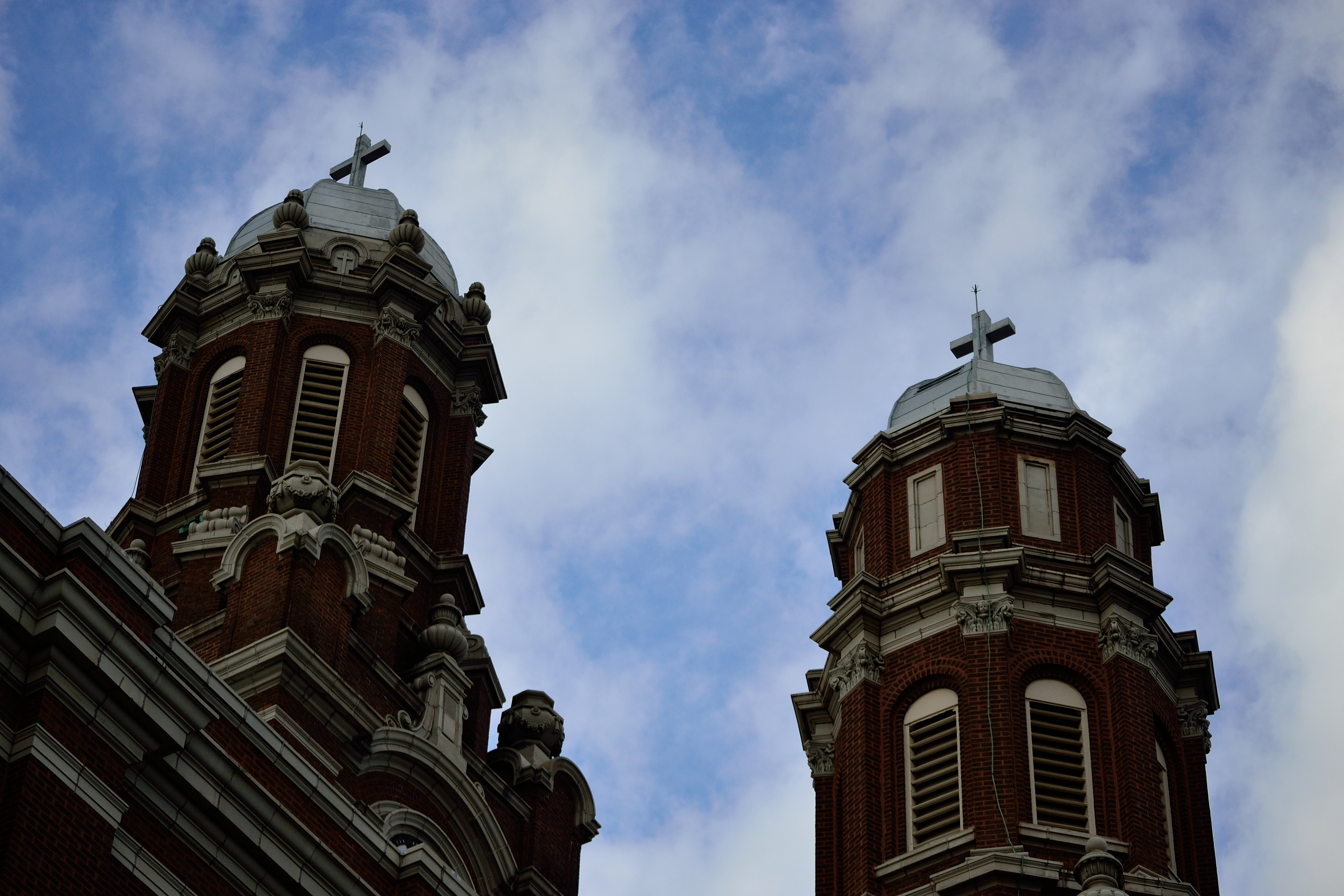
- St. Hyacinth Basilica towers over the Avondale neighborhood.

- Location within the city of Chicago
- Coordinates: 41°56.4′N 87°42.6′W
- Country: United States
- State: Illinois
- County: Cook
- City: Chicago
- Neighborhoods: List: Avondale; Kosciuszko Park; Jackowo; Wacławowo

Area
  - Total: 2.00 sq mi (5.18 km^{2})

Population (2024)
  - Total: 35,533
  - Density: 17,800/sq mi (6,860/km^{2})

Demographics 2024
  - White: 37.9%
  - Black: 3.2%
  - Hispanic: 49.7%
  - Asian: 4.2%
  - Other: 5.0%
- Time zone: UTC-6 (CST)
  - Summer (DST): UTC-5 (CDT)
- ZIP Codes: 60618
- Median household income: $92,645
- Source: U.S. Census, Record Information Services

Avondale (/ˈævəndeɪl/) is one of the 77 community areas of Chicago in Illinois, United States. It is on the Northwest Side of the city. The northern border is Addison Street from the north branch of the Chicago River in the east to Pulaski Road in the west. The neighborhood extends further west along Belmont Avenue to the Milwaukee District North Line. Its southern border is Diversey Avenue from the Milwaukee District North Line to the Chicago River.

In 2025, Avondale was ranked the world's fifth coolest neighborhood by Time Out, higher than any other U.S. city. This represents an increase in ranking from 2022, when Time Out ranked Avondale the sixteenth coolest neighborhood in the world.

== History ==
The first European settler in Avondale was Abraham Harris who settled the area three years after its 1850 incorporation into Jefferson Township. In 1869, Avondale was incorporated as a village. It has been speculated that developer and Pennsylvania native John Lewis Cochran named the village in honor of the miners and rescue workers who died in the Avondale coal mine fire. Atypical for the time, Avondale was racially integrated in the nineteenth century with twenty African American families moving to the area and building Avondale's first church in the 1880s. Avondale, along with the rest of Jefferson Township, was annexed by the City of Chicago in 1889.

Factories and other industries sprang up around the start of the 20th century due to the Chicago River and Avondale's dense network of transportation corridors that were built in the 1870s and improved after its annexation into Chicago including replacement of cable cars with electric powered streetcars. The resulting jobs in the area were responsible for drawing the initial wave of European immigrants.

Avondale was the site of what the Chicago Tribune called one of Chicago's "Seven Lost Wonders", the Olson Park and Waterfall complex at Diversey and Pulaski.

In the 1980s, Latino settlement began in Avondale. People of various Eastern European ethnicities came to the area following the End of Communism in 1989, leading to Avondale's nickname as the neighborhood "Where Eastern Europe meets Latin America".

Starting in the mid-2000s, gentrification began to take hold in the Avondale area as it had in neighboring Wicker Park, Logan Square and Bucktown.

== Demographics ==
Historical population
Census	Pop.	Note	%±
1930	48,433		—
1940	47,684		−1.5%
1950	45,313		−5.0%
1960	39,748		−12.3%
1970	35,714		−10.1%
1980	33,527		−6.1%
1990	35,579		6.1%
2000	43,085		21.1%
2010	39,262		−8.9%
2020	36,257		−7.7%

Poles first moved into Avondale beginning in the 1890s. Historian Edward Kantowicz states that the neighborhood's position along Milwaukee Avenue between the earlier Polish neighborhood known as Polish Downtown and St. Adalbert Cemetery in Niles, Illinois led to later Polish settlement in this area. The collapse of Communism in Eastern Europe witnessed an influx of Eastern European immigrants such as Czechs, Slovaks, Ukrainians and Belarusians, particularly alongside Poles in the "Polish Village". The emigration of peoples from the Soviet Bloc in Avondale since then has grown to include Russophone nationals from Central Asia and Mongolia. A Filipino community is present in Avondale as well, which is home to Chicago's Filipino TV outlet. Latino settlement beginning in the 1980s led to an increase in Avondale's Hispanic population from 37.6% in 1990 to 62.0% in 2000, with increased numbers of Mexicans, Puerto Ricans, and Central American immigrants.

== Transportation ==
Avondale is served by the 'L' at two stations along the Blue Line. The Belmont station is on the northeastern edge next to the Kennedy Expressway at the intersection of Kimball Avenue and Belmont, less than three blocks away from St. Hyacinth's former mission of Our Lady of Lourdes; the Addison station is located in the median of the same expressway adjacent to the neighboring Villa District.

Avondale is also accessible by a number of bus routes run by the CTA.

- Running Northwest/ Southeast:
  - 56 Milwaukee
- Running North/ South:
  - 49 Western
  - 53 Pulaski
  - 82 Kimball-Homan
  - 93 California-Dodge
  - 94 California
- Running East/ West:
  - 76 Diversey
  - 77 Belmont
  - 152 Addison

== Neighborhoods ==
=== Polish Village ===
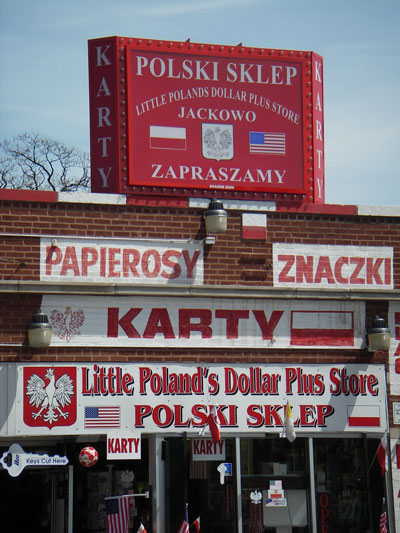
Polish store on Milwaukee Avenue

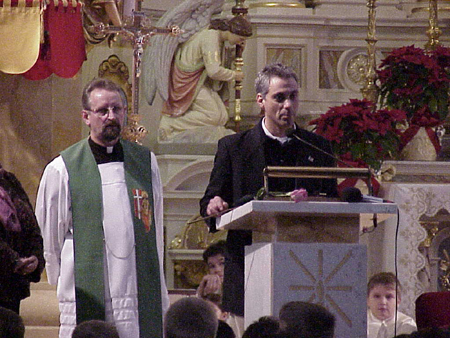
Rahm Emanuel speaking at St. Hyacinth Basilica.

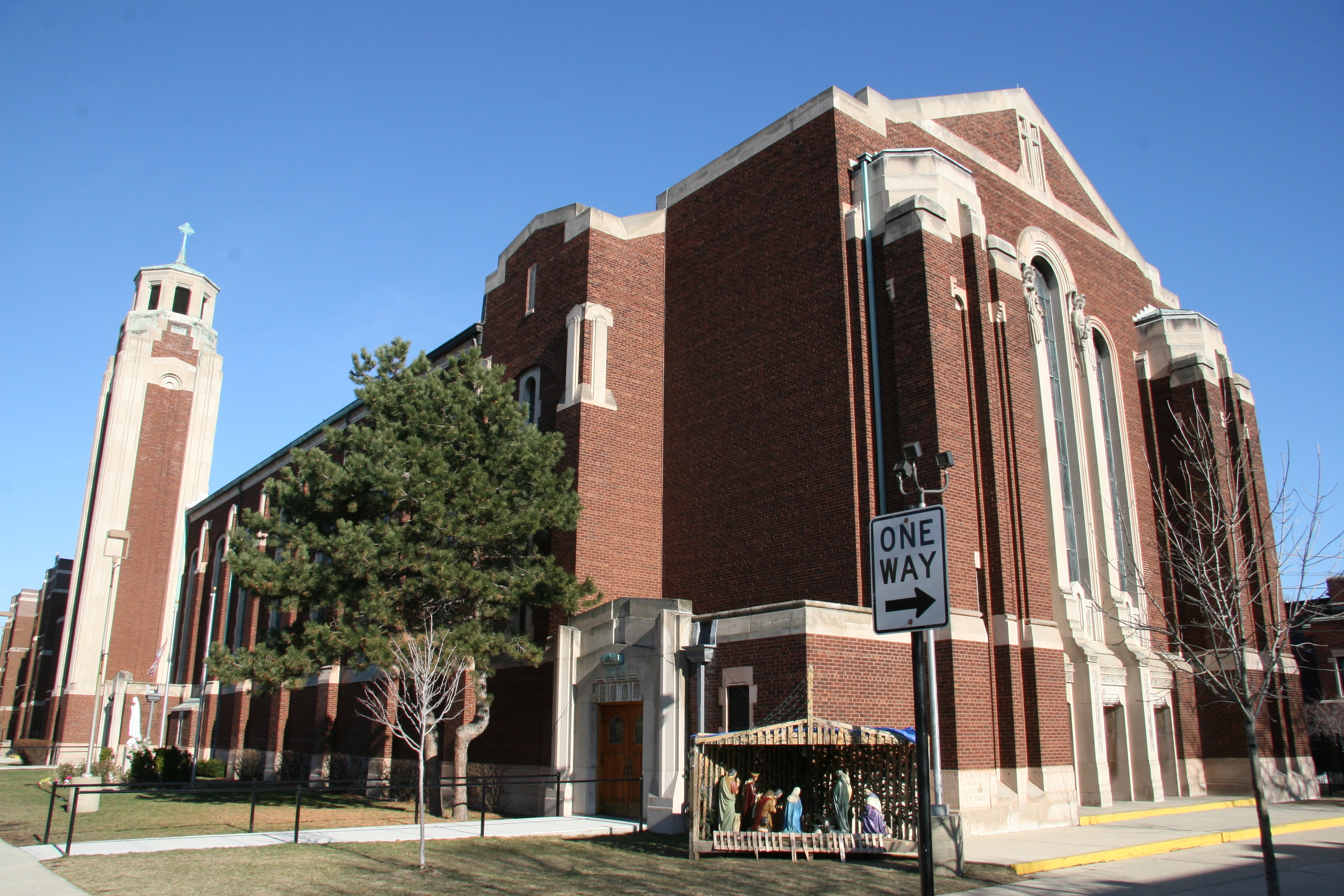
Wacławowo is derived from the Polish name for the church of St. Wenceslaus.

The Polish Village or Jackowo [jat͡sˈkɔvɔ] and Wacławowo [vat͡swaˈvɔvɔ], together make up one of Chicago's largest Polish Patches. The neighborhoods derive their Polish names from the two contiguous Polish Roman Catholic parishes- Saint Hyacinth's Basilica (Bazylika Św. Jacka) and St. Wenceslaus Church (Kościół Świętego Wacława). In English the area is usually referred to as the Polish Village - the name featured on signs hung on street lamps over the district.Milwaukee Avenue is the district's main commercial strip. Pulaski Road, named after the Polish Revolutionary War hero Casimir Pulaski, runs through the area.

The Polish communities of Jackowo and Wacławowo appeared in the late 19th and early 20th centuries as Polish settlement spread further northwest along Milwaukee Avenue. Polish immigration to the area continued during and after the Solidarity movement in the 1980s. Until the installation of an automated system, on Sunday mornings the CTA driver would announce “Jackowo” signaling the stop for St. Hyacinth Basilica as Poles shuttled off the bus on their way to Mass. The historic Milford Theatre served as the central Polish cinema arts venue like Jefferson Park's Gateway Theater later, with locals giving it the nickname "Cinema Polski". The website of street photographer Vivian Maier notes her visits to the Milford Theatre.

A mural in an Avondale McDonald's parking lot combining Polish patriotic and folkloric motifs by Caryl Yasko titled "Razem", or together in Polish, was painted thanks in part to funds furnished by the Polish American Congress in 1975. The mural, near the intersection of Belmont and Pulaski Avenues, is severely eroded as of 2009.

=== Kosciuszko Park ===
Kosciuszko Park is the neighborhood around the park of the same name, named for Tadeusz Kościuszko, a Polish soldier who served as general in the American Revolutionary War. The neighborhood is known by the nicknames "Koz Park" and "The Land of Koz". The boundaries of Kosciuszko Park are Central Park Avenue to the east, the Milwaukee District North Line railroad tracks to west, George Street to the north, and Altgeld Street to the south. Most of this area is in the Logan Square community area, with the portion north of Diversey Avenue lying in Avondale.

== Economy ==
In 1937, Dad's Root Beer was founded in Avondale by Ely Klapman and Barney Berns. The company operated a bottling plant in the community before the company moved operations. The factory has since been converted into condominiums.

As of 2014, the top 5 employing industry sectors in Avondale are retail trade (20.9%), manufacturing (14.8%), utilities (12.4%), accommodation and food service (9.8%), and finance (7.4%). Over half of these workers come from outside of Chicago and 45.5% come from outside of Avondale within the city. The top 5 employing industry sectors of community residents are accommodation and food service (11.5%), healthcare (11%), professional (10.1%), retail trade (9.6%), and administration (8.3%).

== Education ==
Avondale area schools include Carl Von Linne School at 3221 N. Sacramento and Avondale Logandale Elementary School at 3212 W. George St., both part of Chicago Public Schools, and the Carlos Fuentes School operated by the United Neighborhood Organization

== Politics ==
The Avondale community area has supported the Democratic Party in the past two presidential elections. In the 2016 presidential election, Avondale cast 10,290 votes for Hillary Clinton and cast 1,345 votes for Donald Trump (83.77% to 10.95%). In the 2012 presidential election, Avondale cast 7,940 votes for Barack Obama and 1,415 votes for Mitt Romney (82.43% to 14.69%).

== Parks ==
Avondale was cited by the Chicago Tribune as being in the top tier of Chicago's "park poor" neighborhoods. This situation was further aggravated when Avondale Park was reduced to just over one acre in size during the building of the Kennedy Expressway, taking over most of its green space, including the park's playfield, separate boys' and girls' playgrounds, a wading pool, a sand box and tennis courts while leaving the fieldhouse designed by Clarence Hatzfeld intact.

Parks in the Avondale community area include Brands Park and Avondale Park, Grape Playlot, Park-view Playlot, Nelson Playlot, Elston Playlot, and Sacramento Playlot.

== Culture ==
Avondale is home to the second location of the Puerto Rican Arts Alliance in the former firehouse of Engine 91. The Hairpin Arts Center is located in Avondale near its border with Logan Square.

== Notable people ==
- Lucy Parsons, labor organizer and founder of Industrial Workers of the World. She perished in a fire in Avondale in 1942.
- Carlos Ramirez-Rosa, member of the Chicago City Council representing the 35th Ward and the first openly gay, Latino alderman. He is a resident of Avondale.
- Louise Schaaf (1906–2020), supercentenarian notable for being, at the time of her death, the oldest person in Illinois and the oldest known person born in Germany. She resided near Belmont and California in Avondale until 1959 when she moved to the Norwood Park neighborhood.
- Steve Stanlee and Gene Stanlee - professional wrestlers.

== See also ==
- Polish Cathedral style
- Polish American
