= Avondale Park (Chicago) =

Park in Chicago, Illinois, United States

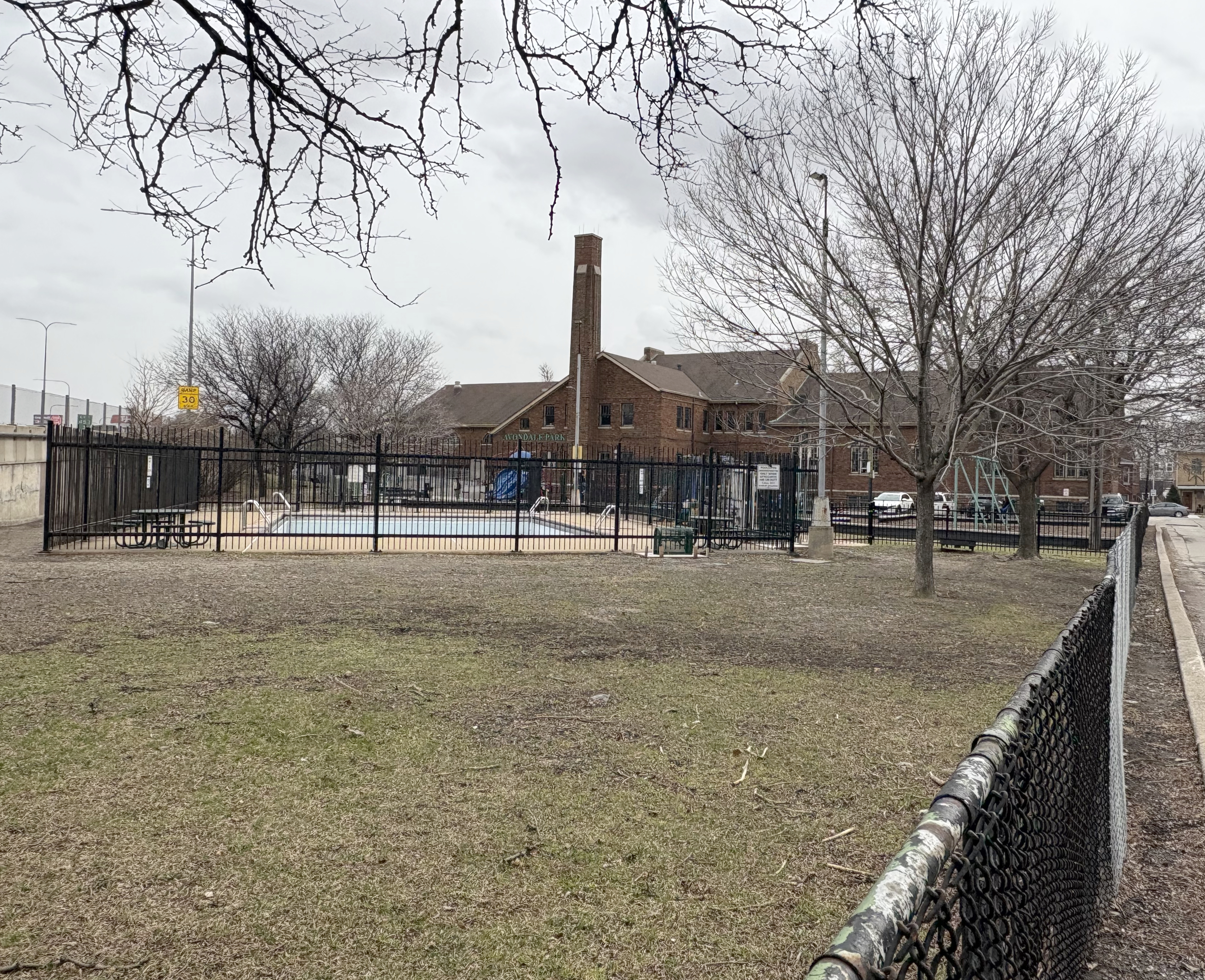
- The park in 2025
- Interactive map of Avondale Park
- Type: Municipal park
- Location: 3516 W. School Street, Chicago, Illinois, U.S.
- Coordinates: 41°56′29″N 87°42′55″W
- Area: 1.24 acres (0.50 ha)
- Created: 1929
- Operator: Chicago Park District

Avondale Park is a 1.24-acre (0.50 ha) municipal park at 3516 W. School Street in the Avondale community area of Chicago, Illinois. Operated by the Chicago Park District, it contains a fieldhouse, an outdoor swimming pool and spray pool, a playground, pickleball courts, a gymnasium and a gymnastics center.

== History ==
The Irving Park District began acquiring land for Avondale Park in 1925 as residential construction increased in the surrounding neighborhood. The park was established in 1929 on approximately five acres, and land acquisition was completed in 1930. By the end of 1930, the district had built a brick fieldhouse designed by Clarence Hatzfeld. By the early 1930s, the park included a playfield, separate boys' and girls' playgrounds, a wading pool, a sandbox and tennis courts.

Avondale Park became part of the Chicago Park District in 1934, when the city's 22 independent park agencies were consolidated during the Great Depression.

Construction of the Kennedy Expressway reduced the park from about five acres to just over one acre by 1959, removing its playfield and tennis courts. The Park District reconfigured the remaining site with volleyball and basketball courts and a swimming pool. In the early 1990s, the district installed a soft-surface playground and replanted the landscape.

A pool compliance retrofit was completed in 2011. In 2013, the playground was rebuilt with new equipment through the Chicago Plays! program. Later projects included balcony reconstruction in 2014, path paving in 2017, and a spray feature, drinking fountain and accessible paving completed in 2023.
