= PWAA =

"PWAA" may refer to:

- Polish Women's Alliance, a fraternal benefit society.
- Phoenix Wright: Ace Attorney, a court-based video game.
- Pacific Western Athletic Association, a Canadian collegiate sports association based in western Canada, member of CCAA.
