= Basilica of Saint Hyacinth =

Coordinates: 41°56′01″N 87°43′07″W

St. Hyacinth Basilica
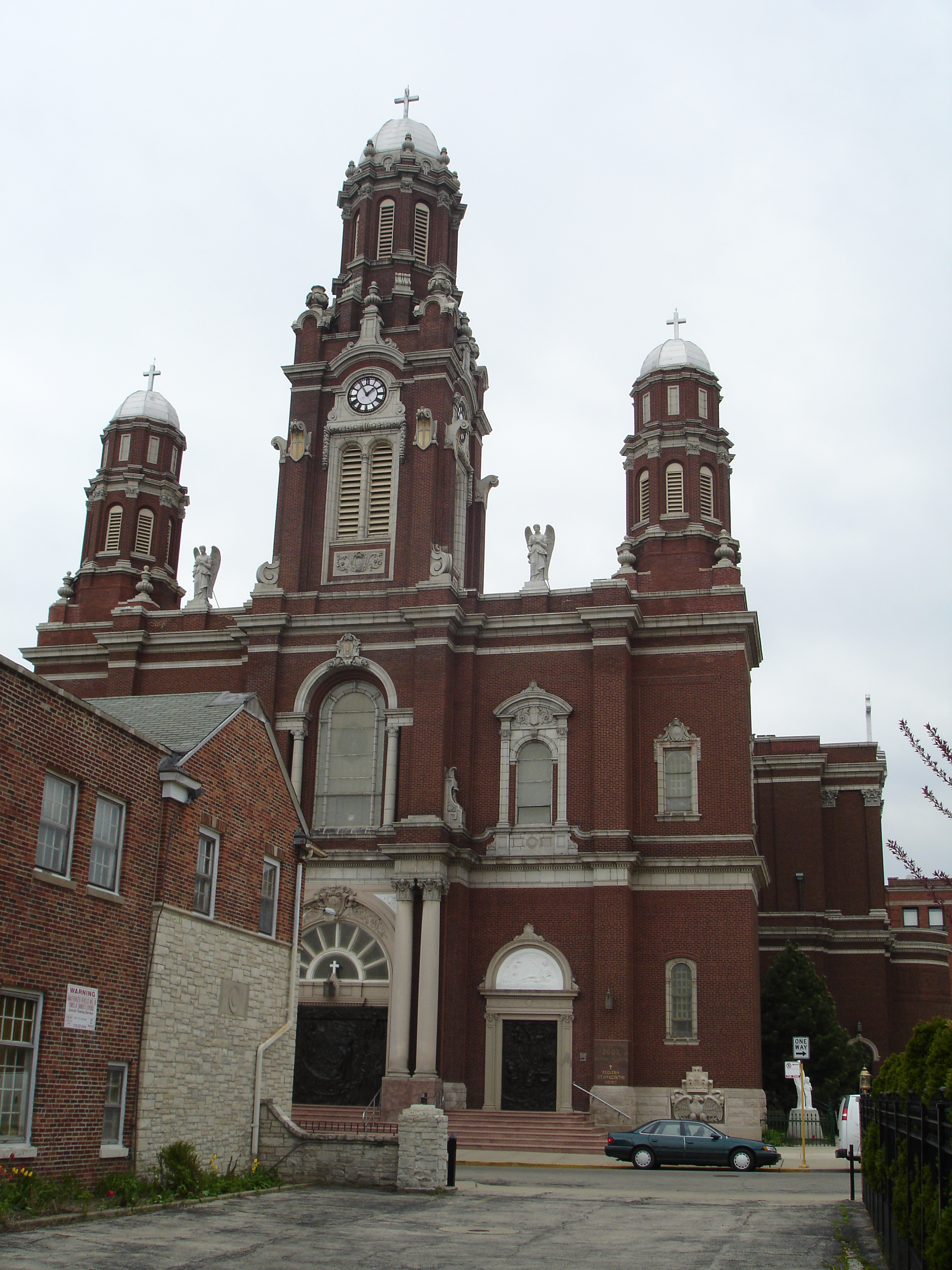

- Location within Illinois
- Location: Chicago
- Country: USA
- Denomination: Roman Catholic
- Website: St. Hyacinth Basilica

History
- Founded: 1894
- Founder: Congregation of the Resurrection
- Dedication: Hyacinth of Poland
- Dedicated: October 16, 1921

Architecture
- Functional status: Active
- Heritage designation: For Polish immigrants
- Architect: Worthmann and Steinbach
- Architectural type: Basilica
- Style: Classical Revival
- Groundbreaking: April 30, 1917
- Completed: August 7, 1921

Specifications
- Materials: Brick

The Basilica of Saint Hyacinth (Polish: Bazylika Świętego Jacka) is a historic church of the Roman Catholic Archdiocese of Chicago, located at 3636 West Wolfram Street in the Avondale neighborhood of Chicago, Illinois.

It is a prime example of the Polish Cathedral style of churches in both its opulence and grand scale. Along with such monumental religious edifices as St. Mary of the Angels, St. Hedwig's, and St. Wenceslaus, it is one of the many monumental Polish churches visible from the Kennedy Expressway.

St. Hyacinth was designated a minor basilica by Pope John Paul II in 2003, one of three churches in the Archdiocese of Chicago to hold that status. The parish remains active, with weekend Masses in Polish and English drawing more than 8,000 worshippers.

== History ==
Founded in 1894 by Resurrectionists from the city's first Polish parish, St. Stanislaus Kostka, St. Hyacinth became the center of Chicago's most well-known Polish Patch, Jackowo. The parish has been intimately tied in with Chicago's Polish immigrants, particularly those who arrived in the Solidarity and post-Solidarity waves of Polish migration to Chicago in the 1980s. On June 26, 2003, Pope John Paul II granted the designation of minor basilica, the third church in Illinois to achieve this status. On November 30, 2003, Cardinal Francis George OMI, officially proclaimed St. Hyacinth Church a basilica of the Archdiocese of Chicago.

Neighboring St. Wenceslaus parish was founded in 1912 as a Polish parish to relieve overcrowding at St. Hyacinth parish.

The 1999 film Stir of Echoes was partly filmed at St. Hyacinth Basilica.

== Architecture ==
The church was designed by the architectural firm of Worthmann & Steinbach who built many of the magnificent Polish Cathedrals in Chicago. The church structure—a red-brick edifice in the classical revival style—has an ornate interior of Baroque influence. Groundbreaking occurred on April 30, 1917, and the cornerstone was laid on October 21, 1917. Completion of the building was delayed for years by financial and construction difficulties, with the first Mass celebrated in the structure not taking place until August 7, 1921. Official dedication occurred on October 16, 1921, with Archbishop George W. Mundelein presiding.

St. Hyacinth's recognizable three-towered façade is rarely seen in American church architecture as well as the Baroque period that its style is modeled on. The church bells, a product of the McShane Bell Foundry of Baltimore, Maryland, were blessed and placed in the steeples in April 1924. St. Hyacinth's bears a striking similarity to St. Mary of the Angels, which was designed by the same architects at about the same time and use the same combination of stone, glazed terra-cotta and brick. Also like at St. Mary of the Angels, much of the church's interior was decorated by John A. Mallin, who decorated many other churches in Illinois, with two years of planning and another two years to execute the project. St. Hyacinth's is also home to the masterworks of such renowned painters as Tadeusz Żukotyński and Mary Stanisia. Beginning in the mid-1990s, and taking almost a decade, the interior was renewed thoroughly, much of the mural work being performed by Conrad Schmitt Studios of Wisconsin.

The stained glass windows have been identified as prepared by Meyer Co. of Munich, Germany, and some by the Zettler Co. of New York were installed in 1921. The church's organ, a mid-sized Kilgen organ (of St. Louis, Missouri) with 34 ranks, was likewise installed in the church in 1921. The Stations of the Cross were likely assembled in Austria in the 1830s.

A number of statues are found within the basilica's interior. A bas-relief of Saint Hyacinth hangs above the main altar, as well as full statues of Saint Peter and Saint Paul. Figures of the Sacred Heart of Jesus and the Blessed Mother (Immaculate Conception) are found at lesser side altars, along with a figure of Our Lady of Sorrows as a Pietà in the church's eastern alcove. Additionally, sculptures of Saint Joseph, Saint Ann, the Infant of Prague, Saint Maximilian Kolbe, Saint Francis of Assisi, Saint Anthony of Padua, Saint Barbara and Saint Thérèse of Lisieux are spread throughout the sanctuary.

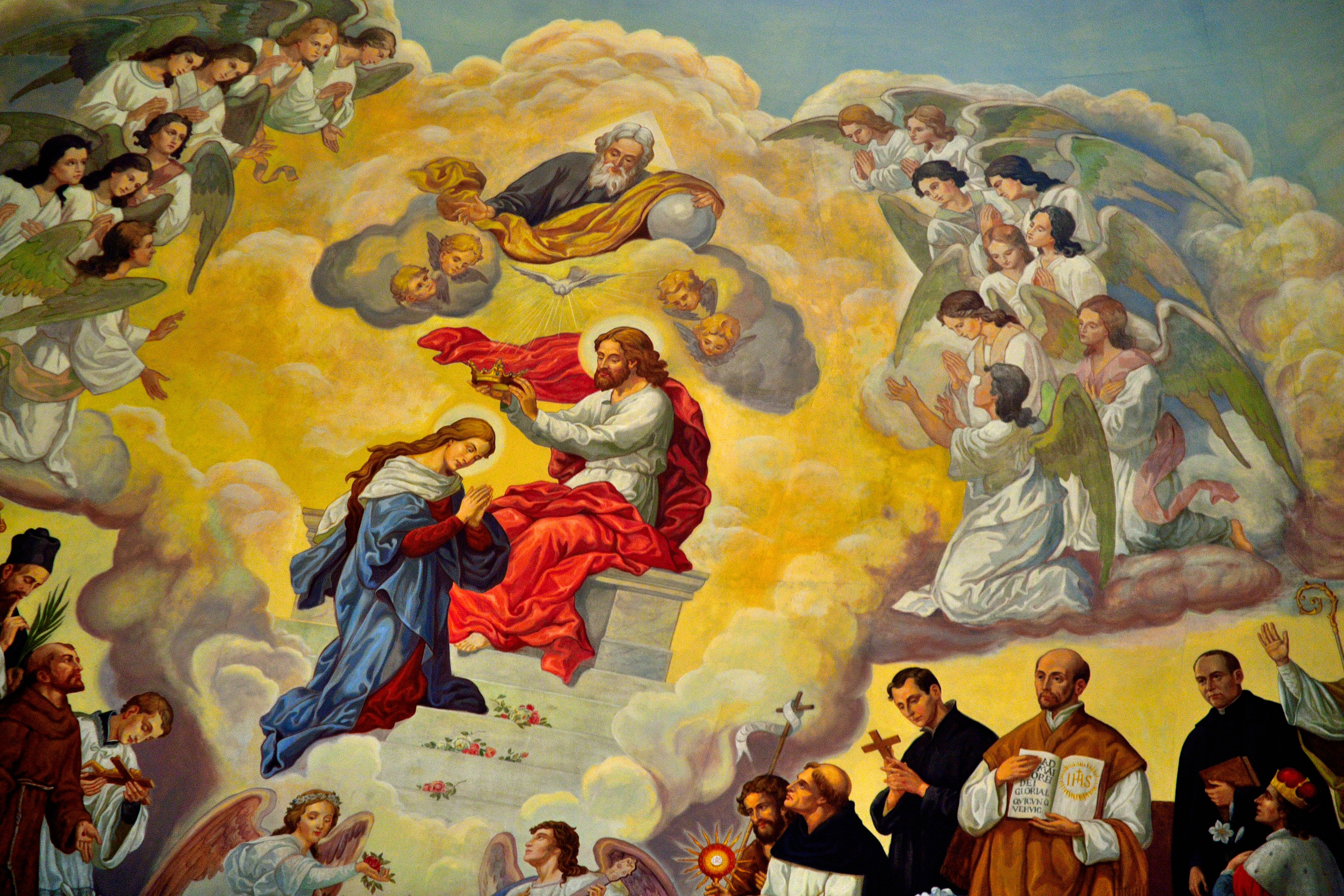
Detail of the mural in the basilica's dome

The large saucer dome which hangs over the church's crossing has a gigantic mural covering some 3,000 square feet (280 m^{2}) with over 150 figures, depicting saints, clergy and laity.

A large icon of Our Lady of Częstochowa that was brought in from Poland occupies the shrine in the basilica's western transept. The icon, which had been blessed by Pope John Paul II, is crowned in keeping with Roman Catholic tradition, with the Virgin Mary's crown measuring nearly a foot long while the Infant Jesus's crown being slightly smaller in size, each one bookended by bas-relief sculpted angels. Both crowns were crafted by Adam and Kathy Karbownik who melted down the gold and set the gemstones in them, while the jewelry used in the crowns was donated by thousands of parishioners with the gold alone weighed in at ten pounds

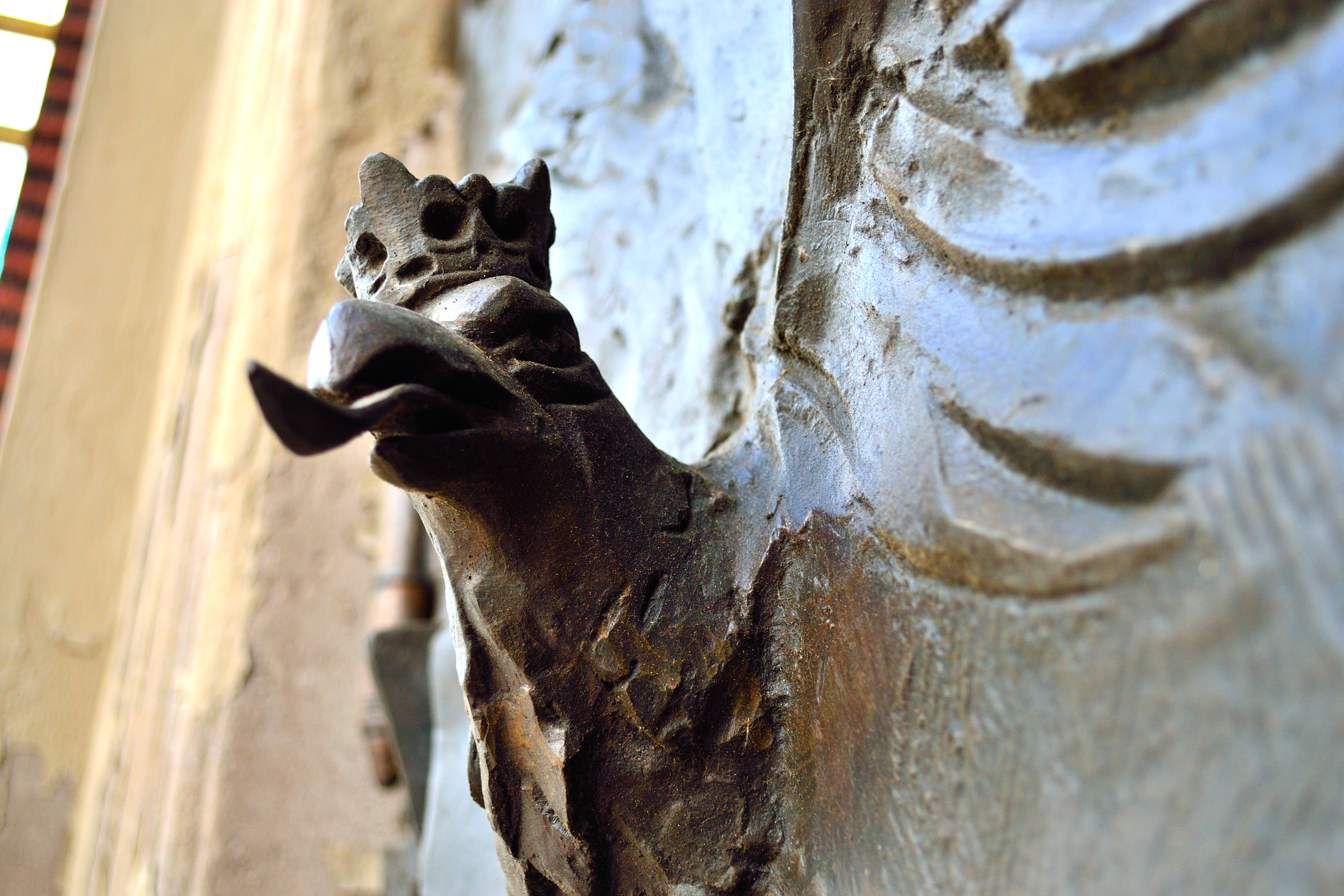
One of the basilica's bronze entrance doors by Czesław Dźwigaj

Three pairs of monumental bronze doors were hung along the main entrance at the basilica's northern end by famed Polish sculptor Czesław Dźwigaj, well known for also casting the monument of Christ the King in Cicero in front of the church of St. Mary of Częstochowa as well as the Tolerance Monument that was unveiled in Jerusalem.

Monuments to Pope John Paul II, and Father Jerzy Popiełuszko, as well as a memorial to parishioners who served in the Blue Army during World War I can be found in the neighboring 'Garden of Memory'.

== Center of Chicago's Polonia ==
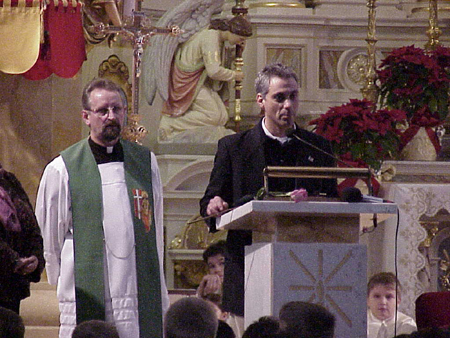
Rahm Emanuel speaking at St. Hyacinth Basilica.

Due to St. Hyacinth's impressive size and history as the center of the neighborhood of first arrival for countless Polish Americans, the Basilica has been described as the center of Chicago's Polonia, or Polish community.

This has brought notable visitors to St. Hyacinth's who come here to reach out to Chicago's Polish community. General Józef Haller, Prime Minister Stanisław Mikołajczyk, Nobel Peace Prize winner and former President of Poland Lech Wałęsa, and former Premier Jarosław Kaczyński as well as his deceased twin brother President Lech Kaczyński have paid official visits to St. Hyacinth's. Other famous Solidarity activists such as Anna Walentynowicz, Zbigniew Romaszewski and Antoni Macierewicz have visited the Basilica as well. Famous clergy have also visited, including the Servant of God Jan Cieplak as well as the future Pope John Paul II, who trekked to St. Hyacinth's several times as the Archbishop of Cracow and referred to his gatherings there during his 1979 pilgrimage to Chicago.

St. Hyacinth's also served as the place for local and national political elites to publicly cavort for the support of the Polish American electorate with politicians, their first stop as they would tour Chicago's Polish Village along with an obligatory meal at one of the local Polish restaurants. President George H. W. Bush attended mass at St. Hyacinth's twice, first as Vice President in 1985, as well as during his 1988 campaign. Purportedly, violence almost broke out as supporters of Lyndon LaRouche protesting outside the basilica were not looked at very kindly by local Poles, who had a reverence for the candidate they saw as the best hope against the loathed Communist regime in Poland.

== Relics ==
St. Hyacinth Basilica has an impressive collection of relics of saints of the Roman Catholic Church. A total of more than 175 relics are encased and presented to the faithful on All Saints' Day, as well as the memorial day of each saint. The list of relics includes but is not limited to:

- St. Hyacinth
- True Cross
- St. Peregrine
- St. Stanislaus Kostka
- St. Bonaventure
- St. Clara
- St. Andrew Bobola
- St. John Bosco
- St. Maria Goretti
- St. Bernadette
- St. Julian
- Pope Gregory I
- St. Elizabeth Seton
- St. Francis of Rome
- St. Vincent De Paul
- St. Ann
- St. John Cantius
- St. John Chrysostom
- St. Blaise
- St. Philip Neri
- St. Francis Xavier
- St. John Berchmans
- bl. Angela Truszkowska
- St. Faustina Kowalska
- St. Hedwig
- St. Stanislaus Bishop and Martyr
- St. Francis of Assisi
- St. Thérèse of Lisieux
- St. Andrew Avellino
- St. John Maria Vianney
- St. Elizabeth of Hungary
- St. Pius X
- St. Valentine
- St. John Paul II
- St. Maravillas de Jesus
- St. Simon Ap.
- True Cross
- St. John XXIII
- Padre Pio
- St. Agnes
- St. Aloysius Gonzaga

Additionally, the basilica is home to a collection of relics of Pope John Paul II during whose pontificate the church was titled a Minor Basilica. This collection contains his zucchetto, a rosary of his, his pectoral cross, and a relic of his blood.

== St. Hyacinth's today ==
St. Hyacinth is located in Chicago's Avondale neighborhood. About 8,000 worshippers attend mass every weekend. In keeping with customs brought to the area by Polish immigrants, the area is also known as "Jackowo", as "Jacek" is Polish for the proper name "Hyacinth". Naming neighborhoods or geographical areas after the local parish church is a widespread habit of Polish Catholics.

St. Hyacinth once had a thriving elementary school. In the 1960s, enrollment was over 2,500 students. On October 29, 2014, the Archdiocese of Chicago announced the closing of the school after the 2014–2015 school year. Enrollment was only 154 students.

== See also ==
- Poles in Chicago
- Roman Catholicism in Poland
