= Independence Park (Chicago) =

- U.S. National Register of Historic Places
- U.S. Historic district
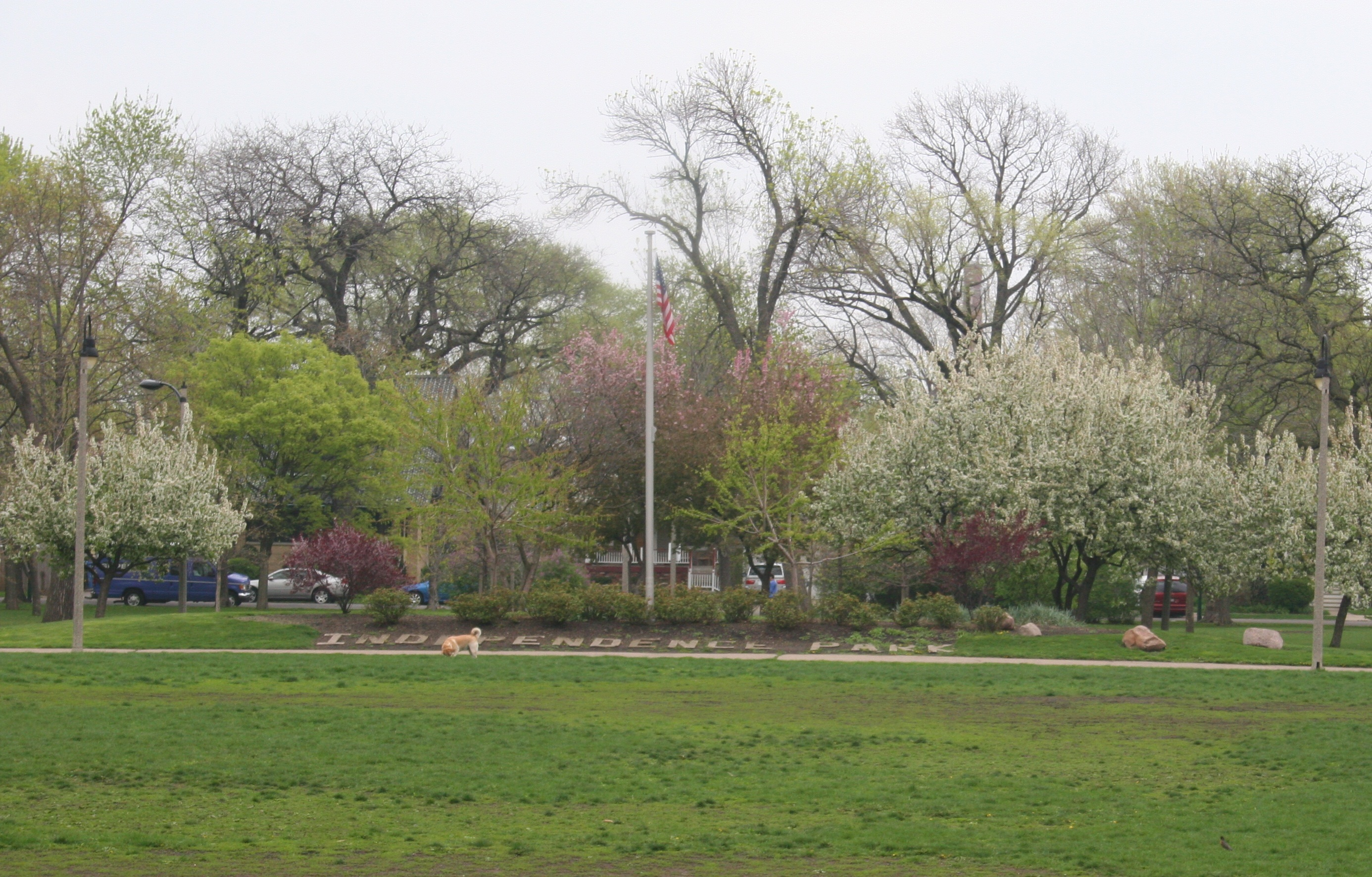

- Location within Chicago
- Location: 3945 N. Springfield Ave., Chicago, Illinois
- Coordinates: 41°57′10″N 87°43′26″W
- Area: 7.16 acres (2.90 ha)
- Architect: Hatzfeld & Knox
- Architectural style: Late 19th And 20th Century Revivals
- MPS: Chicago Park District MPS
- NRHP reference No.: 09000023
- Added to NRHP: February 18, 2009

Independence Park, officially Park #83 of the Chicago Park District, is a 7.16-acre (2.90 ha) recreational area in the Irving Park neighborhood of North Side, Chicago, Illinois.

First opened in 1914, the park has been the traditional location of Independence Day celebrations for Irving Park residents since 1903.

== History ==
=== 19th century ===
Irving Park was developed in the 1870s following a connection to the Chicago and North Western Railroad. Annexed to Chicago in 1889, the neighborhood boomed around the turn of the century. A number of civic groups, such as the Irving Park Improvement Club, the Irving Park Women's Club, and the Women's Relief Corps, the Irving Park Athletic Club, and the Irving Park Club, formed to meet the needs of residents.

=== 20th century ===
In 1903, these groups collaborated to plan an Independence Day celebration, held in an open space near the intersection of Irving Park Boulevard and North Springfield Avenue. Activities included a parade, a reading of the Declaration of Independence, singing, and sporting events. Fireworks became part of the celebration in 1907.

In March 1910, Irving Park residences filed a petition with Mayor of Chicago Fred A. Busse to request an independent park district. Busse forwarded the matter to the Special Park Commission, who recommended that the community form an independent district. At a meeting on April 12, 1910, the Irving Park District was established and five commission members were elected. In August 1911, the commission purchased the Independence Day celebration grounds and an adjacent property, a total of 5 acres (2.0 ha).

In 1913, the district commissioned architects Clarence Hatzfield and Arthur Howell Knox to design a field house. The two architects had previously worked under Dwight H. Perkins, the school architect of Chicago. As a middle-to-upper-class neighborhood, Irving Park residents wanted the park to resemble a country club. As a result, the field house was designed to include an indoor swimming pool, ballroom, and gymnasium. The Women's Club moved their library into the second floor of the building when it opened. Independence Park was dedicated on the Fourth of July, 1914. The building was also used as the park district headquarters.

The park also featured a running track, baseball fields, a playground, a wading pool, and two shelters in its early history. The baseball fields would be flooded in winters, creating ice skating rinks. The park hosted the Chicago Public High School league in 1918 and an ice skating derby in 1920. The library outgrew its quarters in 1928 and moved into its longtime home at 3715 W. Irving Park Road. By the late 1920s, the park had horseshoe courts, putting greens, and tennis courts.

The district also purchased adjacent properties in 1929, expanding the park to 7.86 acres (3.18 ha). Eight of the nine houses that they acquired were demolished; one remaining bungalow was converted to the Women's Club House. The bungalow, designed by Benedict J. Bruns, had been built in 1920 for produce wholesaler John Luttrell Coppersmith. Coppersmith sold the house to Henry Dick, a vice president at men's clothing firm Hart, Schaffner & Marx.

The large ballfield was removed in 1930 and was replaced with a sunken garden; costs of lighting and maintaining the field had proven prohibitive during the Great Depression. The garden featured a lily pool, a flag pole, and the name of the park was spelled out in concrete cut-outs. The Depression also forced the Irving Park District to consolidate with the other 22 park districts of Chicago through the Park Consolidation Act of 1934, creating the Chicago Park District. Works Progress Administration funds restored a softball field, the tennis courts, and the horseshoe courts. Funds were also provided to convert the basement of the bungalow to an arts & crafts studio. Max Decker painted May the Spirit of 1776 Live On' for the gymnasium in 1937.

In 1949, a new large ballfield was installed in the park.

== Present day ==
Recent additions to the park include a playground, a spray pool, parking lots, a CTA shelter, decorative fencing, two planters, a dolphin sculpture, and a memorial boulder dedicated to Charles A. Karavitch.

The park was recognized by the National Park Service with a listing on the National Register of Historic Places on February 18, 2009.
