= Milwaukee-Diversey-Kimball District =

Chicago landmark district

Coordinates: 41°55′55″N 87°42′44″W

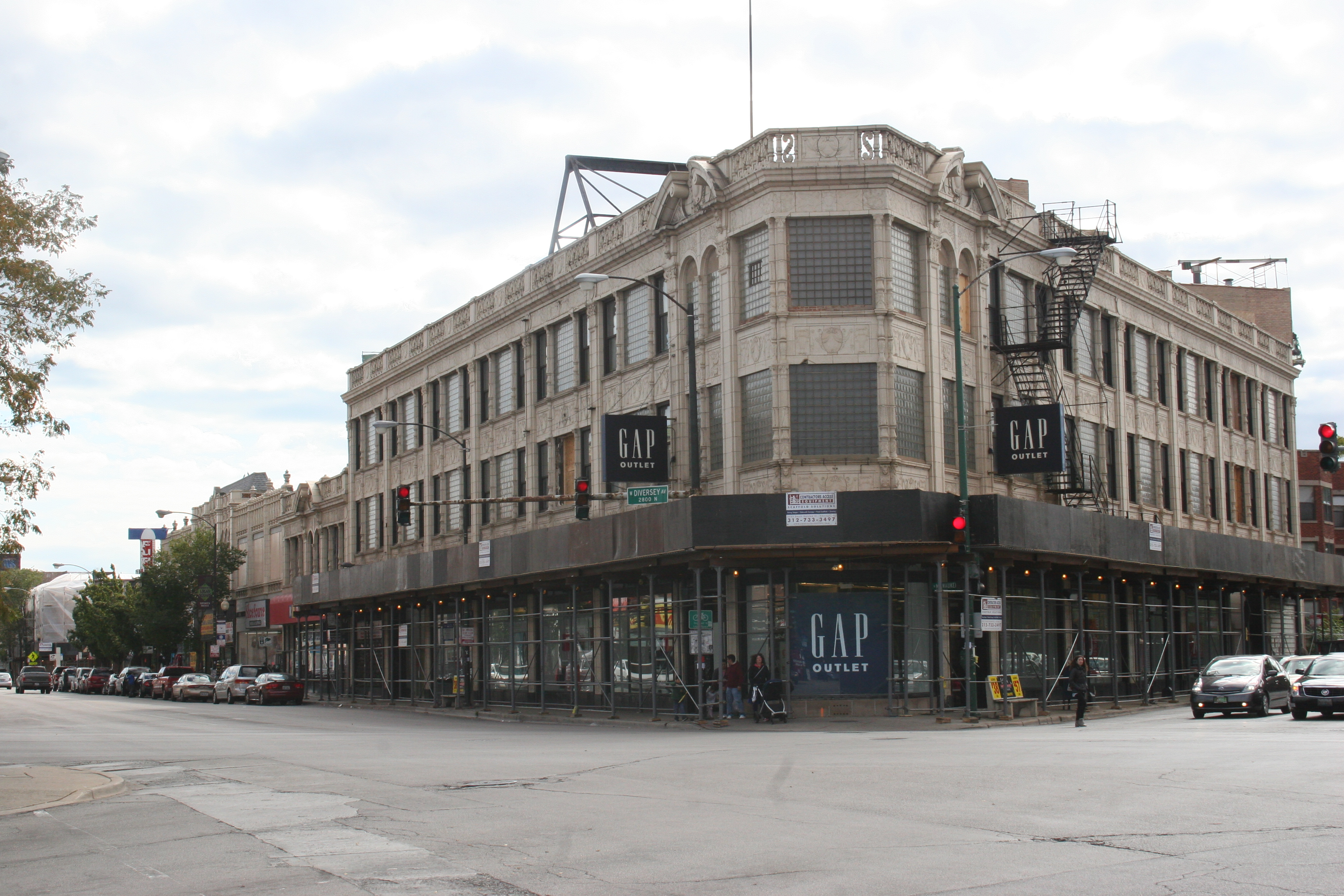
Building at 2778 Milwaukee Avenue

The Milwaukee-Diversey-Kimball District is a Chicago Landmark district at the six-point intersection of Milwaukee Avenue, Kimball Avenue, and Diversey Parkway in Chicago. The district comprises seven commercial buildings constructed from 1922 to 1930 and was designated a Chicago Landmark on February 9, 2005.

== History and architecture ==
In the 1920s, extensions of streetcar lines along Milwaukee and Diversey avenues created opportunities for commercial development. The district's buildings housed chain stores including Goldblatt's, F. W. Woolworth, and S. S. Kresge.

The buildings use Classical Revival and Art Deco styles, and several feature glazed terra cotta ornamentation. A 2010 Metropolitan Planning Council report described the district as encompassing the six-point intersection and seven historically significant commercial buildings.
