= Whistle Stop Inn =

Coordinates: 41.9538°N 87.7327°W

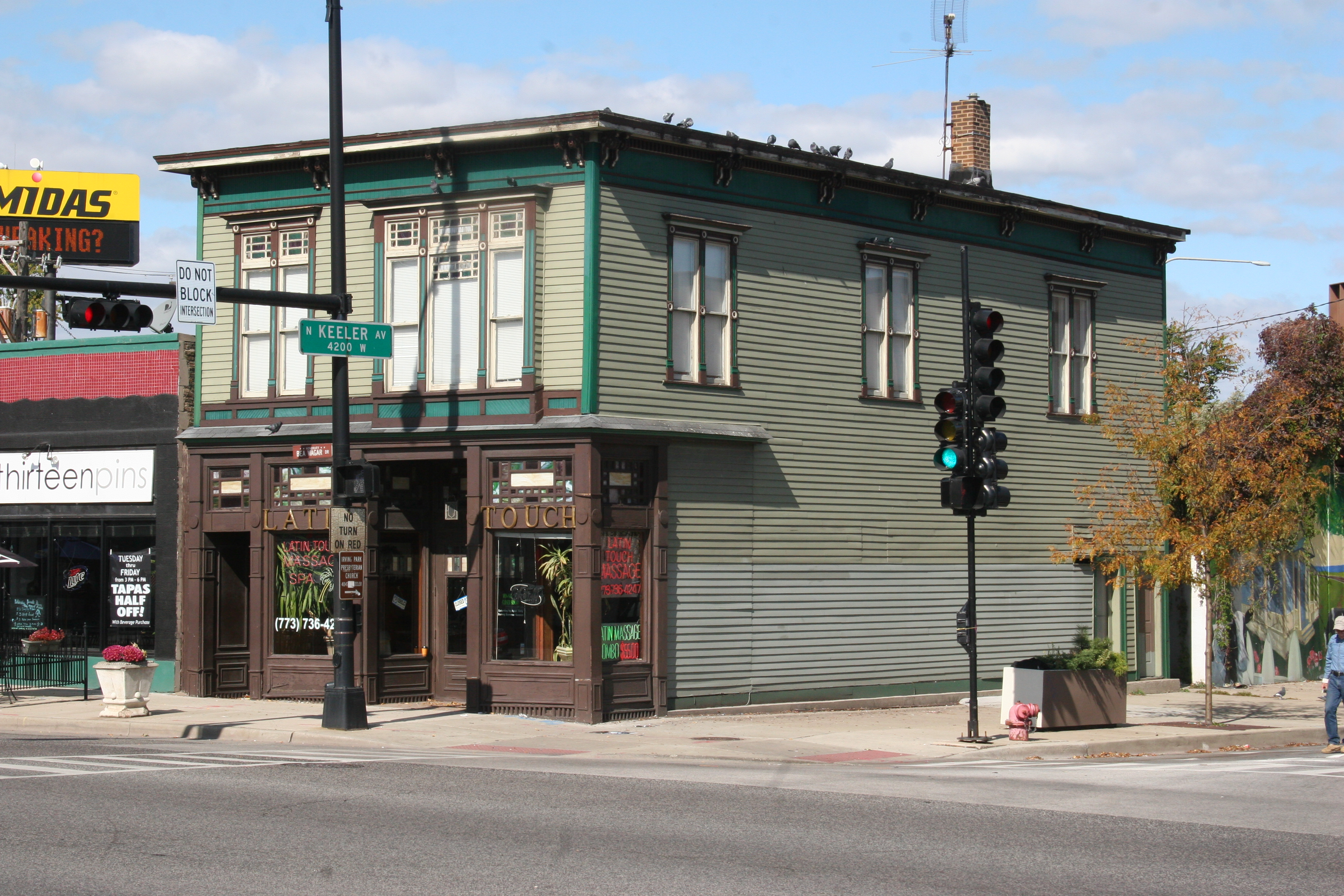
The Whistle Stop Inn

The Whistle Stop Inn is a two-story building in Chicago, Illinois, which has been the home of a variety of businesses. Built in 1889 in the Irving Park neighborhood, this place represents a type of intimate neighborhood storefront that was common but is now rare. The Whistle Stop Inn was designated a Chicago Landmark in 1990. It is at 4200 W. Irving Park Road, just off the Kennedy Expressway.
