= Olson Park and Waterfall =

Former park and waterfall in Chicago, Illinois

- Olson Rug Park; Olson Waterfall
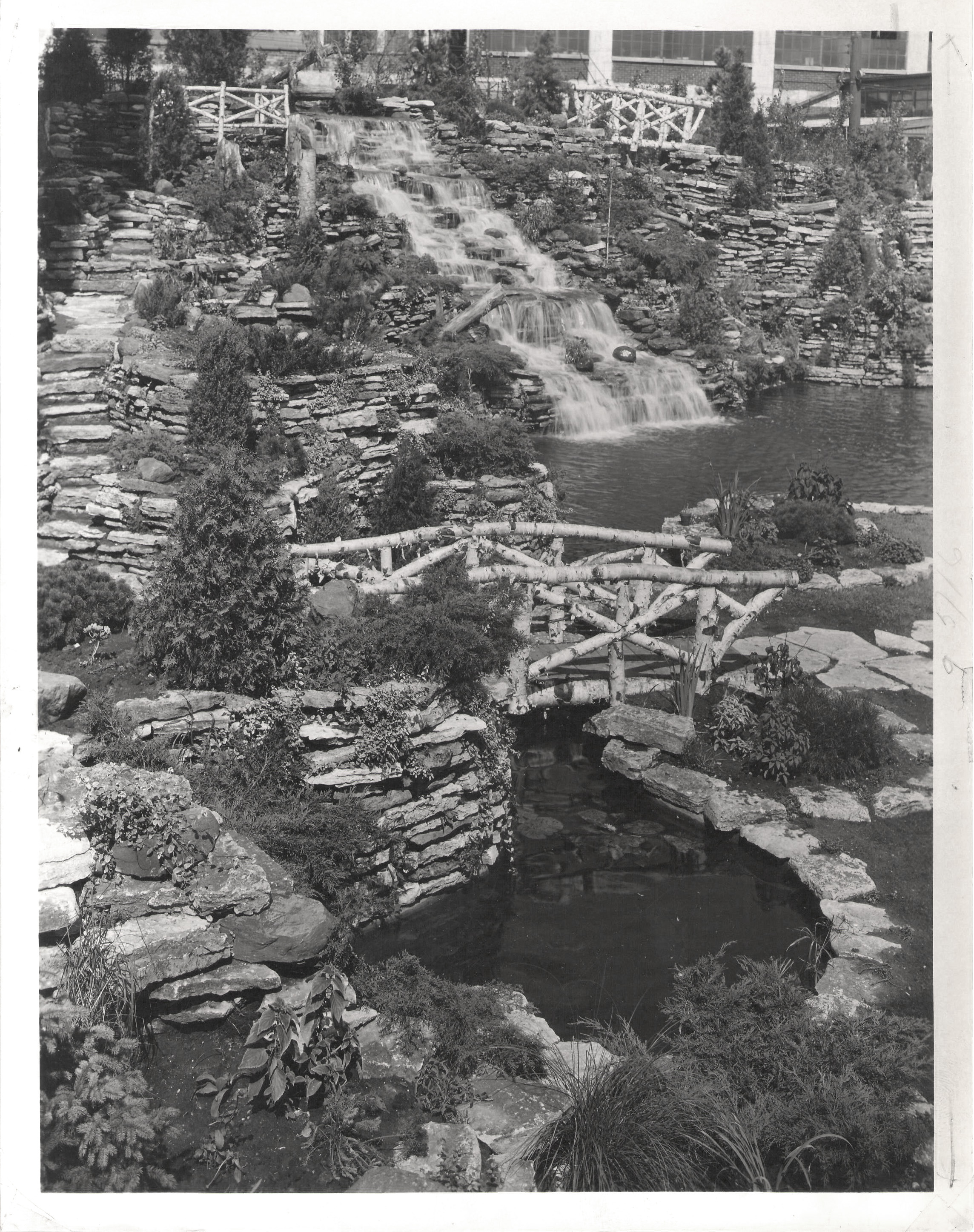
- The waterfall garden in November 1935
- Interactive map of Olson Park and Waterfall
- Type: Privately owned public park
- Location: Avondale, Chicago, Illinois, U.S.
- Coordinates: 41°55′56″N 87°43′39″W
- Area: 22 acres (8.9 ha)
- Created: 1935
- Closed: 1978
- Founder: Walter E. Olson
- Status: Demolished

Olson Park and Waterfall, also known as Olson Rug Park and the Olson Waterfall, was a privately built park and artificial-waterfall complex in the Avondale community area of Chicago, Illinois. The 22-acre (8.9 ha) grounds stood beside the Olson Rug Company factory at the northwest corner of Diversey Parkway and Pulaski Road. Company president Walter E. Olson created the park for his employees in 1935 and later opened it to the public free of charge. Its centerpiece was a 35-foot (11 m), multilevel waterfall that emptied into a lily pool.

After Marshall Field & Company bought the property in 1965, it continued to operate the park until 1978. The park was then demolished for a parking lot. In 2005, the Chicago Tribune included the complex in its list of "Chicago's Seven Lost Wonders".

== History ==
=== Construction and design ===
In 1935, as the Olson Rug Company expanded its Diversey Avenue factory, Walter Olson decided to recreate the northern Wisconsin scenery around his summer home on the plant grounds. Approximately 200 workers spent six months building the park with 800 tons of stone and 3,500 perennial plants and trees. The site included rock gardens, climbing paths, a bird sanctuary, a duck pond, an 800-foot (240 m) lawn, and the artificial waterfall. Its pumps circulated about 15,000 US gal (57,000 L) of water per minute into the lily pool.

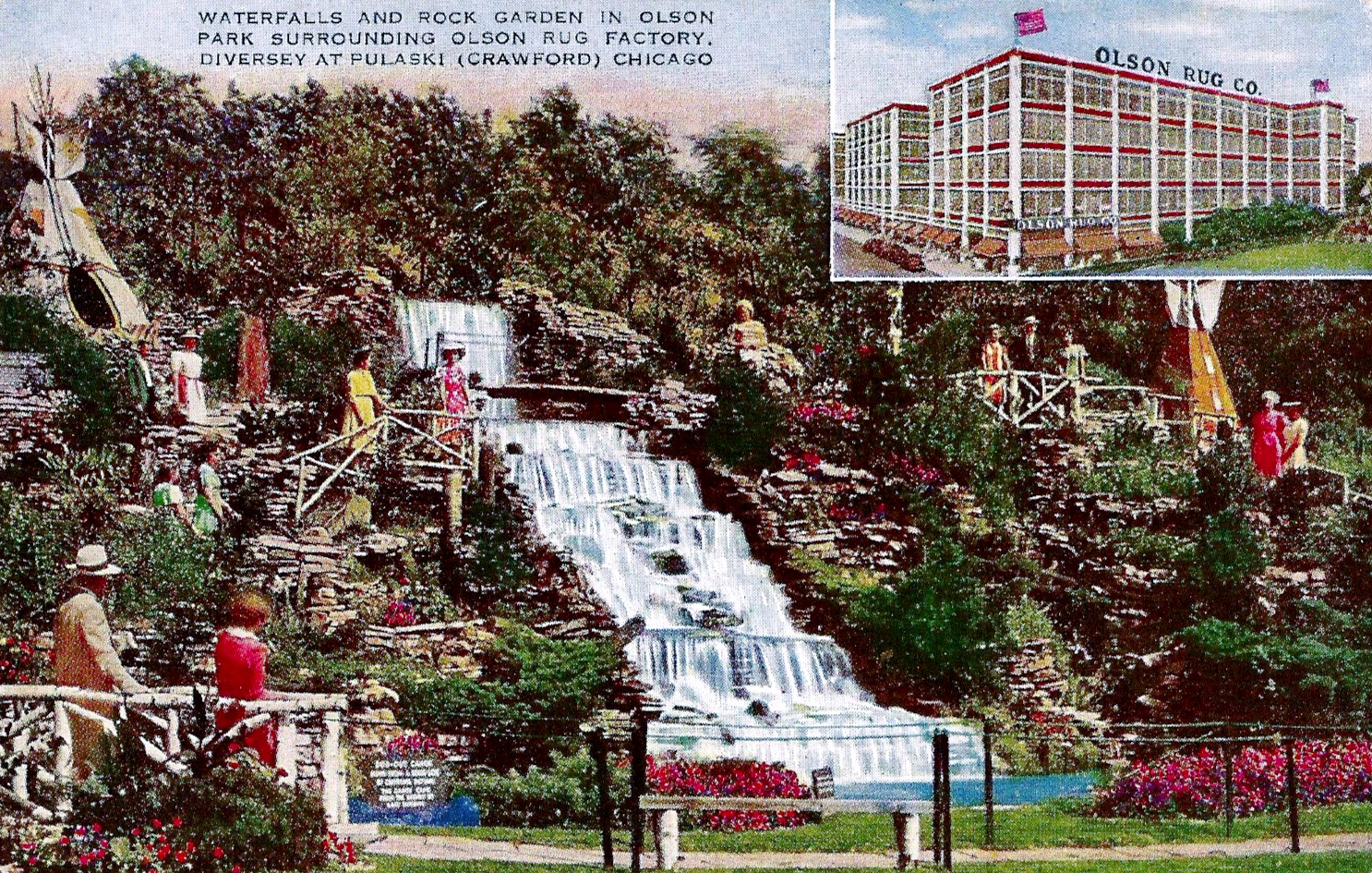
Postcard view of the park in 1943

Although first intended for company employees, the landscaped grounds became a public attraction. Admission was free, and by 1955 the park was receiving more than 200,000 visitors a year. Displays changed with the seasons; the company installed Christmas, Easter, and Halloween decorations, and the plantings provided further seasonal variation.

=== Dedication and Native American imagery ===
On September 27, 1935, the Chicago-based Indian Council Fire held its annual Indian Day at the newly completed grounds, which it called the Olson Rock Garden and Memorial Park. Members of the Potawatomi, Odawa, and Ojibwe peoples were invited. Contemporary news accounts reported that Olson symbolically presented them with a deed to the park, and Henry Roe Cloud received the organization's Indian Achievement Award at the event.

Native American imagery remained part of the park in statues, tipis, staged programs, and seasonal displays. Historian John N. Low wrote that later images showed participants in eagle-feather headdresses and Plains-style clothing; he found no evidence that members of the Pokagon Band of Potawatomi took part in the park's later activities.

=== Closure and redevelopment ===
Marshall Field & Company acquired the factory and park in 1965 and converted the plant into a warehouse. The company kept the park open until 1978, then razed it to expand the parking area. Macy's later used the adjacent warehouse, leaving it in 2008. During the 2010s, the surviving factory complex at 4000 West Diversey Avenue became part of The Fields, a mixed-use redevelopment that by 2018 included retail, office, warehouse, and self-storage space, with apartments under construction.

== Legacy ==
The waterfall remained prominent in local memory after its demolition. In 2005, Tribune columnist Ron Grossman named it first among "Chicago's Seven Lost Wonders". WTTW later featured the site in both Chicago Tonight's Ask Geoffrey and its Chicago Time Machine series.
