= Julius H. Huber =

American architect

Julius H. Huber (March 23, 1852 - October 21, 1939) was a prominent architect in Chicago, Illinois. He is especially known for his work in Edgewater, Chicago. Clarence Hatzfeld's early architectural training was largely in Huber's office. At least one building he designed is on the National Register of Historic Places. He is buried in Rosehill Cemetery. Huber designed churches, breweries, Brand's Hall at Clark and Erie streets, residences, apartments, stores and office buildings. His firm also worked on coal sheds, docks, and coal-handling machinery.

== Works ==
- 14-16 East Pearson duplex, listed on the National Register of Historic Places
- 14 East Chestnut townhouse (1895) (since demolished)
- 621-627? (1887) a four-unit row house
- 631 West Fullerton townhouse (1889)
- 163-173 West North Avenue (1886), a multi-unit
- 1054 West Oakdale residence (1886)
- 3221 S. Calumet (1885), converted into a Bed & Breakfast
- extension and steeple for First Lutheran church (c.1885), Blue Island, IL

=== Edgewater ===
He designed and lived in:

- 5510 N. Magnolia
- 5532 North Lakewood
- 5539 N. Wayne.

He designed 12 other houses in the Lakewood Balmoral addition to Edgewater, developed by John Lewis Cochran.

Other projects included:

- 5222 North Lakewood residence (1898-1901)
- 4519 North Virginia residence (1916)
- 6640 Ashland (1916), a three-flat
