= Diversey Parkway =

Street in Chicago, Illinois, United States

Diversey Parkway (Diversey Avenue)
- Michael Diversey Memorial Parkway; 2800 North
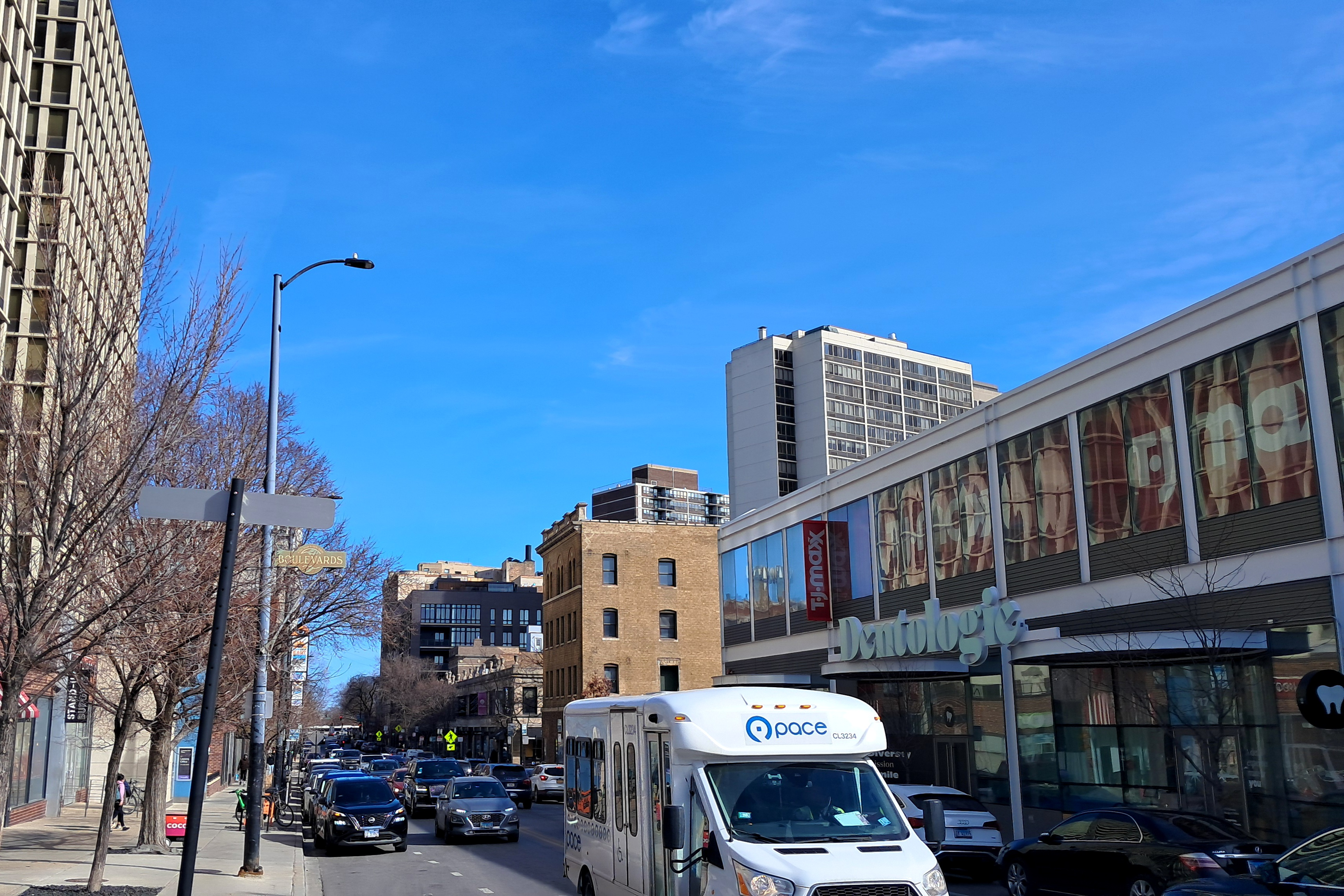
- Interactive map of Diversey Parkway (Diversey Avenue)
- Location: Chicago, Elmwood Park, Franklin Park, Northlake, Elmhurst, Addison, West Chicago
- Coordinates: 41.9328°N 87.6449°W
- West end: Woodland Avenue, West Chicago
- East end: Lake Shore Drive, Chicago (the "Inner Drive"--approx. 300 West)

Diversey Parkway (/dɪˈvɜːrsiː/, 2800 N.) is a major east–west street on the North Side of Chicago. Diversey separates the Chicago lakefront neighborhoods of Lakeview to the north and Lincoln Park to the south. West of the North Branch of the Chicago River, the street is known as Diversey Avenue, and separates the neighborhoods of Avondale to the north and Logan Square to the south. Further west, Diversey Avenue is a major street in Chicago's Hermosa, Belmont Cragin, and Montclare neighborhoods, and it continues intermittently through the west suburbs. The street is named after 19th century beer brewer Michael Diversey.

== Points of interest ==
Diversey has a few points of interest such as Mies van der Rohe's Commonwealth Promenade Apartments (1957), the Elks National Memorial Headquarters Building, the Brewster Apartments, the Urantia Foundation Building, the Lathrop Homes, Diversey River Bowl, Kosciuszko Park, Diversey Driving Range, and the Brickyard Shopping Center (formerly a mall). Diversey also goes by the site of one of Chicago's Seven Lost Wonders, the Olson Park and Waterfall complex, which was located at the northwest corner of Pulaski and Diversey.

== Transportation ==
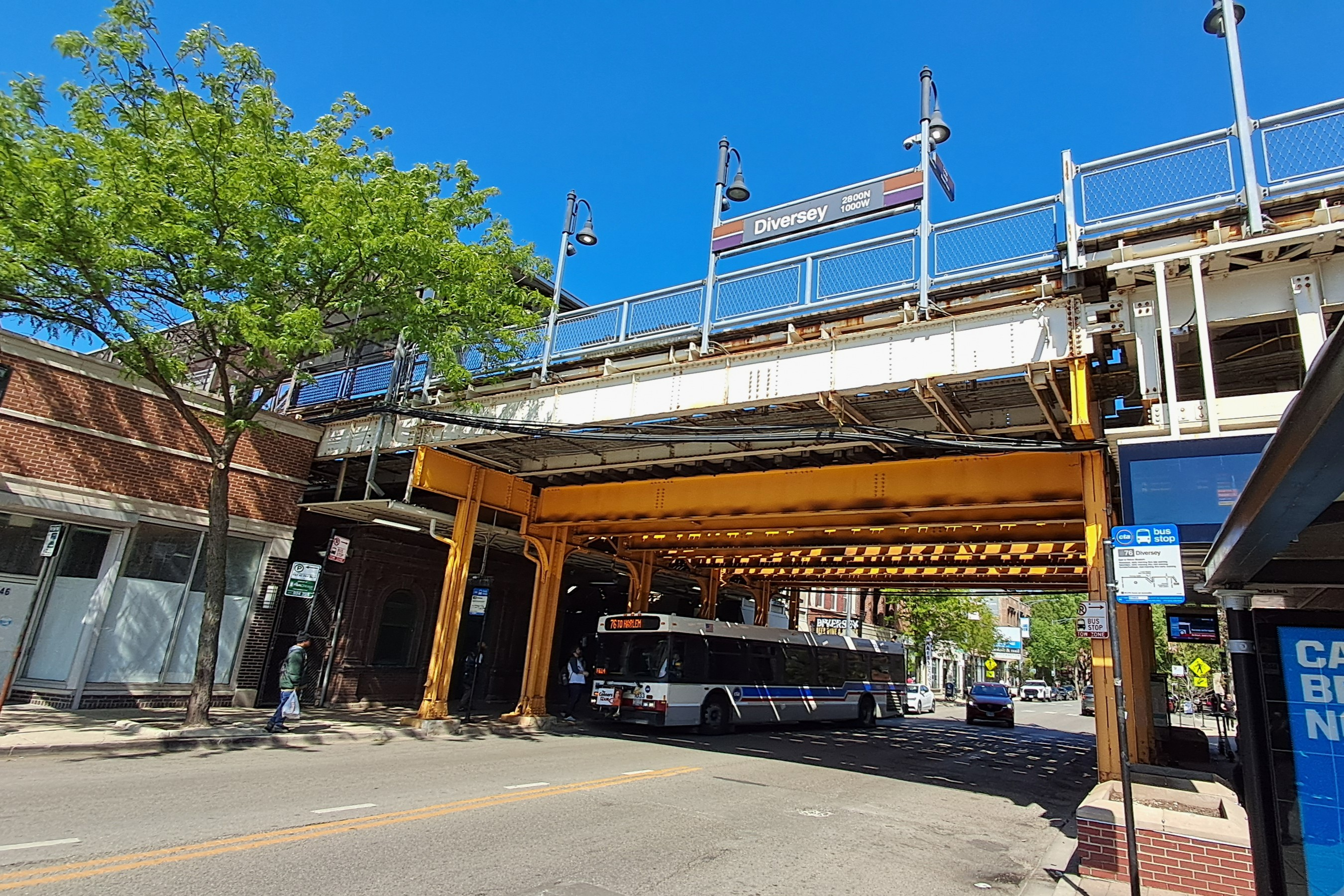
Route 76 bus at Diversey station

Diversey Parkway is served by the 76 Diversey between Harlem Avenue and Cannon Drive.

The following CTA Lines stop at Diversey Parkway:

- Brown Line and Purple Line Express at Sheffield Avenue
- Blue Line at Kedzie and Milwaukee Avenues
