= Emilia Napieralska =

Polish-American social worker and activist

Napieralska, circa 1934

Emilia Napieralska was a 20th-century Polish-American social worker and activist. She was a longtime president of the Polish Women's Alliance of America.

== Biography ==
Napieralska was born in the United States, a member of the Polish diaspora.

Napieralska worked as a social worker.

Napieralska joined the Polish Women's Alliance of America (PWA) in 1902. She was elected its secretary in 1910, and was re-elected in 1912, 1914, and 1916. She was elected its president in 1918, and was re-elected in 1921, 1924, 1927, and 1931. She was the first American-born president of the organization. Napieralska was one of the most esteemed and involved women in the Polish-American community, and was a leading feminist in the United States' Polish diaspora community. Her skill for oratory was highly regarded.

Napieralska additionally served as a member of the Chicago chapter of the Safety Council, and a member of the 1915 Women at the Hague peace conference.

Poland's government honored Napieralska as a member of Order of Polonia Restituta and further awarded her Miecze Hallerowskie, the Silesian Uprising Cross, Komandorja Krzyza z Rzymu, and the Silver Cross of Merit.
