= Saint Peregrine =

Saint Peregrine may refer to:

== People ==
- Peregrinus, Bishop of Terni, †138
- Peregrine (martyr), †192
- Peregrine of Auxerre, † ca. 261 or 304
  - San Pellegrino in Vaticano
- Peregrine Laziosi, 1260–1345, an Italian saint of the Servite Order

== Other ==
- San Pellegrino (disambiguation)
