= Caryl Yasko =

American muralist (born 1941)

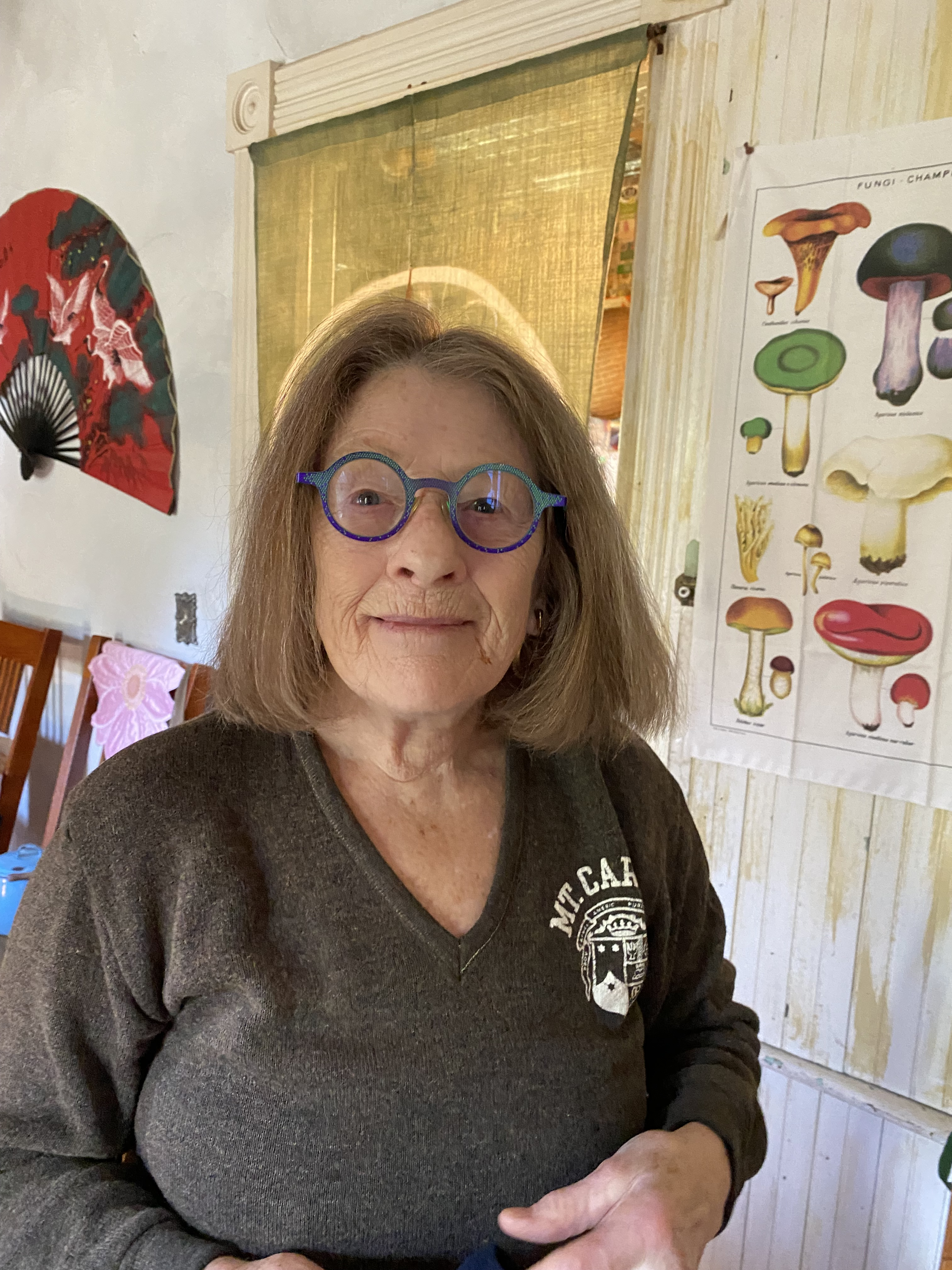
Yasko in 2025 at her home

Caryl Yasko (née Caryl Anne Nelson; born March 11, 1941) is an American muralist, and one of the founders of the Chicago Mural Group (now the Chicago Public Art Group, or CPAG).

== Early life ==
Caryl Anne Nelson was born on March 11, 1941, in Racine, Wisconsin, and is the daughter of Walter Nicolai (Red) Nelson and Josephine Pfeiffer. In June 1963, Caryl married Richard A. Yasko at St. Rita’s in Racine, Wisconsin. "Yasko graduated from Dominican College with a bachelor's degree in art in 1963. Five years later, Yasko relocated to Japan after her husband was awarded a Fulbright scholarship, and was influenced by the Japanese brush-and-ink technique, which she incorporated into her trademark style. In 1970, Yasko relocated to Chicago's South Side where she started working with her mentor, community artist William Walker. She was a founding artist in the Chicago Mural Group and taught public mural techniques at the School of the Art Institute of Chicago and other colleges and universities."

== Works ==
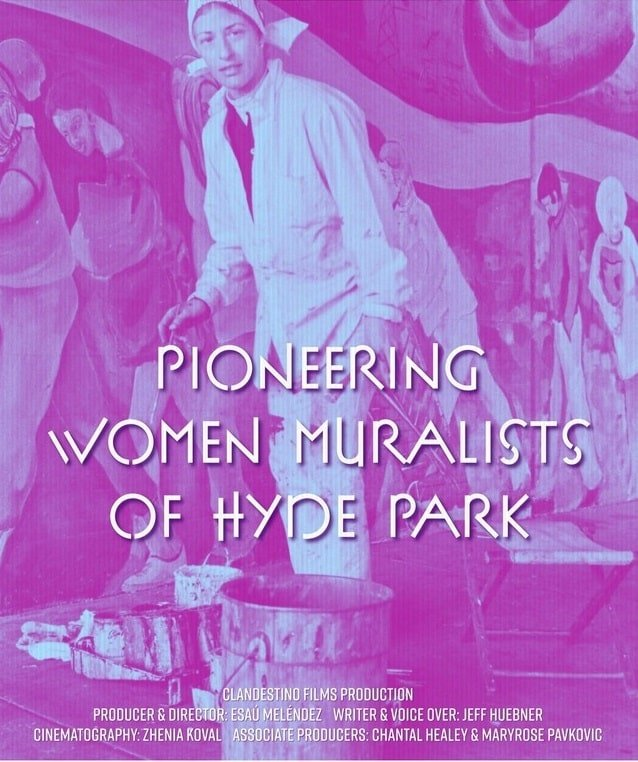
Pioneering Woman Muralists of Hyde Park, 2024

Yasko designs murals emphasizing collaborative creation, as such, her murals are painted in conjunction with concrete sculptures resulting in unique projects.

Yasko created an award-winning mural titled Under City Stone (1972, Hyde Park, Chicago) which was recently restored by Yasko. The Health of the People is the Foundation of Their Happiness and Power (1973, Chicago), I am the People (1974, Chicago), Lemont Quarry Workers (1975 original, 2021 restoration, Lemont, Illinois), Prescription for Good Health Care (1975, Chicago), Razem (Chicago), and The Prairie Tillers (1980 original, 2004 restoration, Whitewater, Wisconsin), Robert Kellner Memorial (Madison, Wisconsin, 1984) and I am Quercus Lobata (UC Davis, 2014).

Yasko was featured in the film documentary “Pioneering Women Muralists of Hyde Park” (2024) directed by Esau Melendez, which features the history of public art in the Hyde Park neighborhood of Chicago, Illinois and was screened in the 14th Annual New Hope Film Festival in Pennsylvania (2024).
