= Diversey Driving Range =

Diversey Driving Range in Chicago, Illinois

General information
- Type: Golf driving range
- Location: 141 W. Diversey Parkway, Chicago, Illinois, United States
- Coordinates: 41.9337043°N 87.6375236°W
- Opened: 1916 (as a nine-hole golf course)
- Owner: Chicago Park District
- Operator: Indigo Golf Partners

Other information
- Facilities: Two-tier driving range, covered and heated hitting stalls, putting greens, miniature golf

Website
- diversey.cpdgolf.com

The Diversey Driving Range is a golf course located in Lincoln Park in Chicago. It was initially developed as a six-hole golf course between 1911 and 1913. In 1916, it was expanded to nine holes and officially dedicated in a ceremony attended by Illinois Governor Edward Fitzsimmons Dunne. The golf course was converted into a driving range and miniature golf facility in the late 1940s.
