= Polish Women's Alliance of America =

The Polish Women's Alliance of America (pol. Związek Polek w Ameryce) was a fraternal benefit society that was founded on May 22, 1898 in Chicago, Illinois.

The Polish Women's Alliance was founded by Stefania Chmielinska, a Polish immigrant who worked as a seamstress in Chicago. Chmielinska was vocal in her belief that women deserved equality and actively worked to promote this cause. Her belief in the ability of immigrant women to establish themselves into an organization that would promote self-sufficiency and offer financial stability was quite progressive for the 1900s, when women were still not allowed to vote.

The right of women to pursue higher education, the right to enter many professions, and the right of women to purchase life insurance in their own names were some of the issues tackled by the founders of the Polish Women's Alliance. Stefania Chmielinska and other founding members worked against these restrictions and developed the Alliance into a national organization as well as a leader in the Polish and Polish-American communities.

The Polish Women's Alliance had been actively involved in some of the most central events and causes in Polish–American life. Among these were Poland’s determination to become a nation after the Partitions of Poland, during which the country lacked an independent existence; funding the purchase of radium for the experiments of Madame Maria Sklodowska Curie; a fundraising effort for a Polish Women's Alliance bomber for the United States Air Force during World War II; the founding and organizing of the Polish American Congress in 1944; restoration and renovation projects for the Statue of Liberty and Ellis Island; supporting the National Shrine of Our Lady of Czestochowa in Doylestown, Pennsylvania; and supporting the Pope John Paul II Cultural Center in Washington D.C., and the Pope John Paul II Pilgrim Home in Rome.

The PWAA actively sponsored many Polish cultural events such as Polish language, literature, folklore, history and folkdance lessons, festivals and youth conferences. They also sponsored religious, hospital, and children's institutions in Poland, including a school for the blind in Laski, Poland.

Local units were called "Groups" and regional organizations were called "Councils". The headquarters of the Alliance were in Park Ridge, Illinois.

The Alliance had 90,000 members in 1979, but declined to 65,000 members by 1994.

== See also ==
- Emilia Napieralska, longtime president of the organization
