= St. Wenceslaus Church, Chicago =

Coordinates: 41.9432°N 87.7196°W

St. Wenceslaus Church
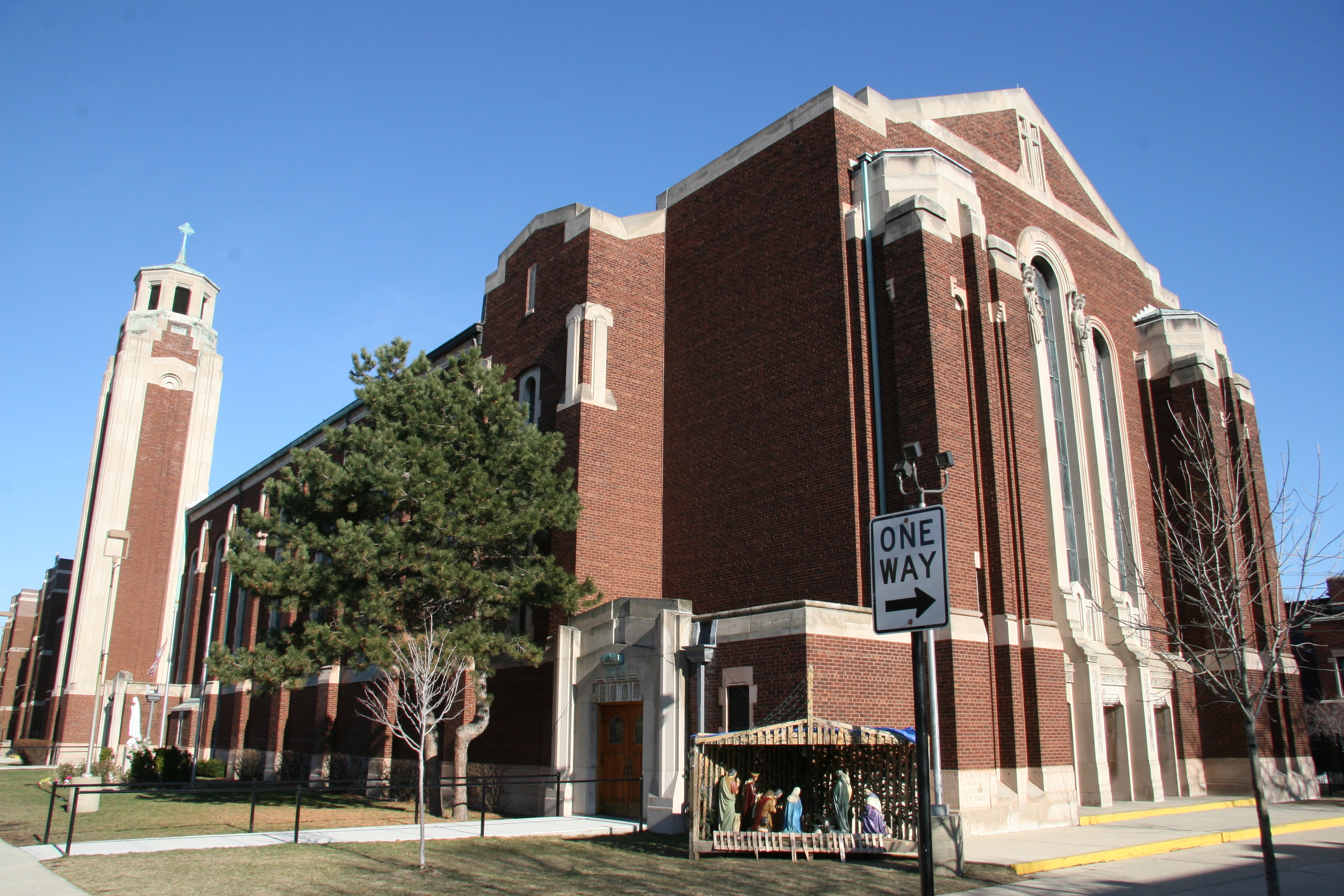

- Location within the United States
- Location: 3400 North Monticello Avenue; Chicago, Illinois
- Country: United States
- Denomination: Roman Catholic
- Website: St. Wenceslaus's Parish

History
- Founded: June 1912
- Founder: Polish immigrants
- Dedication: St. Wenceslaus
- Dedicated: June 7, 1942

Architecture
- Functional status: Active
- Heritage designation: For Polish immigrants
- Architect(s): McCarthy, Smith and Eppig
- Architectural type: Church
- Style: Byzantine & Romanesque
- Groundbreaking: March 27, 1940
- Completed: 1942

Specifications
- Materials: Brick

St. Wenceslaus (Polish: Kościół Świętego Wacława) is a church of the Roman Catholic Archdiocese of Chicago located at 3400 North Monticello Avenue in the Avondale neighborhood of Chicago, Illinois, USA.

One of the many Polish churches visible from the Kennedy Expressway, it is along with St. Hyacinth Basilica, one of two monumental religious edifices that dominate the Avondale skyline. It is well-known for its unique architecture, as well as being the site where the photographer and historic preservationist Richard Nickel was married.

Although the historic church is a stop for many tourists visiting the landmark Villa District, this majestic Romanesque-Art Deco hybrid is actually a few blocks south of the district's formal boundaries. St Wenceslaus is accessible via the Blue Line's Addison street station.

== History ==
St. Wenceslaus was founded in 1912 as a Polish parish to relieve overcrowding at St. Hyacinth parish, which first met in a small wooden frame structure at Roscoe Street and Lawndale Avenue. The present church was built in 1942 and was the first church to be consecrated by the newly appointed Cardinal Samuel Stritch in the Archdiocese of Chicago. One of Chicago's Polish Patches, the Polish language term for the surrounding neighborhood, Wacławowo derives from the Polish name for the church's patron, Saint Wenceslaus I, Duke of Bohemia. In recent years, the ethnic character of the parish has undergone a gradual change from an exclusively Polish to one that is multicultural and multiracial, as the neighborhood first witnessed an influx of Hispanic and Filipino immigrants during the 1990s and later began to experience minor pockets of gentrification. Today, mass is celebrated in three languages: English, Polish and Spanish. St. Wenceslaus has been administered by the Congregation of the Resurrection since July 2000.

On June 10, 1950, Richard Nickel, an American photographer and historian best known for his efforts to preserve and document the buildings of the architect Louis Sullivan, married Adrienne Dembo, a young Polish-American girl, at St. Wenceslaus.

St. Ladislaus in Portage Park was originally a mission of St. Wenceslaus in what was then a primarily rural area annexed to Chicago.

== Architecture ==
The church was designed by the firm of McCarthy, Smith and Eppig, a firm that worked extensively with Cardinal George Mundelein and produced numerous Chicago area Catholic churches during the Great Depression era, including Queen of Angels in Chicago, St. Joseph and St. Francis Xavier churches in Wilmette and St. Bernardine in Forest Park. It is considered to be "one of the best examples of the fusion of Art Deco stylings with medieval European architecture in the city of Chicago".

The building's overall design is a fusion of Byzantine and Romanesque elements with a host of Art Deco features that were current at the time of construction. The church is encased in walls of pressed brick trimmed with Indiana limestone, some of it adorned with carved ornament to highlight the building's sacred function. At the point where the nave narrows to the apse, a campanile arises, designed to direct the attention of the viewer to the purpose of the edifice.

Two monumental angel sculptures loom over the façade of the main entrance, which leads into a large narthex or vestibule whose walls are lined with Notre Dame and Oriental marble on a base of Red Levanto, while the floor is paved in ceramic tiles. Beyond the narthex is the spacious and well-lit nave which can accommodate a congregation of up to 1,200 worshipers. To a height of ten feet above the floor and against the entire exterior wall a wainscot of American black walnut has been installed. The wainscot rests on top of a continuous base of Windham Verde Antique marble, and is indented by four confessionals and in the forward part of the nave four votive shrines that are set up against the wall. The aisles are paved in ceramic tiles while the pews are carved out of the same American black walnut.

The apse or sanctuary is enclosed behind a heavy rail of rich "breccia orientale" penetrated at regular intervals with a lattice of brilliant bronze. A floor of oriental and Florida deep rose marbles leads to the predella or platform of the church's dominant feature, the main altar. The church is designed to direct the eye to the central altar and its crucifix, set against a huge background or reredos of inlaid wood. The reredos was formed by inlaying some 25 precious woods on a foundation of Honduras mahogany rising to a height of 37 feet above the sanctuary floor as the setting for the huge crucifix, which is cut from a mammoth block of bluish-black Port D'Oro marble.

The main altar from which this featured crucifix arises is a permanent altar in the liturgical sense that it rests on its own foundation, as is required by Roman Catholic liturgical law. The side, or votive altars are similarly constructed. The altar table rests on a predella or stylobate of Verde Nicoli stone, the top platform which is inlaid with red Verona and rose coral marbles. The sacrificial table or mensa is light colored pietra di Trani surmounted by a tabernacle of rose coral marbles. The votive or side altars conform and hence are in harmony with the principal altar, both in color and in form

The church's interior features a distinct historicizing Art Deco motif with a color scheme of light pastel tints, which includes the church's impressive stained glass windows. Although the church is filled with depictions of Polish saints and folkloric motifs, it is much more subdued in comparison to Chicago's more well-known Polish cathedrals. The church's most well-known asset, a set of mosaic Stations of the Cross that were executed in the Vatican City in Rome, line the sides of the building's interior. All of the furnishings of the church such as altars, pulpit and pews were executed from designs by the original architects at the expressed wish of Monsignor Czastka who was the pastor at St. Wenceslaus at that time in order to present a consistent and harmonious edifice.

The Purgatorial shrine was painted by Jan Henryk De Rosen who famously decorated the interior of the Armenian Cathedral in L'viv. Next to it is a recently installed figure of Santo Niño de Cebú, a devotion to the Child Jesus popular in the Philippines.

Much of the intricate painted ornamental designs that appeared throughout the church were not saved while painting during a recent renovation of the church because of a lack of parish funds.

== See also ==
- Polish Cathedral style churches of Chicago
- Polish Americans
