= Clarence Hatzfeld =

American architect (1873–1943)

- Born: 1873; Milwaukee, Wisconsin, U.S.
- Died: 1943 (aged 69–70); Washington, D.C., U.S.
- Occupation: Architect
- Known for: Park field houses, Masonic temples, Prairie and Craftsman styles
- Notable work: Independence Park Field House (1913), Logan Square Masonic Temple (1921), South Side Masonic Temple, Villa District residences, Immel State Bank
- Spouse: Laurette “Laura” Haentze
- Practice: Julius Huber & Co., Hatzfeld & Knox

Clarence Hatzfeld (1873–1943) was a prolific Chicago architect who designed residences, park field houses, Masonic temples, banks and other commercial buildings in the Craftsman, Prairie, and Revival styles.

== Biography ==
=== Early life ===
Born in Milwaukee, Wisconsin, Clarence was the son of a German immigrant father, Richard Hatzfeld, and an American-born mother, Emma Drake Hatzfeld. When he was a child, Hatzfeld's family moved to Chicago and his father, who was a pharmacist, soon opened a drug store in Lakeview on the city's North Side. After attending college, Hatzfeld's early architectural training was "largely in the office of the late Julius Huber." Son of architect John Paul Huber, Julius Huber was a locally prominent architect who designed many residences in Chicago's Edgewater neighborhood. Hatzfeld worked for Julius Huber for several years, was promoted to partner in 1899, and the firm became known as Julius Huber & Co. During this period, Hatzfeld was an active member of the Chicago Architectural Club, where he became acquainted with "many aspiring designers who would make important contributions to the burgeoning Prairie style of architecture including Henry Webster Tomlinson, Hermann von Holst, Birch Burdette Long, Robert Spencer Jr., Irving K. Pond, and Dwight Heald Perkins."

In 1901, Hatzfeld left Huber's firm to work as a draftsman for the Chicago Board of Education, first under head architect William B. Mundie, and later under Dwight Heald Perkins, with whom he was already acquainted through the Chicago Architectural Club. Under Perkins's leadership, a large collection of earth-toned brick Chicago Public School buildings were constructed with simple terracotta details conveying his own distinct expression of the Prairie style. Among them are the Carl Schurz, Cleveland, and Tilton schools.

Hatzfeld was married to Laurette Haentze (who went by Laura), a music teacher and daughter of a prominent German family who helped Clarence in his career. He was permitted by the Board of Education to accept private commissions, and both Hatzfeld's father-in-law, Richard Haentze, and brother-in-law, Albert Haentze, hired him to design buildings for their real estate ventures. Albert and partner Charles M. Wheeler developed residences on the city's Northwest side, and Hatzfeld designed many properties for them, including more than a dozen for the landmark Villa District which advertised and that every home was "a little gem of beauty and comfort." Hatzfeld produced plans for a number of these after forming partnership with another Board of Education architect, Arthur Knox, in 1905.

In 1913, Chicago's Irving Park District hired Hatzfeld & Knox to design the Independence Park field house. This represented the first of approximately twenty park buildings that Hatzfeld produced in Chicago. The building "conveys a strong feeling of classicism through its monumentality, symmetrical layout and broad arched openings. A sense of the Prairie style is also expressed through its long horizontal outer wings, broad tiled roofs with bracketed overhanging eaves, rich brick pattern-work, and large shallow concrete urns that were originally located at both entrances to the building." It combined features of earlier field houses that were meant to provide services to poor immigrant neighborhoods and those of private athletic clubs. For instance, it had a branch of the Chicago Public Library and an indoor swimming pool. Between the late 1920s and mid 1930s, Hatzfeld designed many other field houses including those in: Athletic Field, Avondale, Gladstone, Kilbourn, Thomas Jefferson, Hollywood Park, Indian Boundary, Gladstone, Green Briar, Euguene Field, Portage, Paul Revere, and River Parks. Hatzfeld & Knox dissolved in 1915.

Along with park field houses, Masonic Temples also became one of Hatzfeld's specialties. "These tended to be large brick structures with heavy rectangular massing and well-detail facades." For many of such lodges, Hatzfeld created fanciful interiors, often relying on specific themes for each room. For instance, his 1921 Logan Square Masonic Temple (now the Armitage Baptist Church) originally had a Pompeian Ball Room, American Hall, Ionian Lounge, Norman Hall, and the Egyptian Ball Room. Hatzfeld's Masonic Temples include the Des Plaines Masonic Hall (now Stage One Theatre), and the South Side Masonic Temple as well as the Myrtle Masonic Temple (now Korean Bethel Presbyterian Church), both of which are extant in Chicago. In addition to these projects, Hatzfeld also designed the Immel State Bank at 2800 W Belmont Ave.

=== Later life and death ===
Hatzfeld's business dwindled during the Great Depression, and after closing his architectural office, he was hired by the Chicago Park District in 1935 as recreation plants and equipment technician. He was forced into mandatory retirement in 1939, and then moved to Washington, D.C., to accept the position of recreation technician for the Federal Works Administration. Hatzfeld died in Washington, D.C., in 1943.
