= Park No. 474 =

Smallest public park in Chicago, Illinois, USA

- Park No. 474 in Chicago, IL. The area of the park is only the granite slab (center).
- Interactive map of Park No. 474
- Type: Parklet
- Location: 3231 S. Dearborn St., Chicago, Illinois, US
- Coordinates: 41°50′08″N 87°37′39″W
- Area: 54 sq ft (5.0 m^{2})
- Created: 1986
- Operator: Chicago Park District

Park No. 474 is the smallest public park in Chicago, Illinois (and the smallest city park in the state), located in the Douglas community on the South Side. The area of the park is officially listed as the minimum 0.01 acres, rounded up from 54 square feet (5.0 m^{2}). The Chicago Park District refers to Park No. 474 as a "parklet", but unlike other American parklets, the park is a permanent space away from sidewalks and listed as an independent park in the city records. It is within the historic Black Metropolis–Bronzeville District in Chicago's 4th Ward.

The passive park is situated at 3231 S. Dearborn St., located on the campus of the Illinois Institute of Technology, directly adjacent to the university's Perlstein Hall and Wishnick Hall. The park contains no natural features and two manmade features: a 6-foot-by-9-foot granite slab, which constitutes the entire area of the park, and the sculpture Man on a Bench by George Segal. The park is supervised by the nearby Williams Park's management.

== History and specifications ==
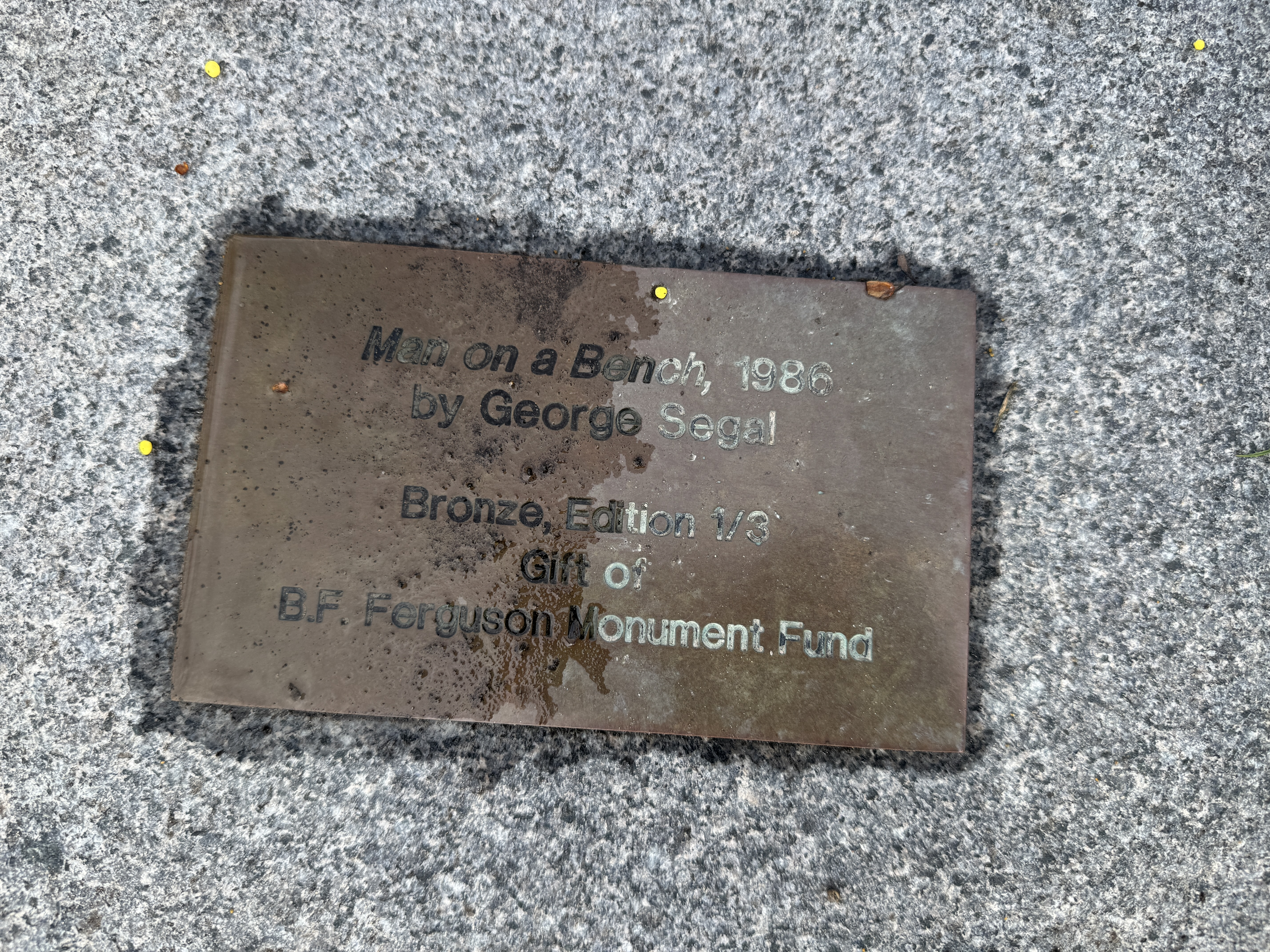
The plaque on the ground at Park No. 474. The plaque reads: "Man on a Bench, 1986 by George Segal. Bronze, Edition 1/3 Gift of B.F. Ferguson Monument Fund".

Despite its small size, Park No. 474 is officially listed on city maps and included in the Chicago Park District's roster of parks. The small plot of land was gifted to the city of Chicago from the Illinois Institute of Technology in 1986. Park No. 474 came into existence because the sculpture that takes up most of the park's area, Man on a Bench, was required to be on public land due to the funding rules by the commissioning fund. Therefore, in the same year the sculpture was installed, the university deeded the park permanently to the city.

The park is the smallest park of the more than 600 parks in Chicago, and within the 360 park districts in the state of Illinois. Though the smallest park in Illinois, the park is not the smallest when compared to a wider geographic area: Mill Ends Park in Oregon is the smallest in the US, and Japan has the world's smallest park.

The park is designated as a "passive park" by the city, defined as "a landscaped park without indoor or outdoor facilities for active recreation ... such a park may have fixtures and accessory uses, such as parking, benches, paths, walkways and drinking fountains." The park is not listed as a "pocket park" by the city, a common miniature park designation used by park districts, even though the Chicago park district does enable investments into community-created pocket parks. The park is open every day from 6AM to 11PM. The city conducts no structured programming at the park.

== Man on a Bench sculpture ==
Installed at the Illinois Institute of Technology on April 14, 1986, the same year the park was acquired by the city, the Man on a Bench sculpture is the primary feature of the park. Sculptor George Segal created the piece as an homage to German-American architect Ludwig Mies van der Rohe. Mies van der Rohe was the former director of the architecture program at the university and drafted plans for over a dozen campus buildings. The sculpture was commissioned by the B.F. Ferguson Fund of the Art Institute of Chicago in honor of Mies van der Rohe's 100th birthday, which was to be placed on the university grounds he designed at the culmination of a year-long celebration for his legacy.

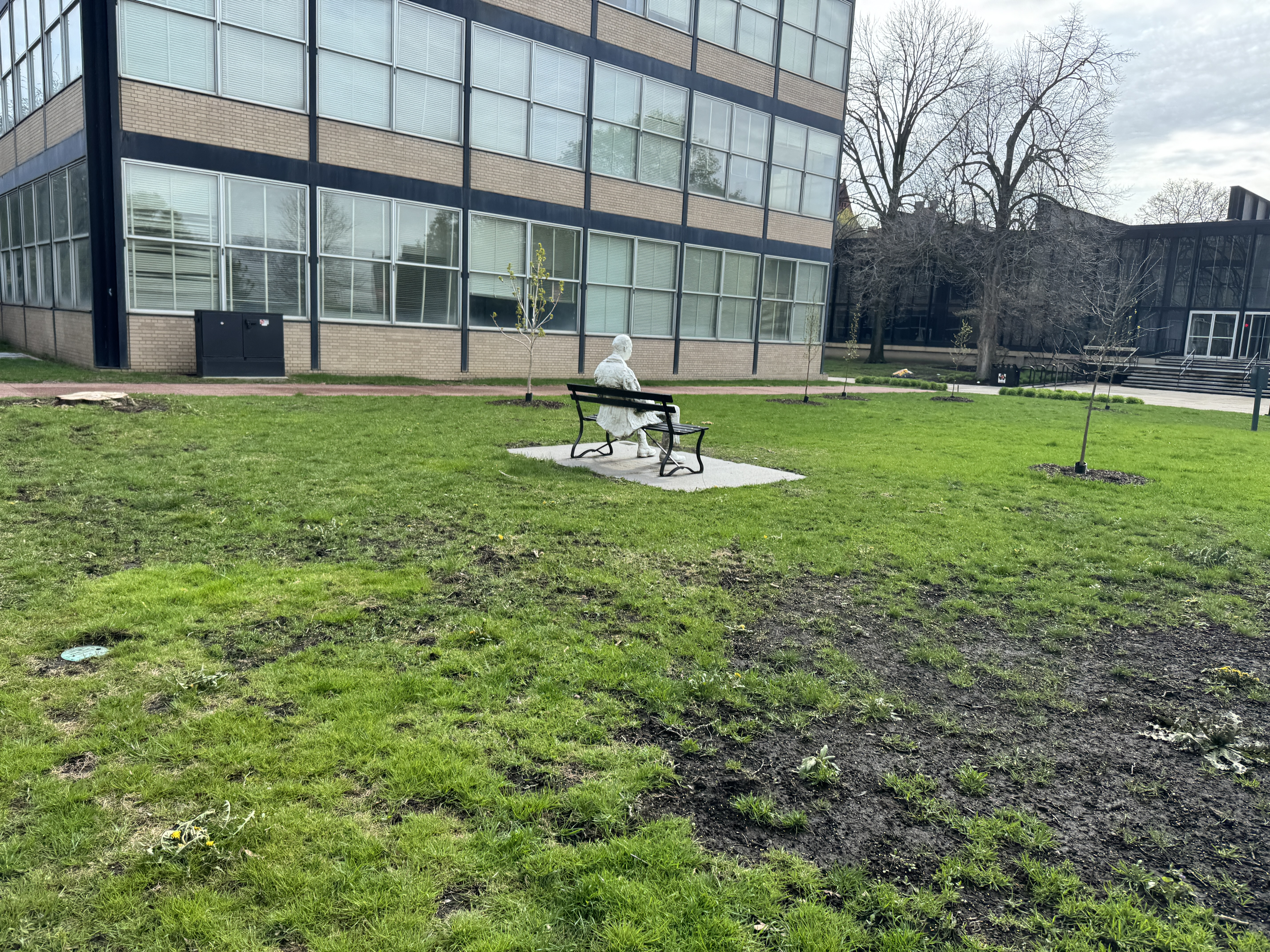
Reverse of the Man on a Bench sculpture from a distance, sitting atop Park No. 474. Wishnick Hall is in the background.

The B.F. Ferguson Fund requires any art it fully or partially funds to be placed on public land. Therefore, in order to keep the sculpture within the university grounds and receive funding for the art, the university deeded the 6 by 9 foot granite slab the sculpture was placed on to the Chicago Park District. The sculpture was the first outdoor structure at the university.

The sculpture is categorized as a "Bronze figure, painted white with epoxy on black aluminum bench with granite base", and is maintained by the Art Institute of Chicago. The sculpture consists of "a figure resembl[ing] an African American man who is sitting comfortably on a wooden bench", with half of the bench open for visitor seating. The bronze man is covered in white epoxy to resemble Segal's signature white-plaster style. It has been repaired various times over its existence, most recently in 2012 to repair the epoxy from deterioration and vandalism.

According to the university's former vice provost, the man of the sculpture has become an unofficial mascot for the university, and it is the subject of many pranks and selfies throughout the school year. For example, in 2000, graduating seniors removed the man from the bench and placed the man in the university president's office. The president dubbed it the "best student prank of the century."
