= Kakita River =

Coordinates: 35°05′54″N 138°54′01″E

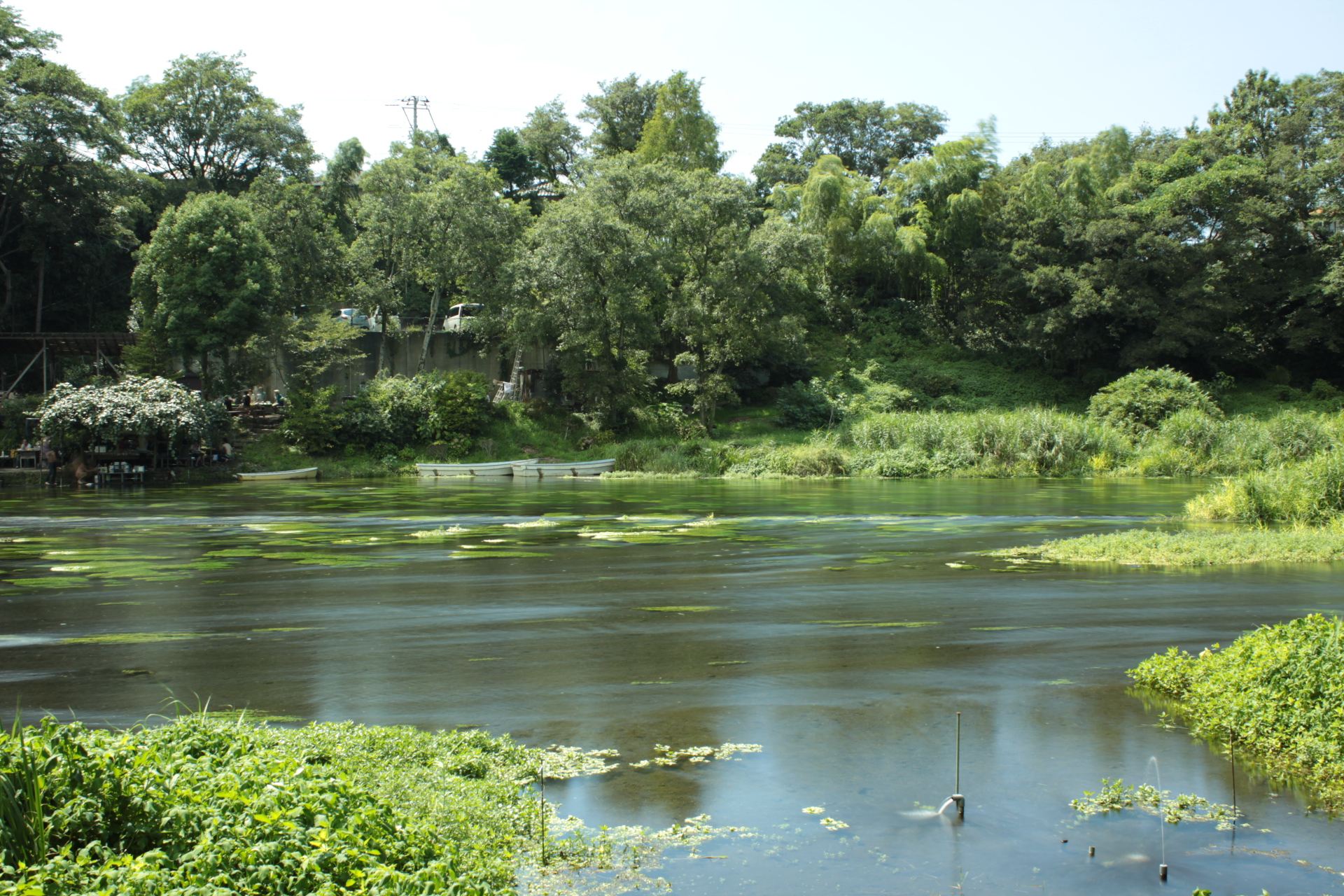

- Native name: 柿田川 (Japanese)

Location
- Country: Japan

Physical characteristics
- Length: 1.2 km (0.75 mi)

The Kakita River (柿田川, Kakita-gawa) is a river flowing through the town of Shimizu in the Suntō District, Shizuoka Prefecture, Japan.

The Kakita River is a tributary of the Kano River. At only 1.2 km (1 mi), it is the shortest Class 1 River in Japan.

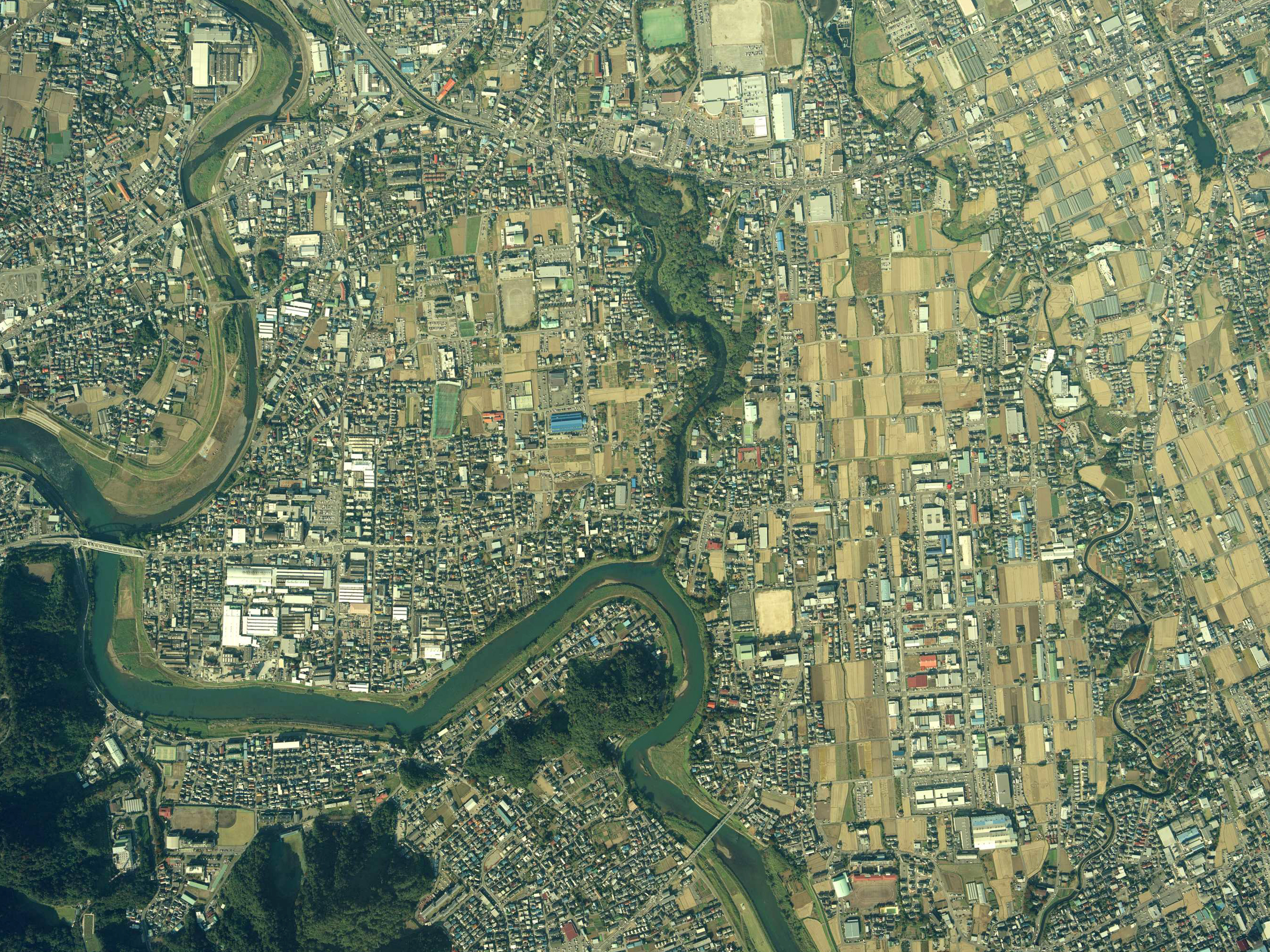
Kakita River (Center) and Kano River (Below)

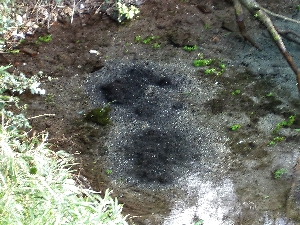
Kakitagawa springs, source of the Kakita river

Most of the river's source water comes from springs created by rainfall and melting snow on Mount Fuji. Therefore, the temperature of the river is around 15 °C throughout the year. The river is also known as the only habitat of Mishima-baikamo (ja:ミシマバイカモ). The area around the springs is protected as a park (Kakita River Park (柿田川公園, Kakita-gawa Kōen) by the Shimizu town government.

Also, famous for being a clear-flowing river, the Kakita River has been named one of the "Three Clear-Flowing Rivers in Japan", along with the Nagara River in Gifu Prefecture and the Shimanto River in Kōchi Prefecture.
