= Square foot =

Imperial unit and U.S. customary unit of area

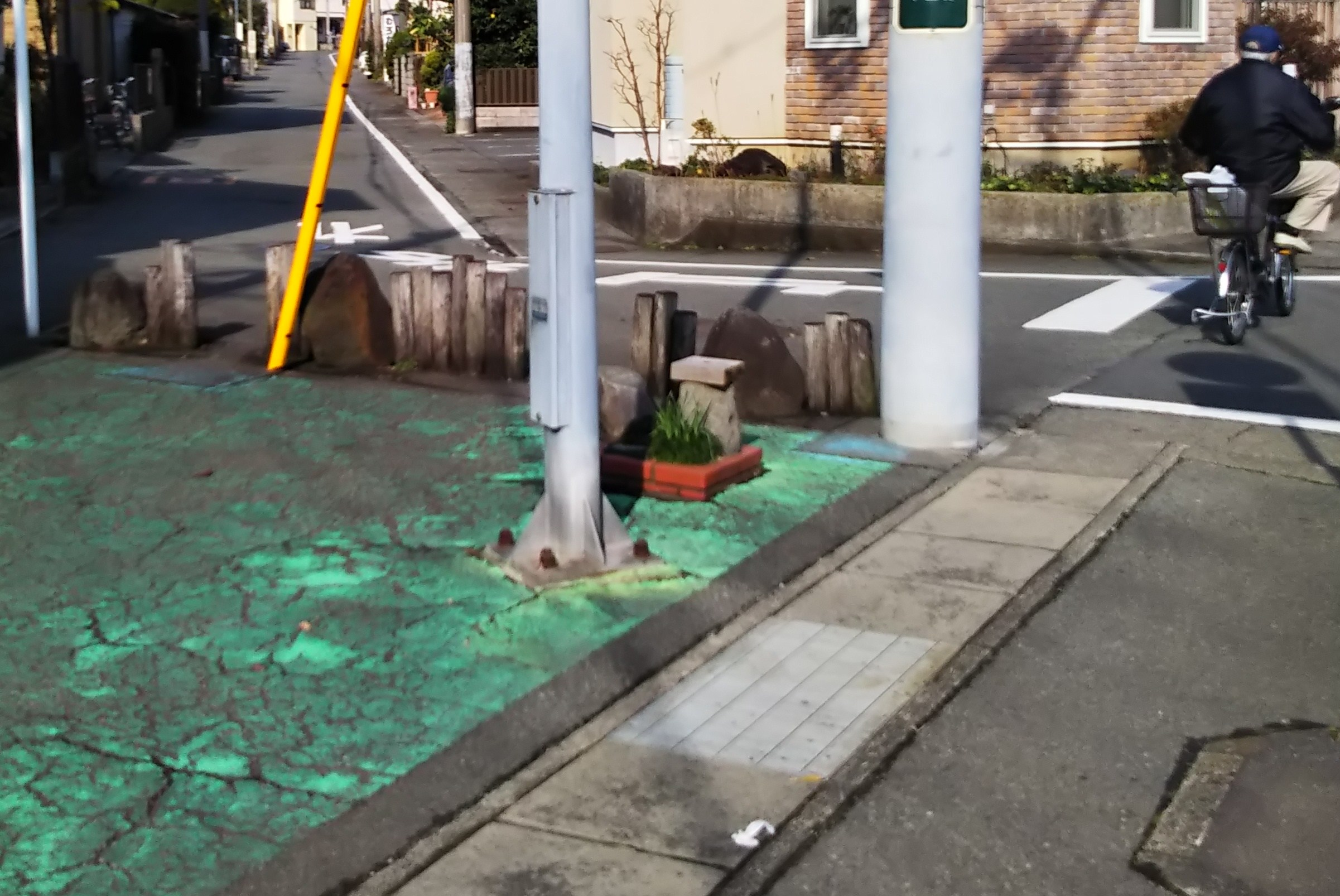
- The world's smallest park, which is 2.6 square feet (0.24 m^{2}) in area

General information
- Unit system: Imperial, United States customary units
- Unit of: area
- Symbol: ft^{2}, sq ft

Conversions
1 ft^{2} in ...	... is equal to ...
- Imperial/US: 144 sq in; 1/9 sq yd
- SI units: 929.0304 cm^{2}; 0.09290304 m^{2}

Comparison of 1 square foot with some Imperial and metric units of area

The square foot (pl. square feet; abbreviated sq ft, sf, or ft^{2}; also denoted by ´^{^{2}} and ⏍) is an imperial unit and U.S. customary unit (non-SI, non-metric) of area, used mainly in the United States, Canada, the United Kingdom, Bangladesh, India, Nepal, Pakistan, Ghana, Liberia, Malaysia, Myanmar, Singapore and Hong Kong. It is defined as the area of a square with sides of 1 foot.

Although the pluralization is regular in the noun form, when used as an adjective, the singular is preferred. So, an apartment measuring 700 square feet could be described as a 700 square-foot apartment. This corresponds to common linguistic usage of foot.

The square foot unit is commonly used in real estate. Dimensions are generally taken with a laser device, the latest in a long line of tools used to gauge the size of apartments or other spaces. Real estate agents often measure straight corner-to-corner, then deduct non-heated spaces, and add heated spaces whose footprints exceed the end-to-end measurement.

== Conversion to other units ==
1 square feet equals to:

- 1/27,878,400 ≈ 0.0000000358701 square miles (mi^{2})
- 1/43,560 ≈ 0.000022956341 acre (ac)
- 1/9 ≈ 0.111111111111 square yard (yd^{2})
- 144 square inches (in^{2})
- 0.000009290304 hectare (ha)
- 0.0009290304 are (a, uncommon)
- 0.09290304 square meters (m^{2})
- 9.290304 square decimeters (dm^{2}, uncommon)
- 929.0304 square centimeters (cm^{2})
- 92,903.04 square millimeters (mm^{2})

== See also ==
- Area (geometry)
- Conversion of units
- Cubic foot
- Metrication in Canada
- Miscellaneous Technical (Unicode) for a list of miscellaneous technical symbols and fonts which support the square foot symbol ⟨⏍⟩
- Orders of magnitude (area)
- Square (algebra), square root
