= Lakeview Place =

Park in Seattle, Washington, U.S.

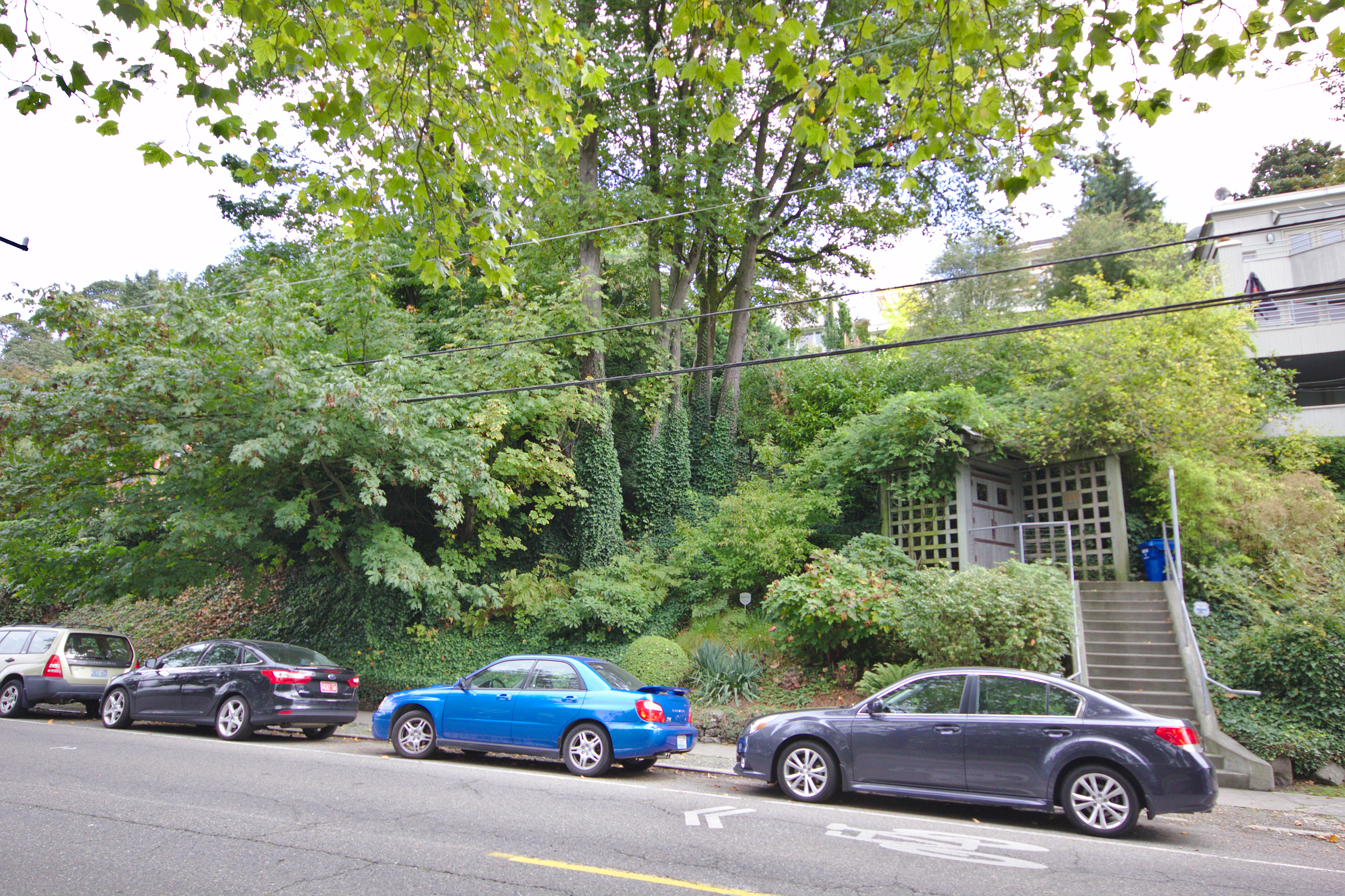
- The location of Lakeview Place, as seen from Lakeview Blvd E
- Type: Urban Park
- Location: Seattle, Washington
- Coordinates: 47.62940°N 122.32572°W
- Area: 185-square-foot (17.2 m^{2})
- Operated by: Seattle Parks and Recreation

Lakeview Place is a 185-square-foot (17.2 m^{2}) park in Seattle, Washington. According to the city parks department as of 2013, it was the smallest park in Seattle.

== See also ==
- Mill Ends Park, the world's smallest park, in Portland, Oregon
