= Shimizu, Shizuoka =

Shimizu 清水町
- Town
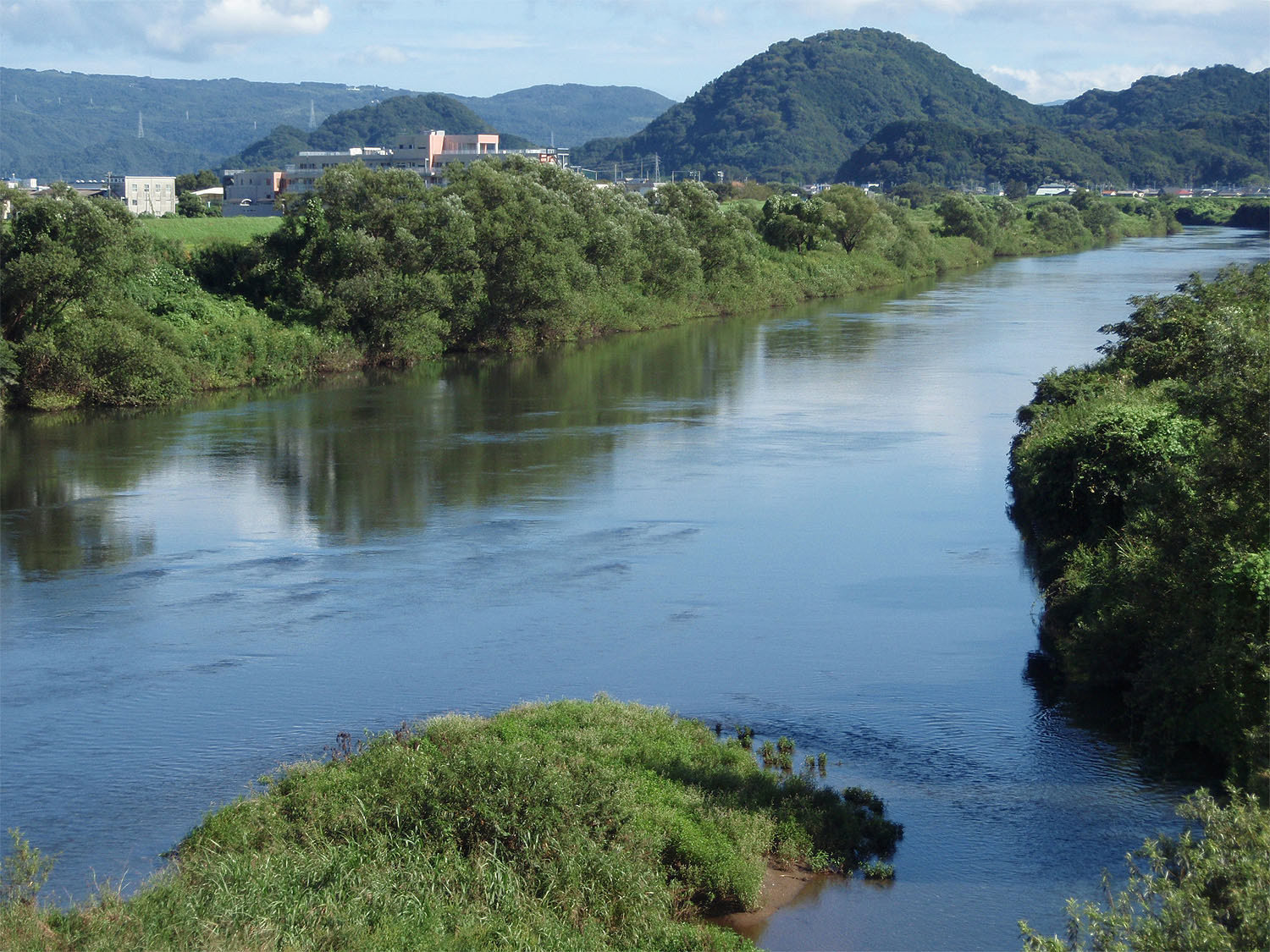
- Kano River in Shimizu Town

- Flag Seal

- Location of Shimizu Town in Shizuoka Prefecture

- Coordinates: 35°5′56.4″N 138°54′10.3″E
- Country: Japan
- Region: Chūbu; Tōkai
- Prefecture: Shizuoka
- District: Suntō

Area
  - Total: 8.81 km^{2} (3.40 sq mi)

Population (August 2019)
  - Total: 32,453
  - Density: 3,680/km^{2} (9,540/sq mi)
- Time zone: UTC+9 (Japan Standard Time)
- City symbols
  - Tree: Castanopsis
  - Flower: Chrysanthemum
  - Bird: Common kingfisher
- Phone number: 055-973-1111
- Address: 210-1 Dōniwa, Shimizu-chō, Suntō-gun, Shizuoka-ken 411-8650
- Website: Official website

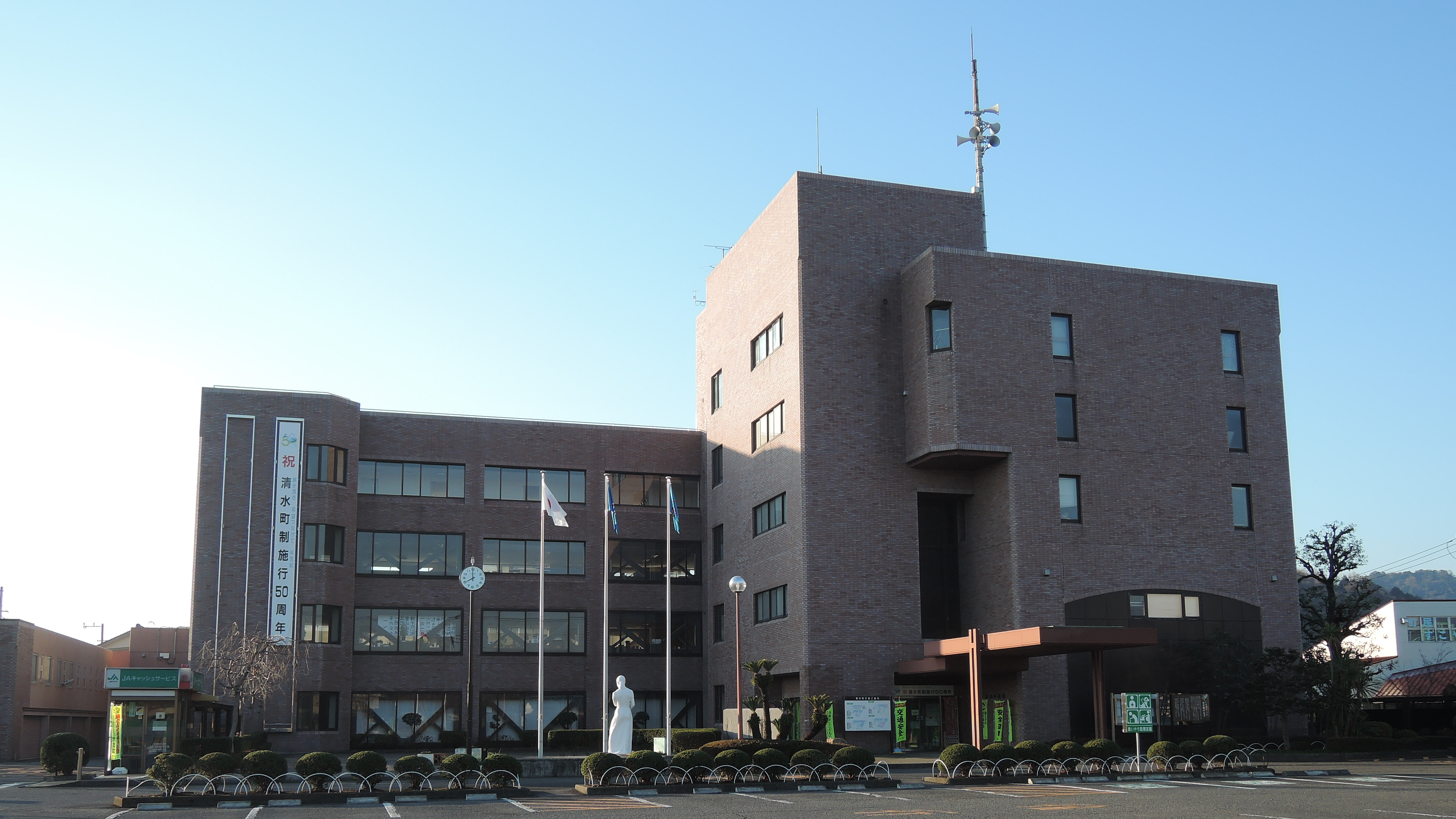
Shimizu Town Hall

Shimizu (清水町, Shimizu-chō) is a town in Suntō District of Shizuoka Prefecture, Japan. As of 1 August 2019, the town had an estimated population of 32,453 in 14058 households, and a population density of 3,700 persons per km^{2}. The total area of the town was 8.81 square kilometres (3.40 sq mi). One of its most notable features is the spectacular view of Mt. Fuji on clear days.

== Geography ==
Shimizu is located at the northern end of Izu Peninsula. Both the Kakita River and the Kano River flow through the town. The area has a temperate maritime climate with hot, humid summers and mild, cool winters.

== Neighboring municipalities ==
- Shizuoka Prefecture
  - Numazu
  - Mishima
  - Nagaizumi

== Demographics ==
Per Japanese census data, the population of Shimizu has been increasing over the past 70 years.

Historical population
Year	Pop.	±%
1940	6,033	—
1950	8,859	+46.8%
1960	10,841	+22.4%
1970	21,036	+94.0%
1980	26,408	+25.5%
1990	27,755	+5.1%
2000	30,870	+11.2%
2010	32,304	+4.6%

== Climate ==
The city has a climate characterized by hot and humid summers, and relatively mild winters (Köppen climate classification Cfa). The average annual temperature in Shimizu is 15.8 °C. The average annual rainfall is 1925 mm with September as the wettest month. The temperatures are highest on average in August, at around 26.6 °C, and lowest in January, at around 5.8 °C.

== History ==
Shimizu is located in the far eastern portion of former Suruga Province, and was largely tenryō territory under direct control of the Tokugawa shogunate in the Edo period. With the establishment of the modern municipalities system of the early Meiji period in 1889, the area was reorganized into the village of Shimizu within Suntō District, Shizuoka through the merger of 11 small hamlets.

Shimizu attained town status in 1963. There have been numerous unsuccessful attempts to merge Shimizu into neighboring Numazu (1966, 1967, 1996, 2003, 2004, 2006 and 2007).

== Economy ==
The economy of Shimizu is largely based on agriculture. The town also serves as a bedroom community for the industrial zones in neighboring Numazu and Mishima.

== Education ==
Shimizu has three public elementary schools and two public junior high schools operated by the town government. The town has one public high school operated by the Shizuoka Prefectural Board of Education.

== Transportation ==
=== Railway ===
Shimizu station is on the Tokaido line, with frequent services towards Shizuoka or Atami.

=== Highway ===
- National Route 1

== Mascot ==
Yusui-kun, the town's mascot

Shimizu's mascot is Yusui-kun (ゆうすいくん). He is an elf who lives in the Kakita River. He wears a Mount Fuji-like hat and a cape with Kakita River and Mishimabaikamo flower motifs. His uniform has a pocket that can store green rice (a special kind of rice) and several books. Depending on the season, he changes his hat (white and green for spring, green for summer, white and brown for fall and white for winter) and his gloves and boots (red for spring, blue for summer, brown for fall and white for winter). His job is a park ranger. As a park ranger, he must protect the Kakita River (and nature in general) while making everyone's dreams come true. Because of his handsome looks as a park ranger, he is nicknamed the "Cute Hero" (かわいいヒーロー, Kawaī hīrō). He is unveiled on 11 May 2013.

== Sister cities ==
- Miaoli City, Taiwan, since 2003
- Squamish, British Columbia, Canada

== Notable people from Shimizu, Shizuoka ==
- Nagasawa Katsutate (1858–1940) – Shinto priest and spiritual teacher
- Yuki Sato – long-distance runner
- Takehiro Ishikawa – played in Nippon Professional Baseball (NPB) for the Yokohama DeNA BayStars.
- Suguru Iwazaki – 4-time NPB All Star for the Hanshin Tigers

== Local attractions ==
- Kakita River
