= Waldo Park =

Municipal park in Salem, Oregon, U.S.

Coordinates: 44.94363°N 123.02791°W

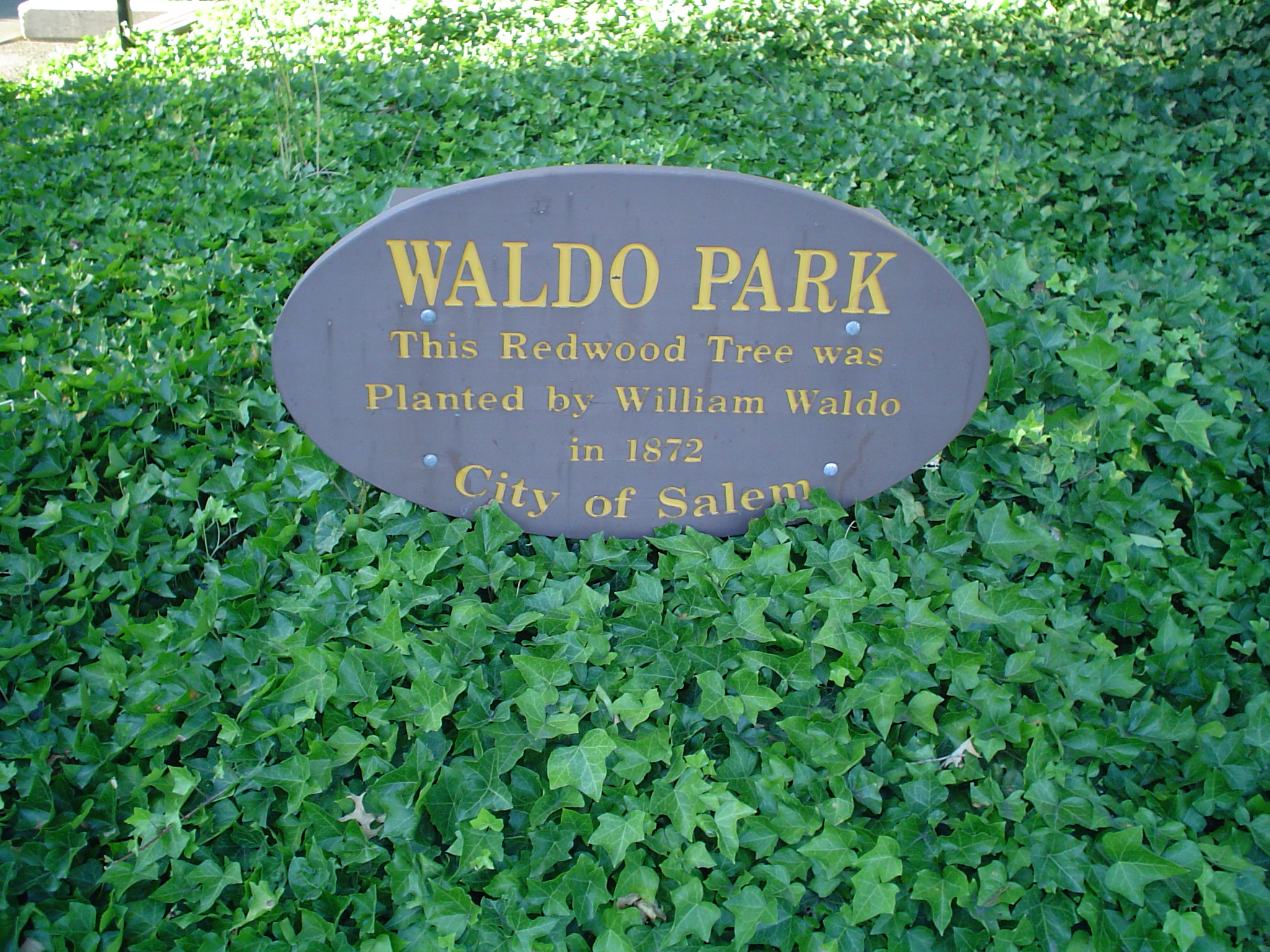
- Interactive map of Waldo Park
- Location: Salem, Oregon, U.S.

Waldo Park is a municipal park, located in downtown Salem, Oregon, United States. It is one of the smallest city parks in the world, measuring 12 by 20 feet (3.7 by 6.1 m). The park consists of a giant sequoia (one of the biggest tree species in the world) surrounded by landscaping and marked with a plaque and sign.

The park is named for the 19th-century lawyer and Marion County judge William Waldo, who planted the tree on his property in 1872. Waldo later sold his property to the city, under condition that the tree be preserved. In 1936, the tree was made into a city park as a result of activism by the American War Mothers, with the support of prominent Salem citizens.

The tree is located at the intersection of Union and Summer streets, with Summer Street, a major Salem thoroughfare, temporarily reduced in width to make room for the tree. The tree currently reaches a height of 82 feet (25 m). It is a designated Oregon Heritage Tree.

== Gallery ==
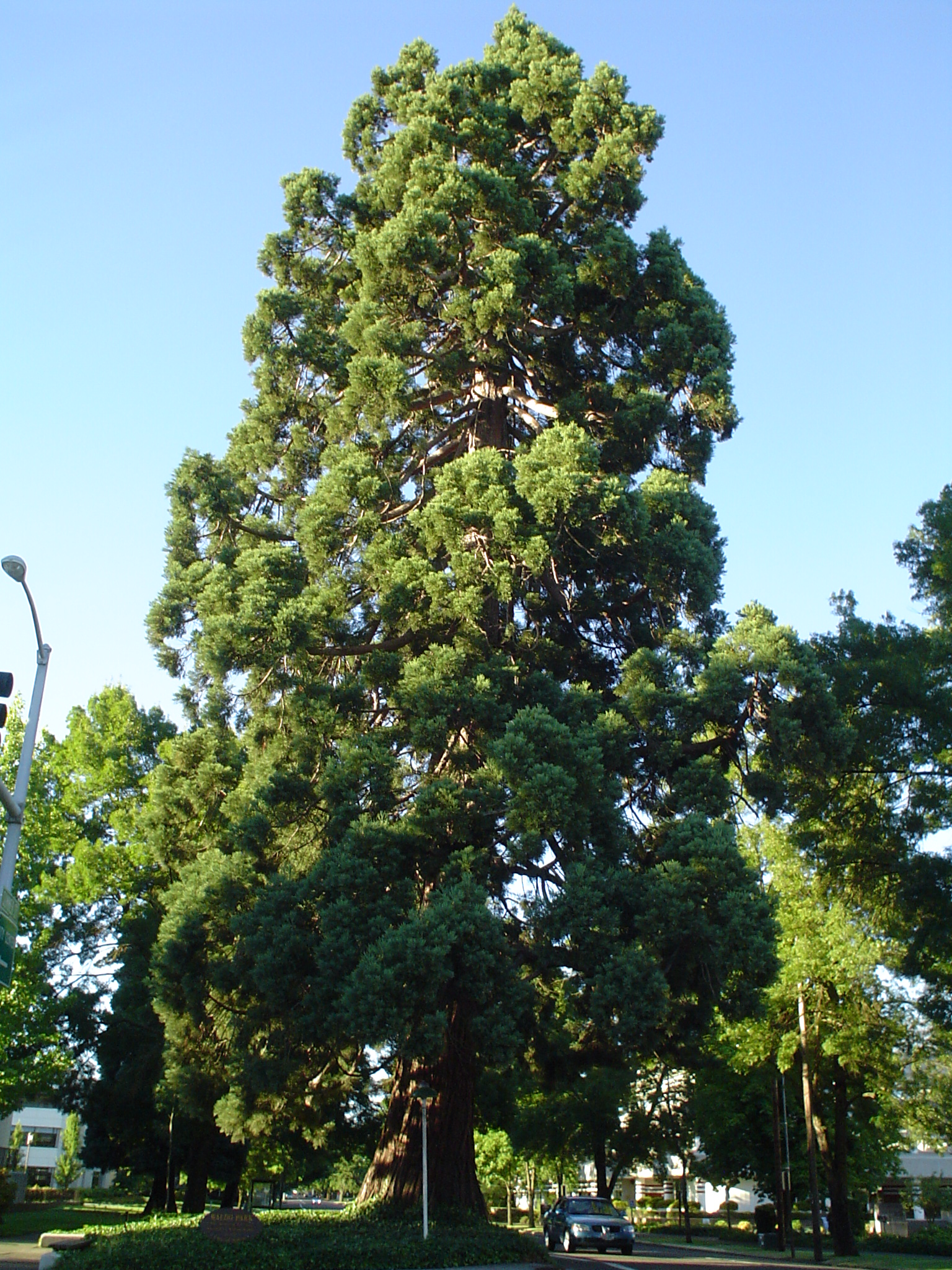

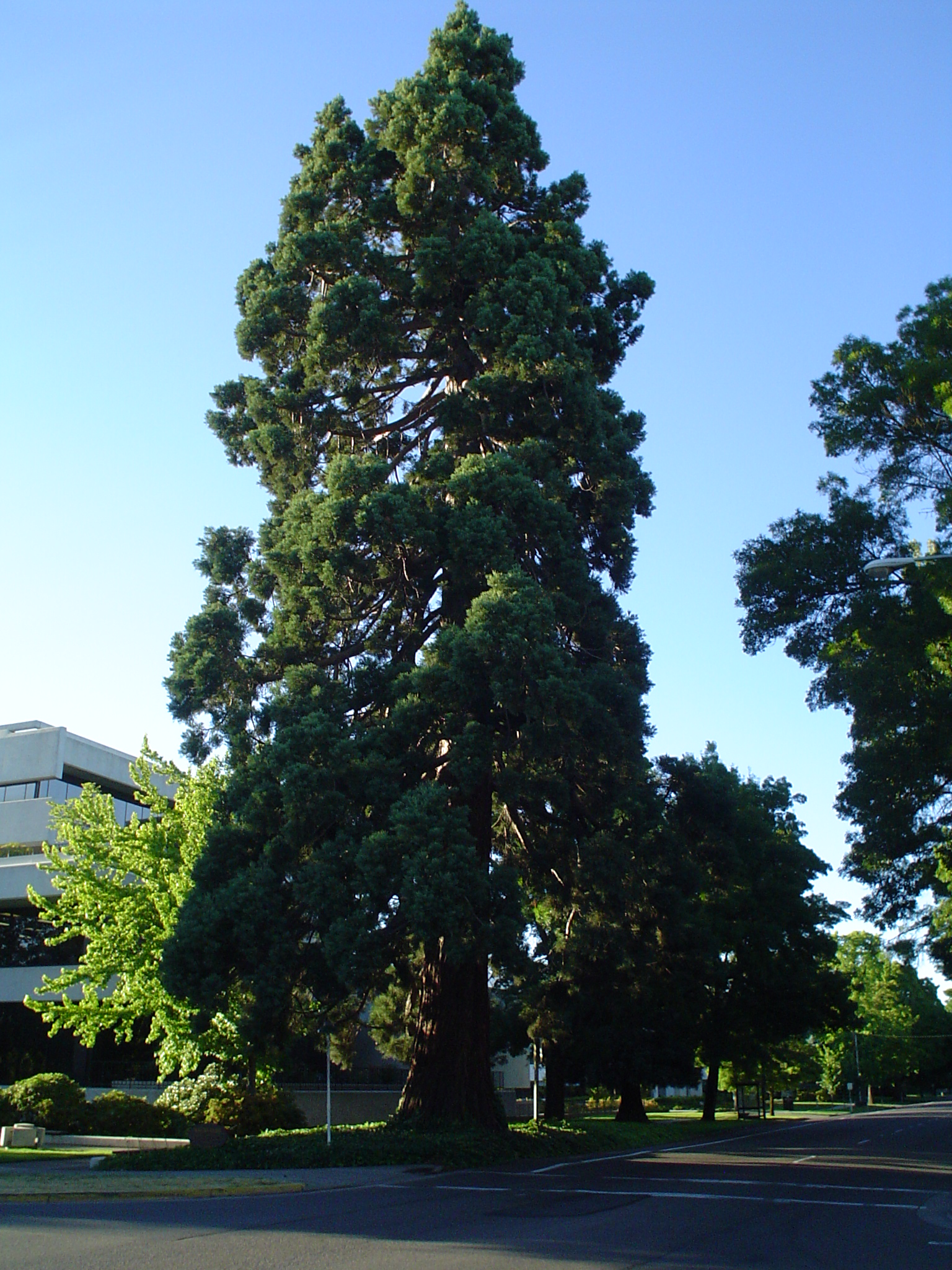

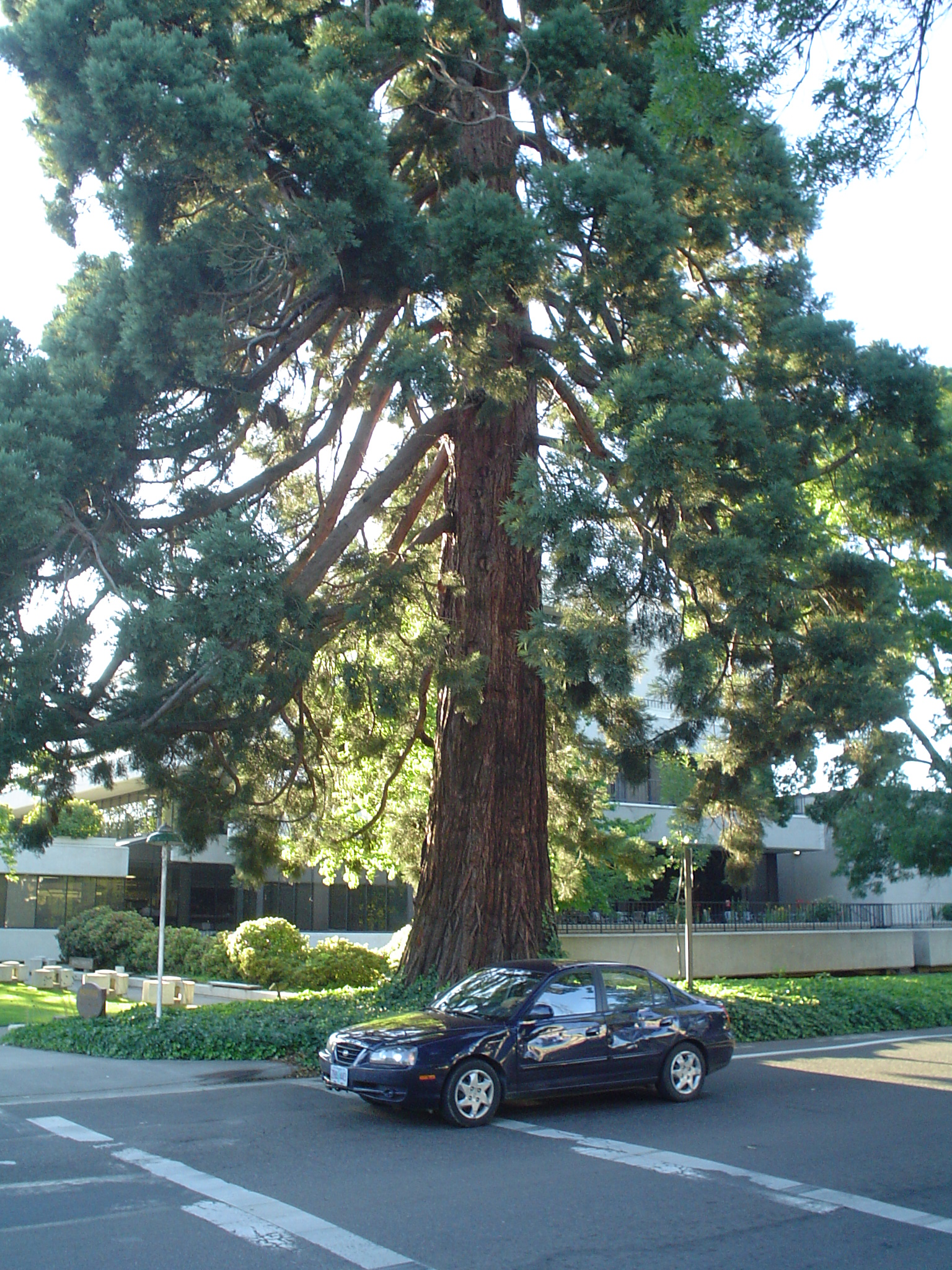

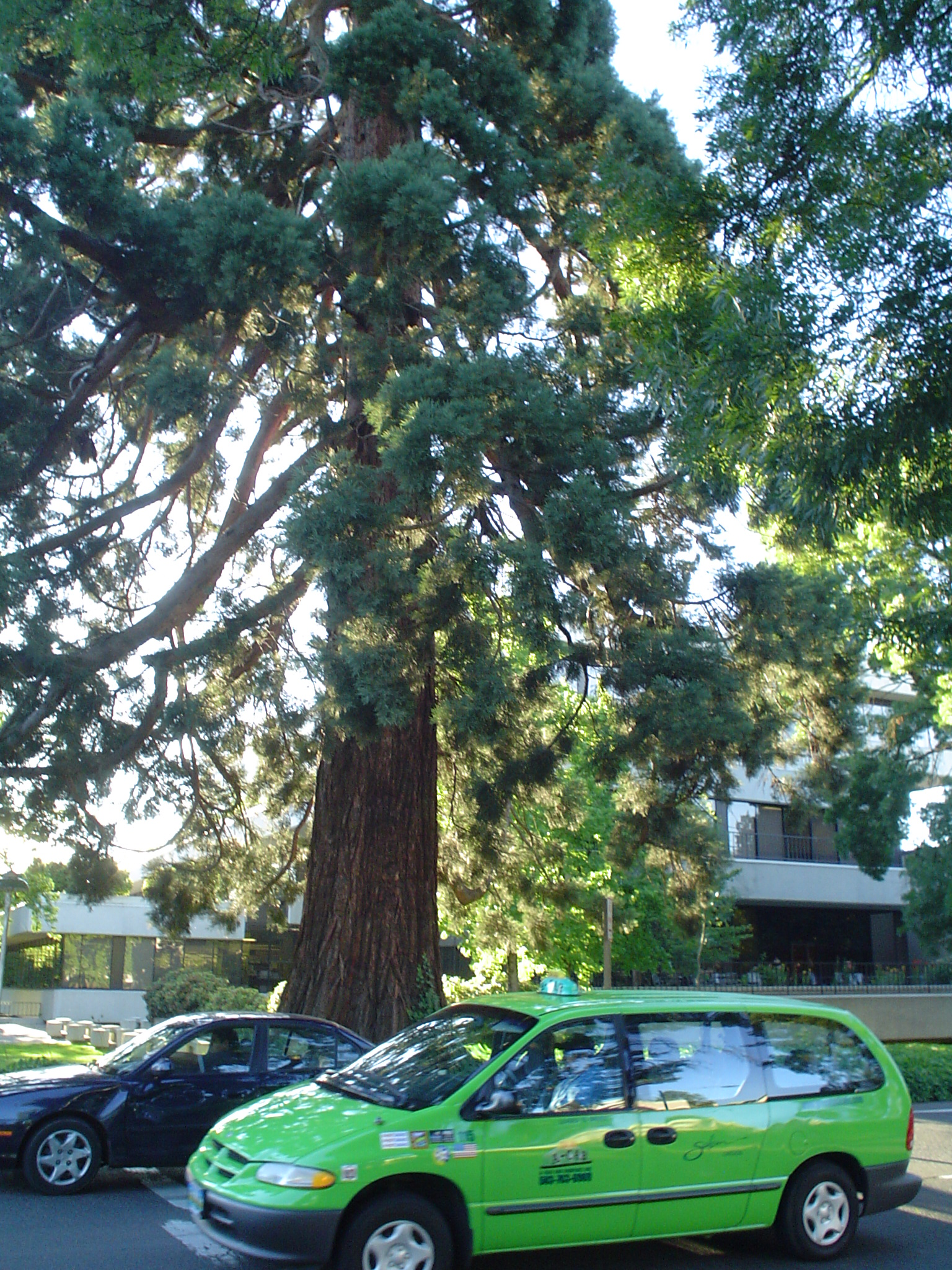

== See also ==
- Mill Ends Park, located in nearby Portland, formerly the smallest park in the world (now the second smallest, after the one in Japan)
