= Saint Patrick's Day in Portland, Oregon =

Annual community festival

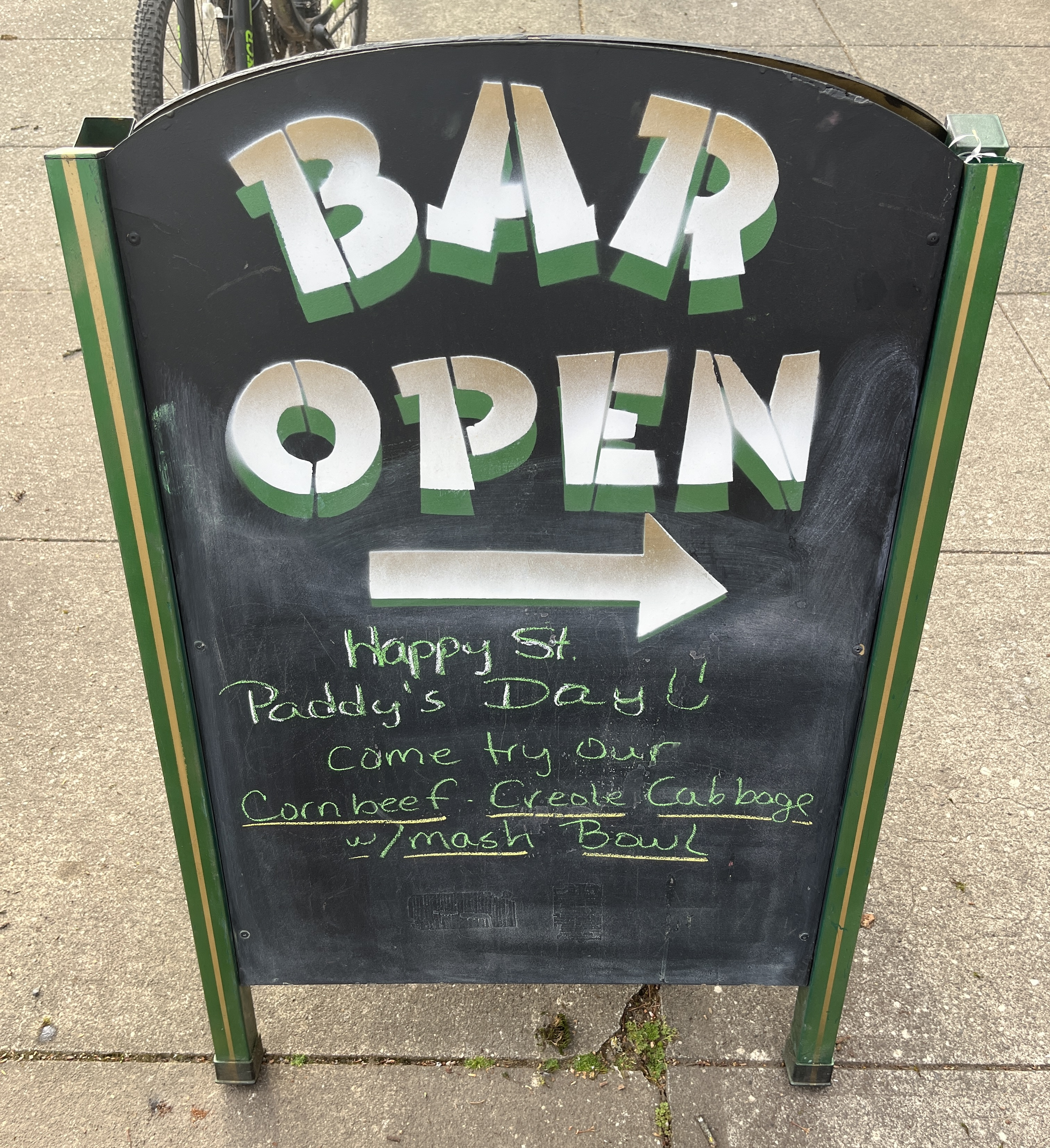
Sign outside the Delta Cafe in the Woodstock neighborhood of Southeast Portland, promoting a special menu item to commemorate Saint Patrick's Day in 2026

Saint Patrick's Day is a holiday celebrated annually in Portland, Oregon. In 2017, Brooke Jackson-Glidden and Chad Walsh of Eater Portland wrote: "Sure, Portland isn't Boston, with its street brawls and legit black pudding, but we hold our own. Portland's festivities range from quiet highballs of whiskey to green Jell-O shots, with all the expected bagpipes and bangers." In 2025, writers for Portland Monthly said: "In March, just about every bar in town with an O' or a Mc in its name hosts some kind of St. Patrick's Day party."

== Events ==
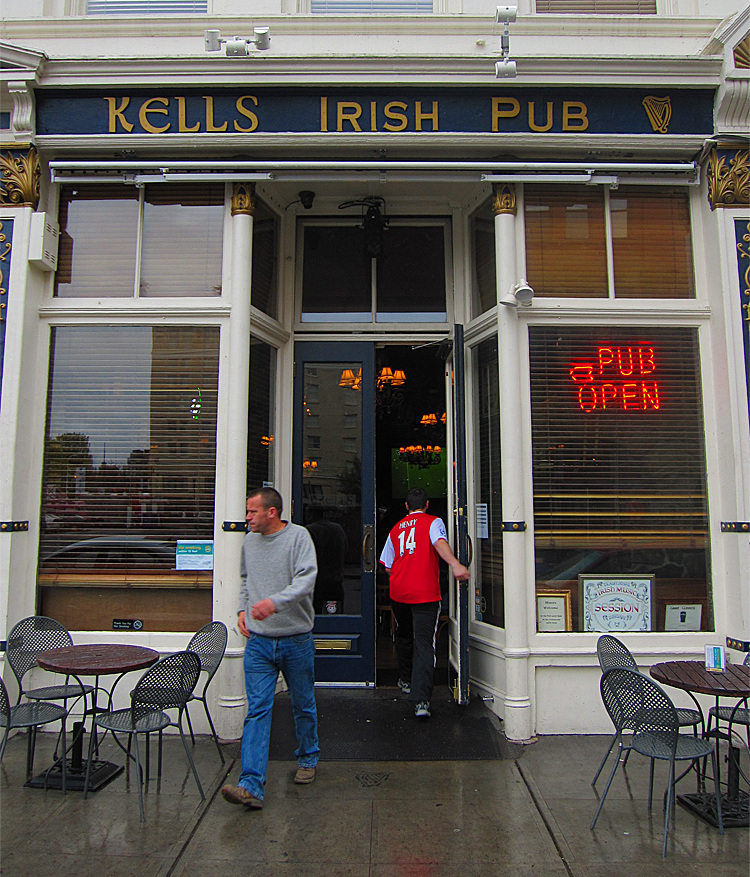
Exterior of Kells Irish Pub, 2010

Many bars and restaurants host themed events. Kells Irish Pub and Kells Brewery host the Kells Irish Festival at Tom McCall Waterfront Park. Activities include boxing matches and live music. Paddy's St. Patrick's Day Festival has food specials, Irish dancers, live music, bagpipers, and whiskey tastings. The 2021 event was scaled down because of the COVID-19 pandemic. In 2023, the fourteenth iteration of the event included a successful attempt to create the world's largest Irish coffee. Proceeds from the festival have benefited the Children's Cancer Association. Portland Monthly called these "raucous, weekend-long" celebrations. Other local establishments with celebrations have included EastBurn, Jake's Famous Crawfish, Kennedy School, Multnomah Whiskey Library, and the defunct Raven & Rose.

The Portland Spirit features Irish dancing and music on its annual Shamrock Cruise. The All-Ireland Cultural Society hosts an annual St. Patrick's Day Celebration with bagpipes, dancing, drums, live music, and Irish food and drinks. The 2022 event was virtual because of the pandemic and featured Irish dancers, musicians, and singers. The "St. Agatha Catholic School's Sellwood and Moreland St. Patrick's Day Parade and Festival" is held annually but experienced a hiatus during the COVID-19 pandemic.

National bar crawl brand Barcrawlerz hosted a "Kiss Me I'm Irish" pub crawl. The LepraCon pub crawl is organized by the team behind SantaCon; stops on the event have included Dante's and Kelly's Olympian. In 2024, the St. Patrick's Day Block Party and Pub Crawl was described as the city's largest pub crawl by Willamette Week. A "Lucky Charms" edition of Portland Night Market was held the weekend before the holiday in 2026.

Elsewhere in the Portland metropolitan area, the Dirty Leprechaun obstacle course race was held in Tualatin for six years, as of 2020.

=== Shamrock Run ===
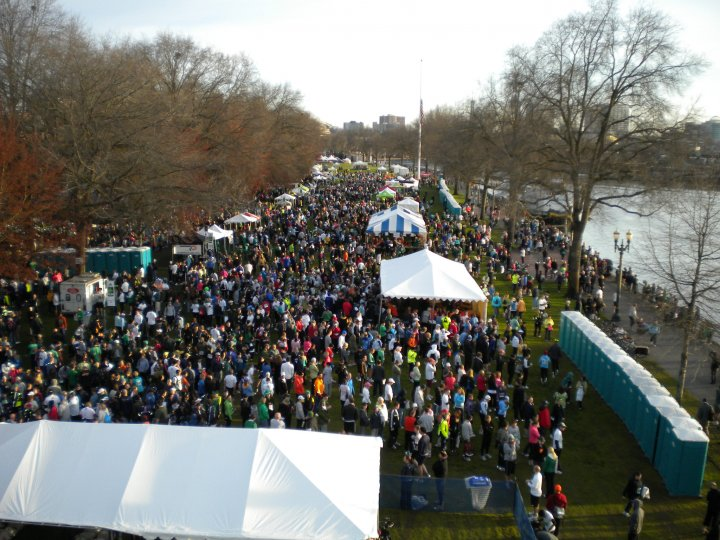
Shamrock Run at Tom McCall Waterfront Park in 2010

Established in 1979, the annual Shamrock Run is the largest running event in Oregon and the first of the year's major running events. Hannah Seibold of the Portland Tribune has said the event "[combines] a full weekend of races with a lively St. Patrick's Day–inspired festival atmosphere". Participants often wear costumes and green clothing. A festival at the finish line at Waterfront Park has live entertainment as well as food and drinks, including beer. The event includes a Leprechaun Lap for children aged 10 and younger and the Shamrock Showdown, which is a team competition among local running clubs. The Shamrock Run is a fundraiser for Doernbecher Children's Hospital.

Approximately 20,000 people participated in 2019 and 2023, and the event has seen as many as 25,000 participants. The 2020 and 2021 events were canceled because of the pandemic. The 2022 event had approximately 15,000 participants. Approximately 20,000 people participated in 2026.

=== St. Paddy's Day Parade ===
The family-friendly St. Paddy's Day Parade in Northeast Portland features dancing, live music, pipers, and other activities traditionally associated with Saint Patrick's Day. The event was canceled in 2020 and 2021 because of the pandemic. In 2024, The Oregonian said: "It's the 35th year for this annual parade that kicks off at Fernwood/Cleary Elementary School. Expect decorated floats, Portland community groups, a drum line, bagpipers, team mascots, kids on bikes and a color guard."

== Law enforcement and ridesharing programs ==
The Portland Police Bureau and other local law enforcement agencies have partnered to increase patrols around the holiday to reduce drunk driving. The 2024 operation yielded approximately 1,600 traffic stops, 950 citations, and 75 arrests for speeding, distracted driving, and driving under the influence. The Portland Bureau of Transportation (PBOT) has also provided Safe Ride Home coupons to encourage ridesharing. The Safe Ride Home program launched in 2017 and has also been used for Cinco de Mayo and New Year's Eve.

== Mill Ends Park ==
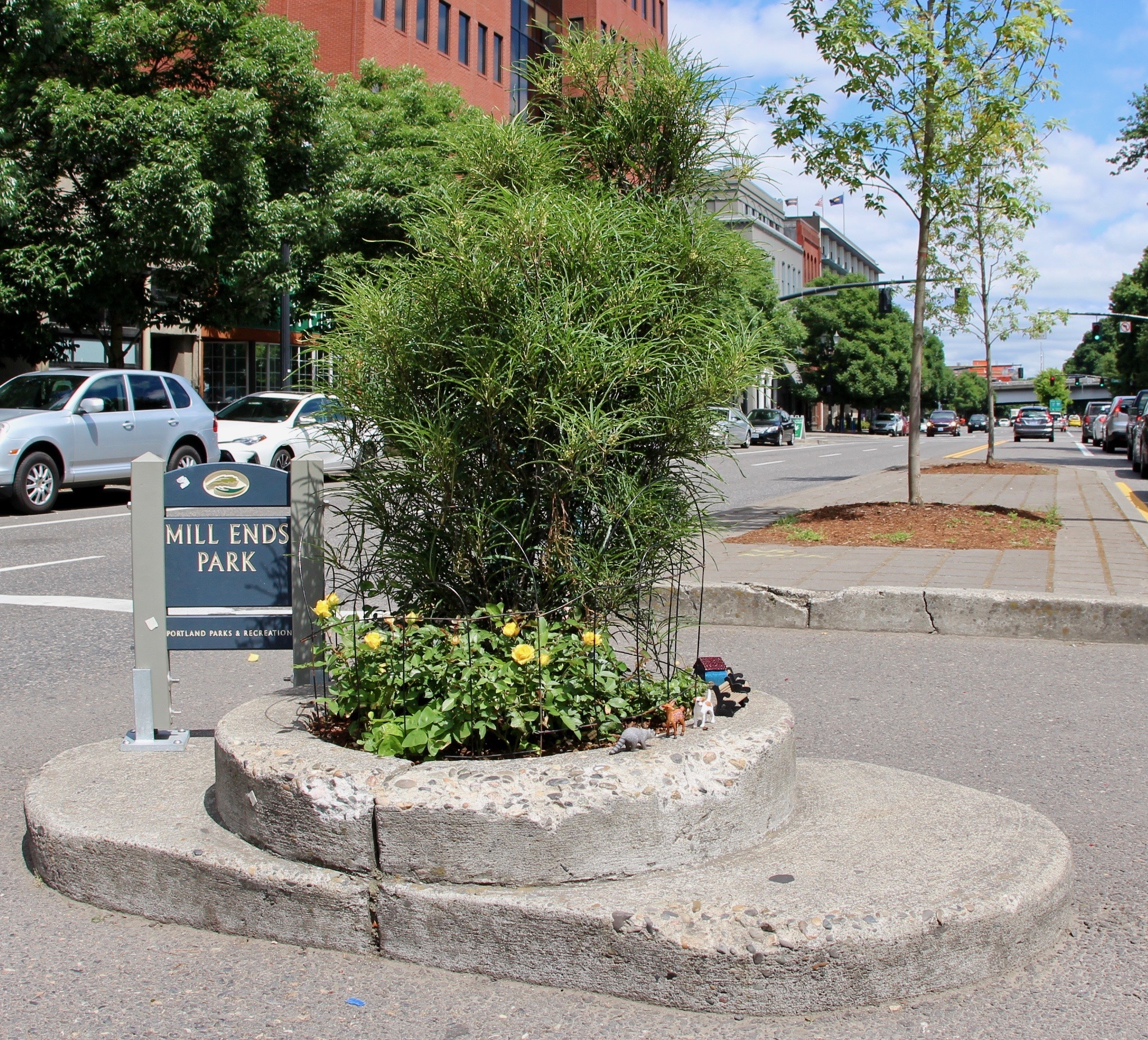
Mill Ends Park in 2018

Mill Ends Park has ties to Irish folklore and Saint Patrick's Day. After The Oregon Journal reporter Dick Fagan began telling the tale of a leprechaun named Patrick O'Toole who dug the hole for the park, it became, according to KGW, "a place of imagination, hosting annual snail races on St. Patrick's Day, attracting cowboy visitors who planted a Texas Rose, and even featuring a miniature Ferris wheel lowered in by crane for its resident leprechauns."

In 2021, The Oregonian said: "When crews were working on the nearby Hawthorne Bridge, they used an actual, full-sized crane to install a 5-inch Ferris wheel at the park. St. Patrick's Day was regular cause for celebration at Mill Ends Park ... The Portland Rainmakers, a city ambassador group that was essentially a rowdier version of the Royal Rosarians, took part in the park's shenanigans. Dick Fagan had a long-standing, good-natured feud with a local bagpiper troupe, who always came out to play the pipes on St. Patrick's Day. The mayor and other city dignitaries would attend the celebration."

After Fagan died in 1969, the newspaper published a cartoon of a leprechaun in the park holding a shamrock. Portland formally adopted Mill Ends Park as an official city park on Saint Patrick's Day in 1976, five years after receiving "world's smallest park" status from the Guinness World Records. Fagan's family gathers at the park each Saint Patrick's Day to remember him.

== See also ==
- Culture of Portland, Oregon
- Irish culture in the United States
- Saint Patrick's Day in the United States
