= Prince's Park, Burntwood =

Park in Staffordshire, England

Coordinates: 52°40′47″N 1°53′44″W

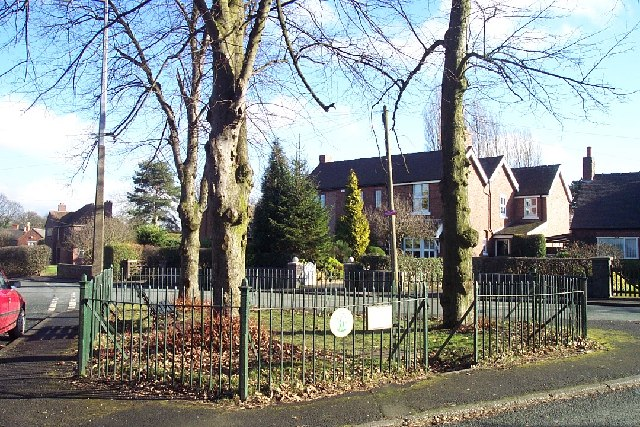
Prince's Park, Burntwood

Prince's Park is located in the Staffordshire town of Burntwood and is featured in the Guinness Book of Records for being the smallest park in the United Kingdom.

It was created to commemorate the marriage of Albert Edward, Prince of Wales, and Princess Alexandra of Denmark.

There are three trees within its grounds named Faith, Hope and Charity.

In May 2013, the park was the venue for the World's Shortest Fun Run.

== See also ==
- Mill Ends Park, Portland, Oregon
