= Takehiro Ishikawa =

Japanese baseball player (born 1986)

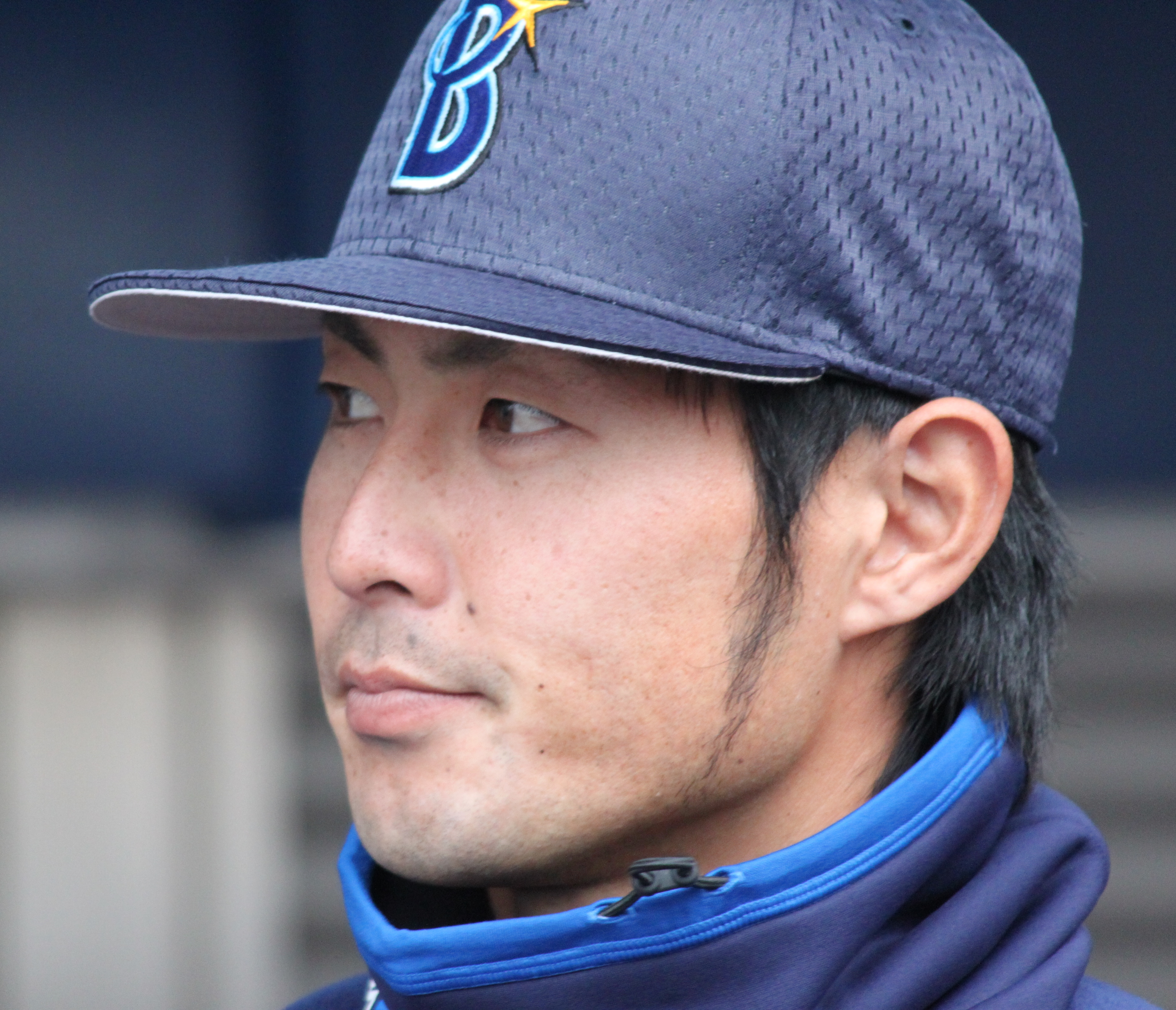
- Ishikawa with the Yokohama DeNA BayStars
- Infielder
- Born: July 10, 1986 (age 39); Suntō District, Shizuoka, Japan
- Bats: Left Throws: Right

NPB debut
- October 12, 2006, for the Yokohama BayStars

Career statistics
- Batting average: .256
- Home runs: 23
- Runs batted in: 224
- Stats at Baseball Reference

Teams
- Yokohama BayStars/Yokohama DeNA BayStars (2005–2020)

Takehiro Ishikawa (石川 雄洋, Ishikawa Takehiro; born July 10, 1986) is a Japanese former professional baseball player who played in Nippon Professional Baseball (NPB) for the Yokohama DeNA BayStars.

== Career ==
Yokohama BayStars selected Ishikawa with the sixth selection in the 2004 NPB draft.

On October 12, 2006, Ishikawa made his NPB debut.

On December 2, 2020, he become a free agent.
