= Fuji Bamboo Garden =

Botanical garden of Bamboo in Japan

Coordinates: 35°09′40″N 138°53′17″E

The Fuji Bamboo Garden (富士竹類植物園 Fuji Chikurui Shokubutsuen?) is Japan’s only botanical garden specializing in bamboo. Fuji Bamboo Garden is located in Nagaizumi, which is part of Japan's Shizuoka Prefecture (southwest of Tokyo). The garden is located at the base of Mount Fuji, from where the garden's name originated. The garden occupies over 2 acres of land. Fuji Bamboo Garden is said to be the world’s largest collection of bamboo, holding more than 450 varieties of bamboo from all around the world. The garden contains approximately 100,000 bamboo plants. The types of bamboo in the garden range from black bamboo to moso bamboo. The garden has benches to sit on, as well as bamboo sheds each holding a special type of bamboo.

Fuji Bamboo Garden is not only a garden, but also has a museum full of bamboo art and history brought from all over the world, such as musical instruments from Indonesia, woven bamboo baskets from Africa, blankets made from bamboo, bamboo fishing gear and even furniture made from bamboo. The garden also offers a small gift shop.

== History ==
The garden was founded in 1955, although bamboo keepers were said to have started planting the garden sometime around 1951.

- Bamboo Fly Factory. (2011). Fuji bamboo garden. Retrieved from https://web.archive.org/web/20121214035143/http://www.bambooflyfactory.com/
- Fuji bamboo garden. (n.d.). Retrieved from https://web.archive.org/web/20130318165512/http://www.bambooshop.biz/fujibamboogarden.html
- Fuji Bamboo Garden. (2012). Fuji bamboo garden. Retrieved from http://fujibamboogarden.com/light/top.htm
- Fuji Bamboo Garden (Japanese)
- BGCI entry
- Shizuoka Guide entry
- Reports of the Fuji Bamboo Garden

== See also ==
- List of botanical gardens in Japan
