= Nagaizumi =

Nagaizumi 長泉町
- Town
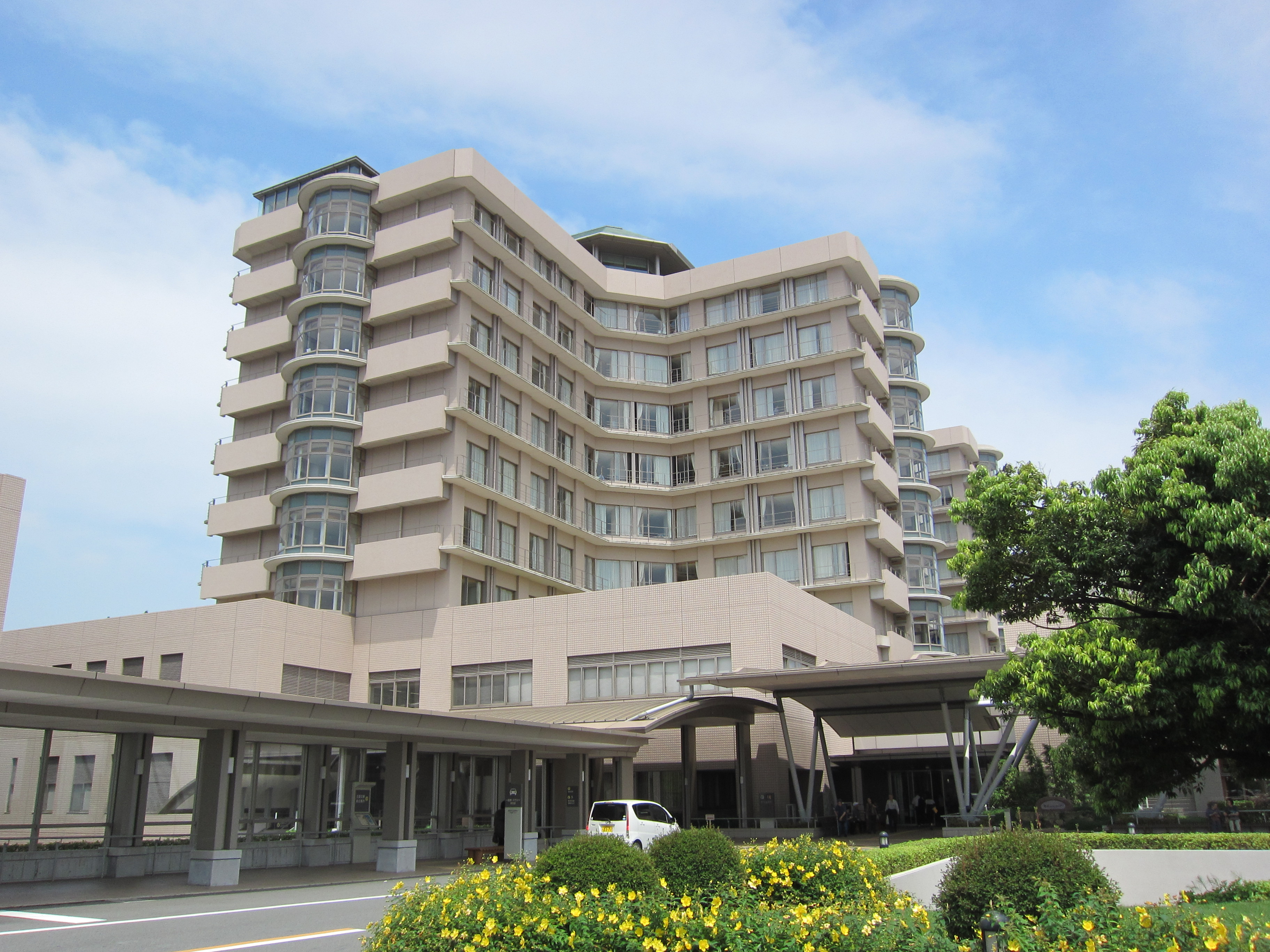
- Shizuoka Cancer Center in Nagaizumi

- Flag Seal
- Location of Nagaizumi in Shizuoka Prefecture

- Coordinates: 35°8′15.6″N 138°53′49.8″E
- Country: Japan
- Region: Chūbu; Tōkai
- Prefecture: Shizuoka
- District: Suntō
- Village settled: April 1, 1889
- Town settled: April 1, 1960

Government
  - Mayor: Osamu Ikeda (from October 2017)

Area
  - Total: 26.63 km^{2} (10.28 sq mi)

Population (August 2019)
  - Total: 43,568
  - Density: 1,636/km^{2} (4,237/sq mi)
- Time zone: UTC+9 (Japan Standard Time)
- Tree: Ternstroemia gymnanthera
- Flower: Satsuki azalea
- Phone number: 055-989-5500
- Address: 828 Nakadokari Nagaizumi-chō, Suntō-gun, Shizuoka-ken 411-8668
- Website: Official website

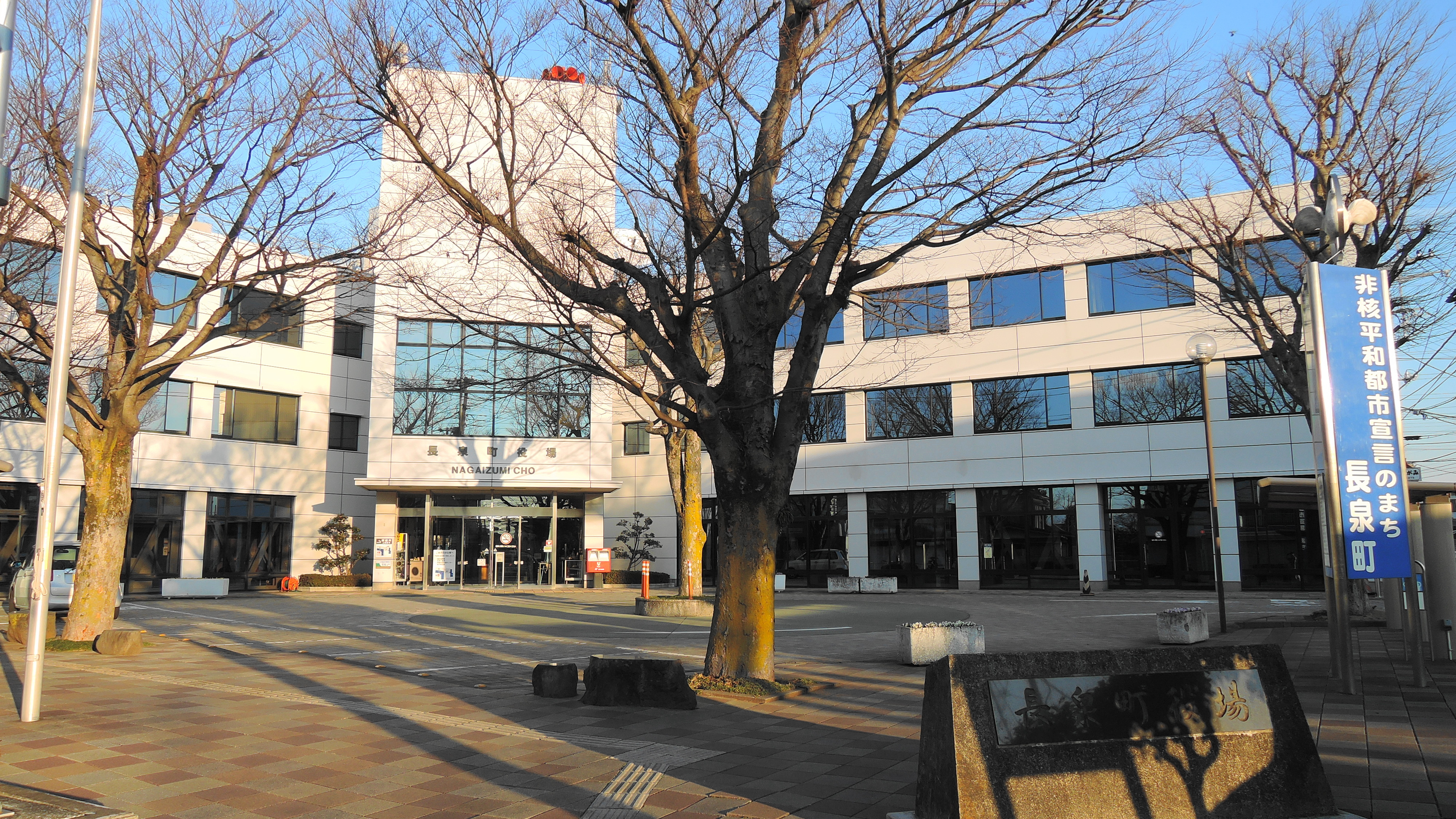
Nagaizumi Town Hall

Nagaizumi (長泉町, Nagaizumi-chō) is a town located in Suntō District, Shizuoka Prefecture, Japan. As of 1 August 2019, the town had an estimated population of 43,568 in 18154 households and a population density of 1,600 persons per km^{2}. The total area of the town was 26.63 square kilometres (10.28 sq mi).

== Geography ==
Nagaizumi is located in east-central Shizuoka Prefecture, south of Mount Fuji, and north of Izu Peninsula. The area has a temperate maritime climate with hot, humid summers and mild, cool winters.

=== Neighboring municipalities ===
- Shizuoka Prefecture
  - Fuji
  - Mishima
  - Numazu
  - Shimizu
  - Susono

== Demographics ==
Per Japanese census data, the population of Nagaizumi has been increasing rapidly over the past 60 years.

Historical population
Year	Pop.	±%
1940	8,280	—
1950	12,084	+45.9%
1960	15,853	+31.2%
1970	27,951	+76.3%
1980	31,423	+12.4%
1990	33,101	+5.3%
2000	36,169	+9.3%
2010	40,767	+12.7%

=== Climate ===
The city has a climate characterized by hot and humid summers, and relatively mild winters (Köppen climate classification Cfa). The average annual temperature in Nagaizumi is 14.1 °C. The average annual rainfall is 1945 mm with September as the wettest month. The temperatures are highest on average in August, at around 25.2 °C, and lowest in January, at around 3.7 °C.

== History ==
Nagaizumi is located in the far eastern portion of former Suruga Province, and was largely tenryō territory under direct control of the Tokugawa shogunate in the Edo period. With the establishment of the modern municipalities system in the early Meiji period on April 1, 1888, the area was reorganized into the village of Nagaizumi through the merger of 10 small hamlets. Nagaizumi achieved town status on April 1, 1960.

== Economy ==
Nagaizumi is host to numerous industries, including paper mills, and chemical plants. Large factories are operated by Toray Industries, Kyowa Hakko Kirin Co., Ltd., Toho Tenax, Tokushu Paper Mfg. Co., Ltd., and Olympus Corporation. Nagaizumi also serves as a bedroom community for the industrial zones in neighboring Mishima and Numazu. Agricultural products of Nagaizumi include persimmons, mountain yam, white welsh onions and melon.

== Education ==
Nagaizumi has three public elementary schools and two public middle schools operated by the town government . The town does not have a public high school, but has one private high school.

== Transportation ==
Although the Tōmei Expressway and the Tōkaidō Shinkansen both pass through Nagaizumi, the town is not served by either an interchange or Shinkansen passenger railway station. The city is served by non-toll roads and standard passenger train service.

=== Railroad ===
- Central Japan Railway Company - Gotemba Line
  - Nagaizumi-Nameri - Shimo-Togari

=== Highway ===
- AH1 Tomei Expressway
- Shin-Tōmei Expressway - Nagaizumi-Numazu IC
- Izu-Jūkan Expressway
- National Route 246

== Sister cities ==
- Whanganui, New Zealand, since September 1988
- Aoki, Nagano, Japan, since November 2007

== Local attractions ==
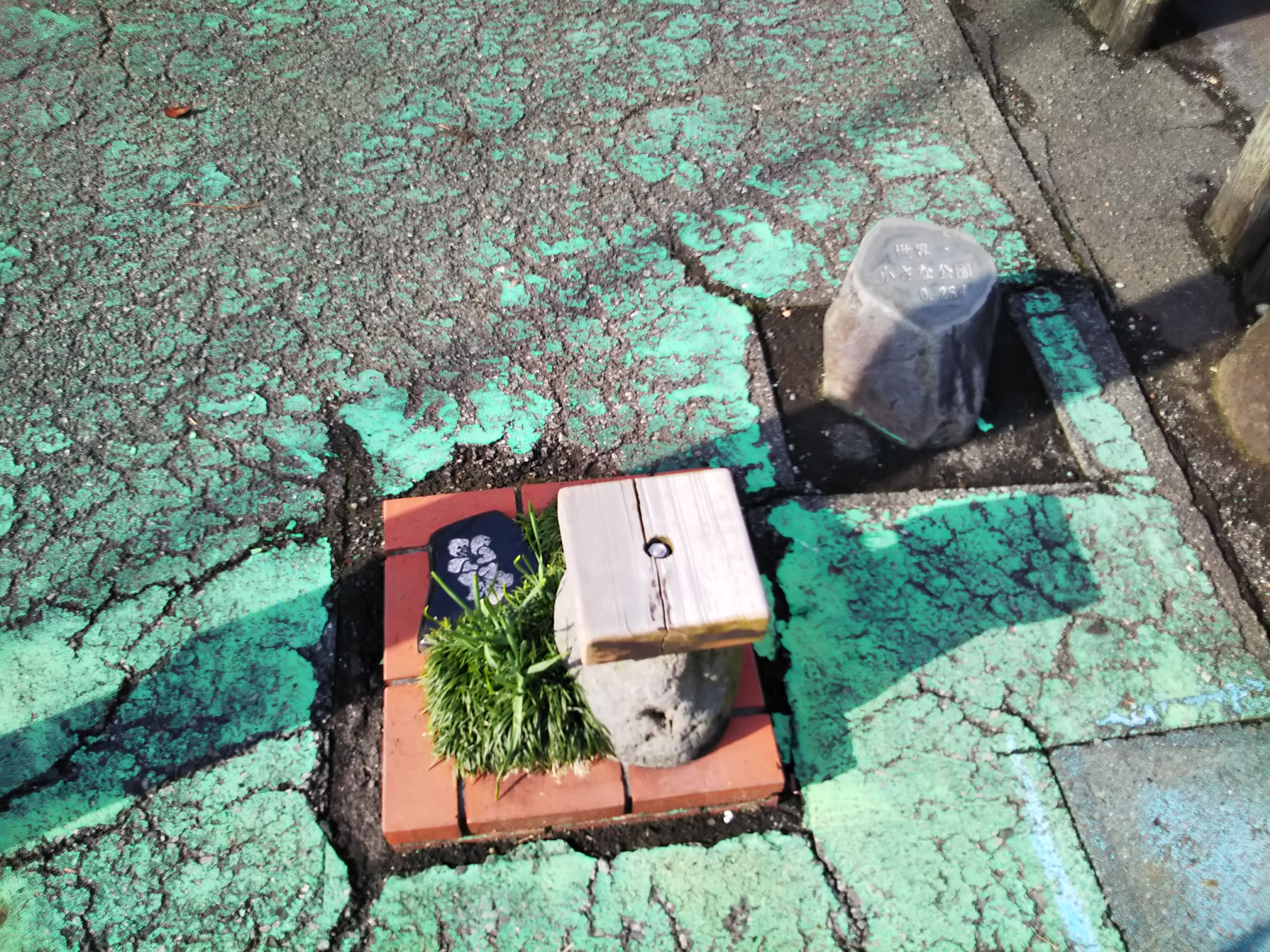
The world’s smallest park.

- Fuji Bamboo Garden
- The world's smallest park

== Notable people from Nagaizumi ==
- Shingo Ono, professional baseball player
- Taketo Shiokawa, professional soccer player
