= Mill Ends Park =

Small urban park in Portland, Oregon, U.S.

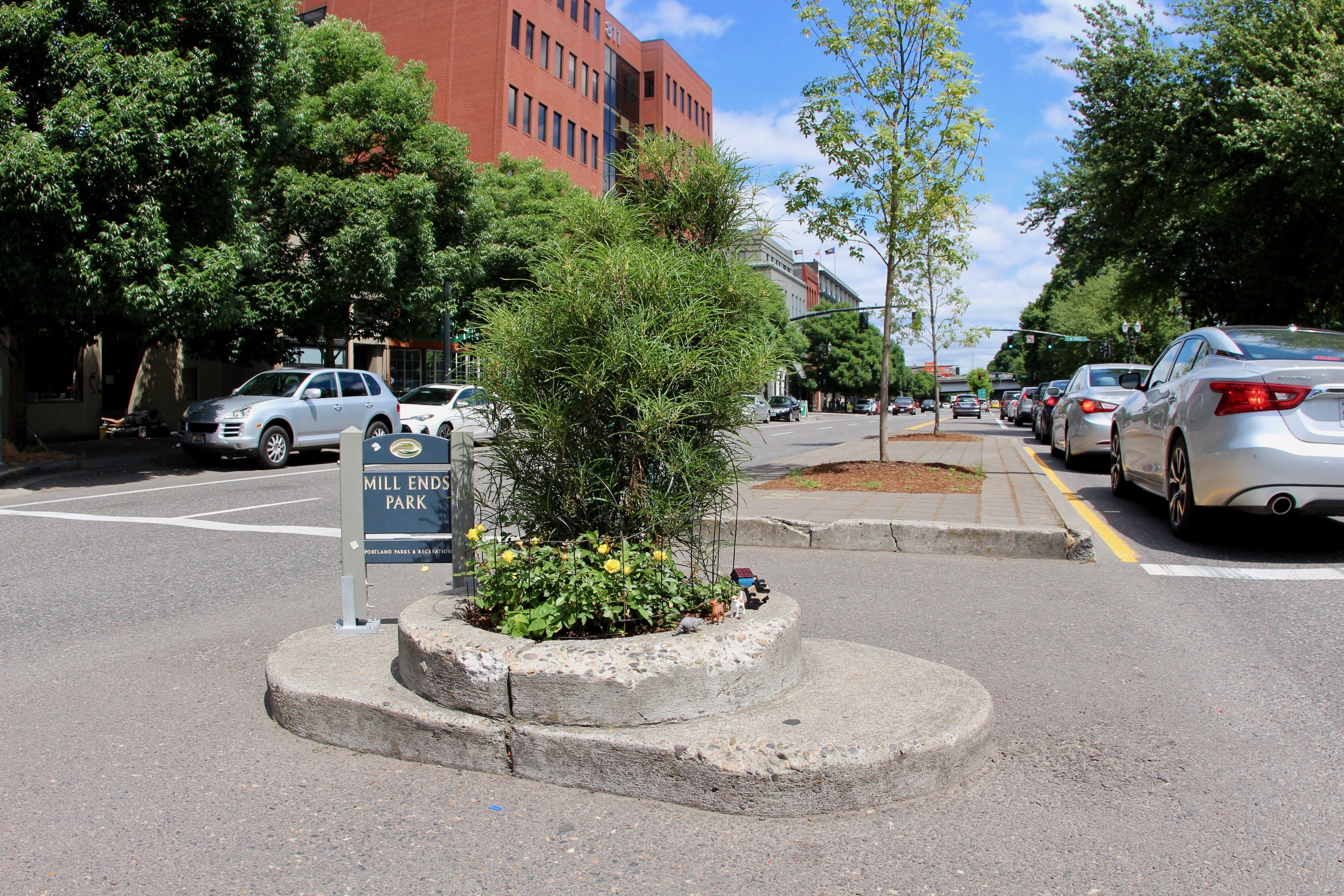
- The park in 2018
- Interactive map of Mill Ends Park
- Type: Urban park
- Location: SW Naito Pkwy. and Taylor St. Portland, Oregon
- Coordinates: 45°30′58″N 122°40′24″W
- Area: 452 sq in (0.292 m^{2})
- Created: 1948
- Operator: Portland Parks & Recreation
- Public transit: Yamhill District and Morrison/SW 3rd Ave

Mill Ends Park (sometimes mistakenly called Mill's End Park) is the smallest urban park in the United States. It consists of 1 tree, located in the median strip of SW Naito Parkway next to Tom McCall Waterfront Park along the Willamette River near SW Taylor Street in the downtown core of Portland, Oregon, United States. The park is a small circle 2 ft (0.61 m) across, with a total area of 452 sq in (0.292 m^{2}). It was the smallest park in the world, according to the Guinness Book of Records, which first granted it this recognition in 1971, and held the distinction until February 2025, when the honour was awarded to a park in the town of Nagaizumi, Japan, dubbed "The world's smallest park", which is 0.24 m^{2} (370 sq in).

== History ==
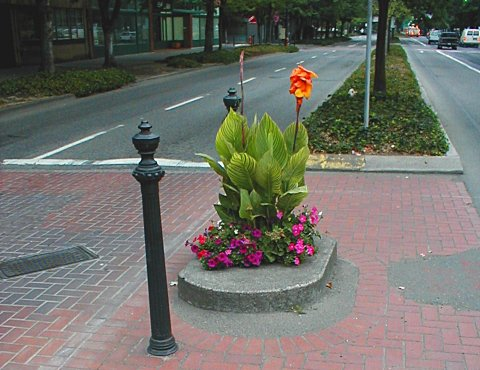
The park in summer 2004 (before remodeling)

In 1948 the site that would become Mill Ends Park was intended to be the site for a light pole. When the pole failed to appear and weeds sprouted in the opening, Dick Fagan, a columnist for The Oregon Journal, planted flowers in the hole and named it after his column in the paper, "Mill Ends" (a reference to leftover irregular pieces of wood at lumber mills). Fagan's office in the Journal Building overlooked the median in the middle of the busy thoroughfare that ran in front of the building (then known as SW Front Avenue).

In 1976, the park was dedicated as "the only leprechaun colony west of Ireland" as part of Portland's Saint Patrick's Day celebrations, according to Fagan.

=== Legend ===
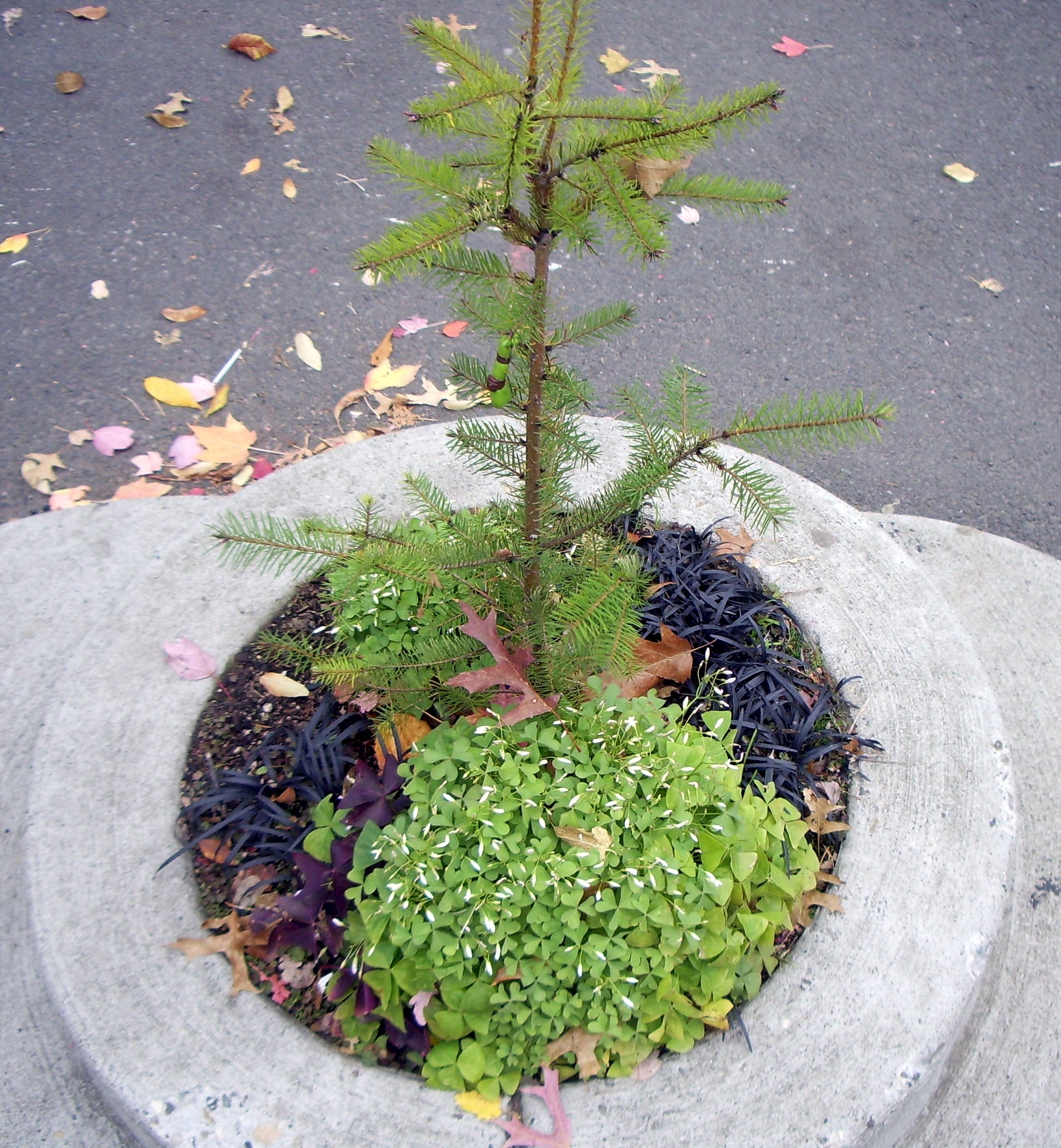
The park in November 2011

Fagan told this story of the park's origin: He looked out the window and spotted a leprechaun digging in the hole. He ran down and grabbed the leprechaun, which meant that he had earned a wish. Fagan said he wished for a park of his own, but since he had not specified the size of the park in his wish, the leprechaun gave him the hole. Over the next two decades, Fagan often featured the park and its head leprechaun in his whimsical column. Fagan claimed to be the only person who could see the head leprechaun, Patrick O'Toole.

Fagan published a threat by O'Toole about the 11 o'clock curfew set on all city parks. O'Toole dared the mayor to try to evict him and his followers from Mill Ends and threatened a leprechaun curse on him should he attempt to do so. Subsequently, no legal action was taken, and the leprechauns were allowed to stay in the park after hours.

According to legend, the leprechauns at Mill Ends Park are only visible to humans at midnight during a full moon on St. Patrick's Day -- and even then, only to children bearing four-leaf clovers as gifts. The next St. Patrick's Day full moon is March 17, 2041.

=== Evolution ===
Fagan died of cancer in 1969, but the park lives on, cared for by others. It was named an official city park in 1976.

The small circle has featured many unusual items through the decades, including a swimming pool for butterflies—complete with diving board—a horseshoe, a fragment of the Journal building, and a miniature Ferris wheel, which was delivered by a full-size crane. On St. Patrick's Day, 2001, the park was visited by a tiny leprechaun leaning against his pot of gold and children's drawings of four-leaf clovers and leprechauns. The park continues to be the site of St. Patrick's Day festivities. The events held here include concerts by Clan Macleay Pipe Band, picnics, and rose plantings by the Junior Rose Festival Court.

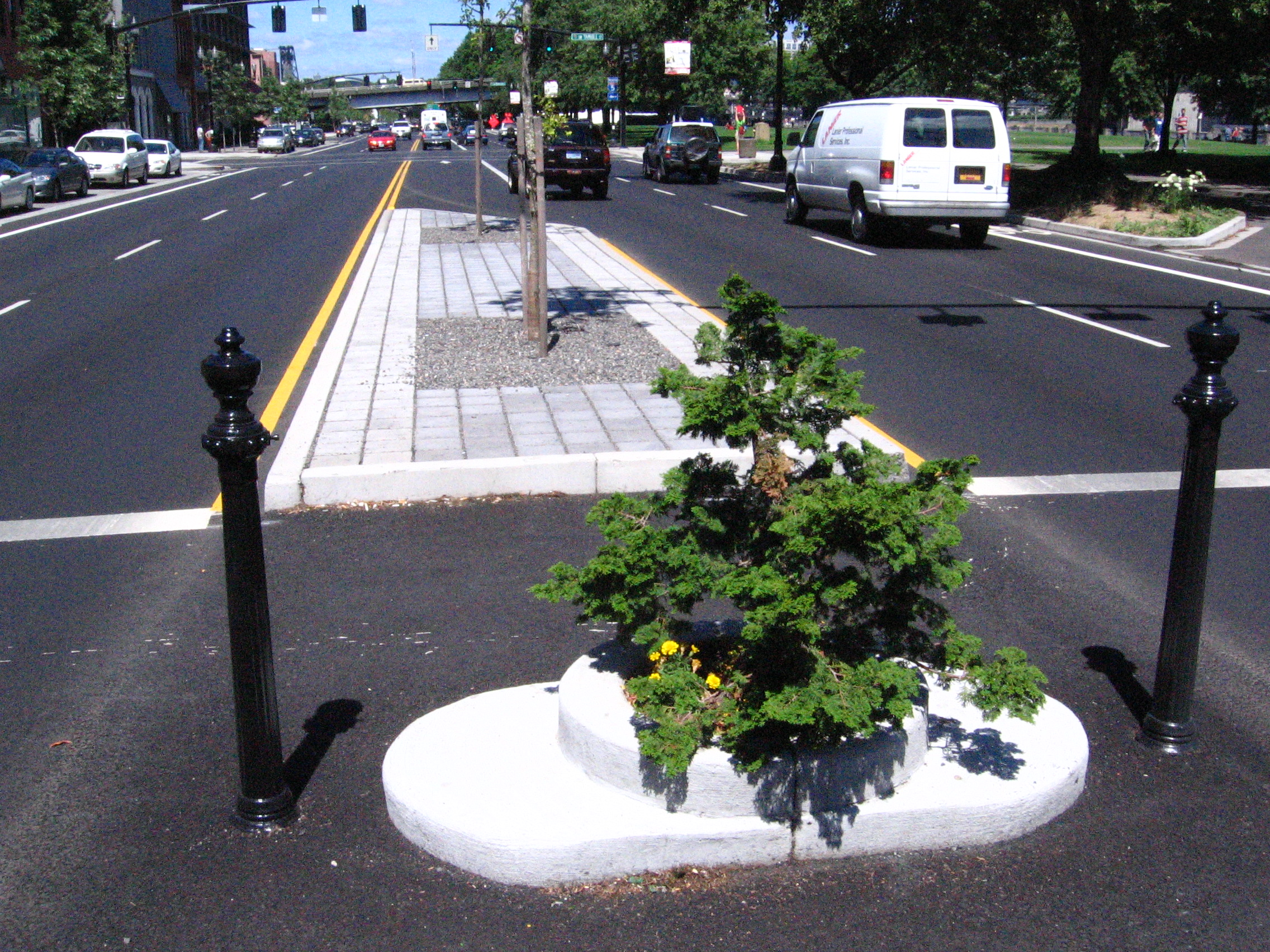
The park in 2007

In February 2006, the park was temporarily relocated during road construction to a planter outside the World Trade Center Portland, about 80 feet (24 m) from its permanent location. It was returned to its home—now named SW Naito Parkway—on March 16, 2007, in true St. Patrick's Day style with the Royal Rosarians, bagpipers, and the Fagan family, including Dick's widow, Katherine, in attendance. The legend lives on in the Fagan family. One of Fagan's sons, Pat Fagan, lives in Gladstone and has enjoyed sharing the park with his own son. "He loves it," Pat Fagan said. "It's still the largest leprechaun colony west of Ireland."

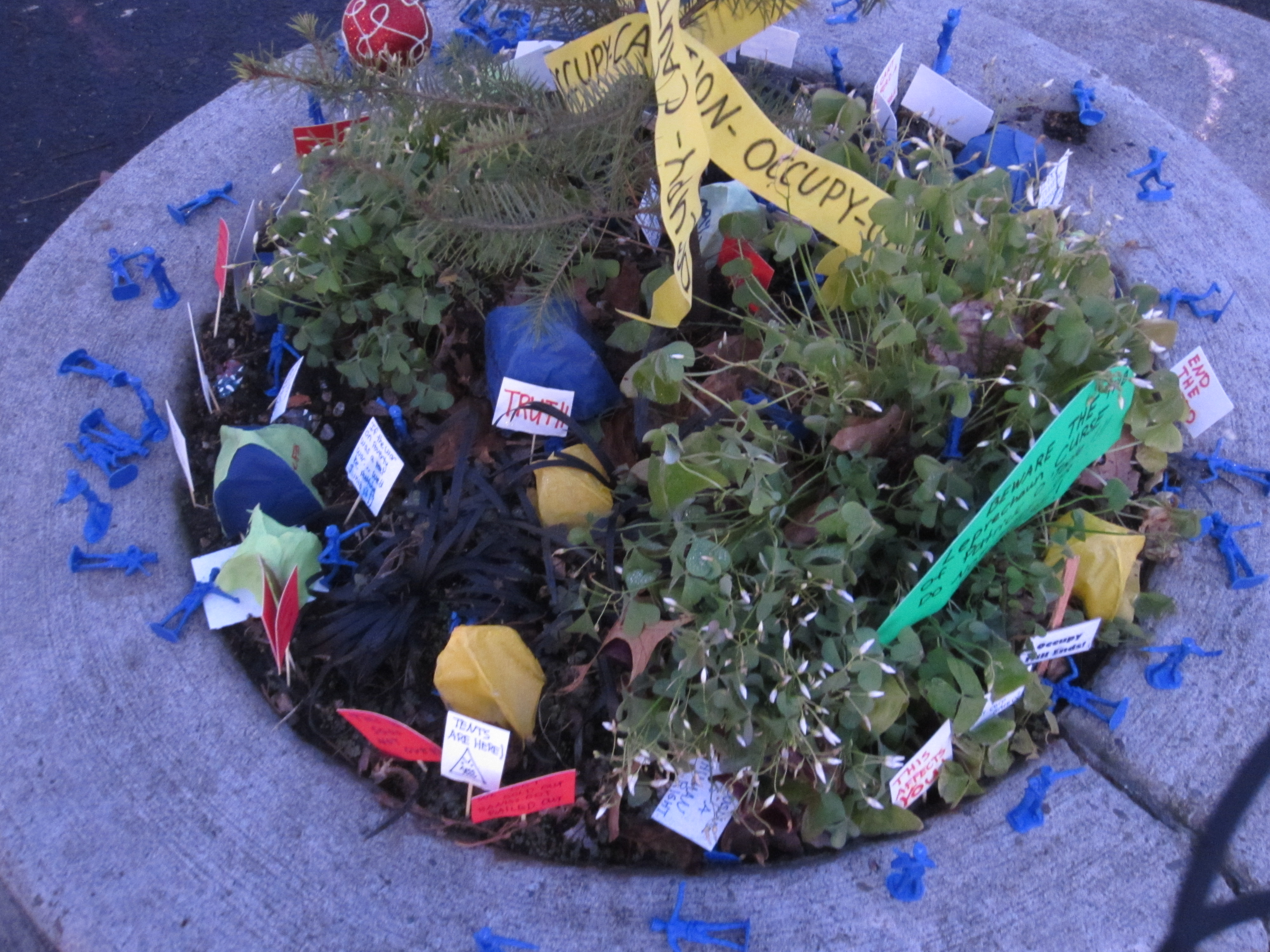
The park during Occupy Portland, December 2011

In December 2011, plastic army men figures and small signs were placed in Mill Ends as a tongue-in-cheek flash mob demonstration for Occupy Portland. One man, Cameron Scott Whitten, was arrested after he was asked by police to move from the sidewalk and refused.

In March 2013, the park's tree was stolen. Officials planted a replacement tree, and one day later, a passerby found what appeared to be the stolen tree lying next to the new one.

The next month, officials from Burntwood, England, complained to Guinness, claiming that Mill Ends was not large enough to be a park and that Prince's Park, smallest in the UK, should hold the world record since it "has a fence around it" among other features. In response, volunteers erected a fence (several inches tall) around and stationed an "armed guard" in the park.

In 2018, Portland Parks & Recreation installed a miniaturized park sign and planted miniature roses.

In December 2019, the tree was cut down by an unknown vandal. However, the tree was soon replaced.

As of July 2021, the park was "temporarily under construction as part of PBOT's Better Naito Forever."

Construction was completed in January 2022, including a new sign. The park had moved six inches from its previous location during improvements along the Naito Parkway.

The park's sole tree went absent during the January 13–16, 2024 North American winter storm, a time when storms felled many trees in Portland. KGW noted that the $29 replacement cost of the tree was up from the $3-5 tree replacement estimate in 2019.

== See also ==
Small parks

- Sekai Ichi Chīsana Park, the current Guinness World Records holder for worlds's smallest park, located in Shizuoka, Japan
- Waldo Park, another small park consisting of a tree, located in nearby Salem, Oregon

Similar notable superlatives

- Hess Triangle, New York, the world's smallest non-public parcel
- Forest Park, also in Portland, among the largest urban forests in the country at over 5,000 acres (2,000 ha)
