= Suntō District, Shizuoka =

District in Shizuoka Prefecture, Japan

Coordinates: 35.368°N 138.927°E

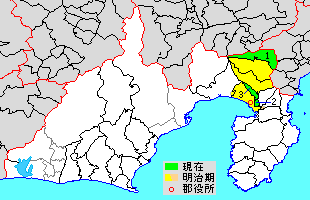
Map of Suntō District in Shizuoka Prefecture

Suntō District (駿東郡, Suntō-gun) is a rural district located in Shizuoka Prefecture, Japan. As of July 2012, the district has an estimated population of 94,229 and a population density of 550 persons per km^{2}. The total area was 171.4856 km^{2}.

== Towns and villages ==
Suntō District currently is composed of three towns. The cities of Susono and Gotemba and parts of the cities of Numazu and Fuji were formerly part of the district.

- Oyama
- Shimizu
- Nagaizumi

== History ==
Suntō District was established in the July 22, 1878 cadastral reforms initiated by the Meiji government with five towns, one post station and 155 villages.

- In a round of consolidation on April 1, 1889, this was reduced to three towns (Numazu, Hara and Gotemba) and 24 villages.
- Oyama Village was established as Oyama Town on August 1, 1912.
- Numazu Town was elevated to city status on July 1, 1923.
- Susono Town was established on April 1, 1952.
- In an around of consolidation from 1955 to 1957, Gotemba was elevated to city status on February 11, 1955. The remaining number of villages reduced to two.
- Nagaizumi Village was promoted to town status on April 1, 1960.
- Shimizu Village was promoted to town status on November 3, 1963, leaving the district with five towns and no villages.
- Hara Town was annexed by Numazu on April 1, 1968.
- Susono Town was elevated to city status on January 1, 1971.
