= The world's smallest park =

Park in Nagaizumi, Japan

- Sekai-ichi Chiisana Kōen (世界一小さな公園)
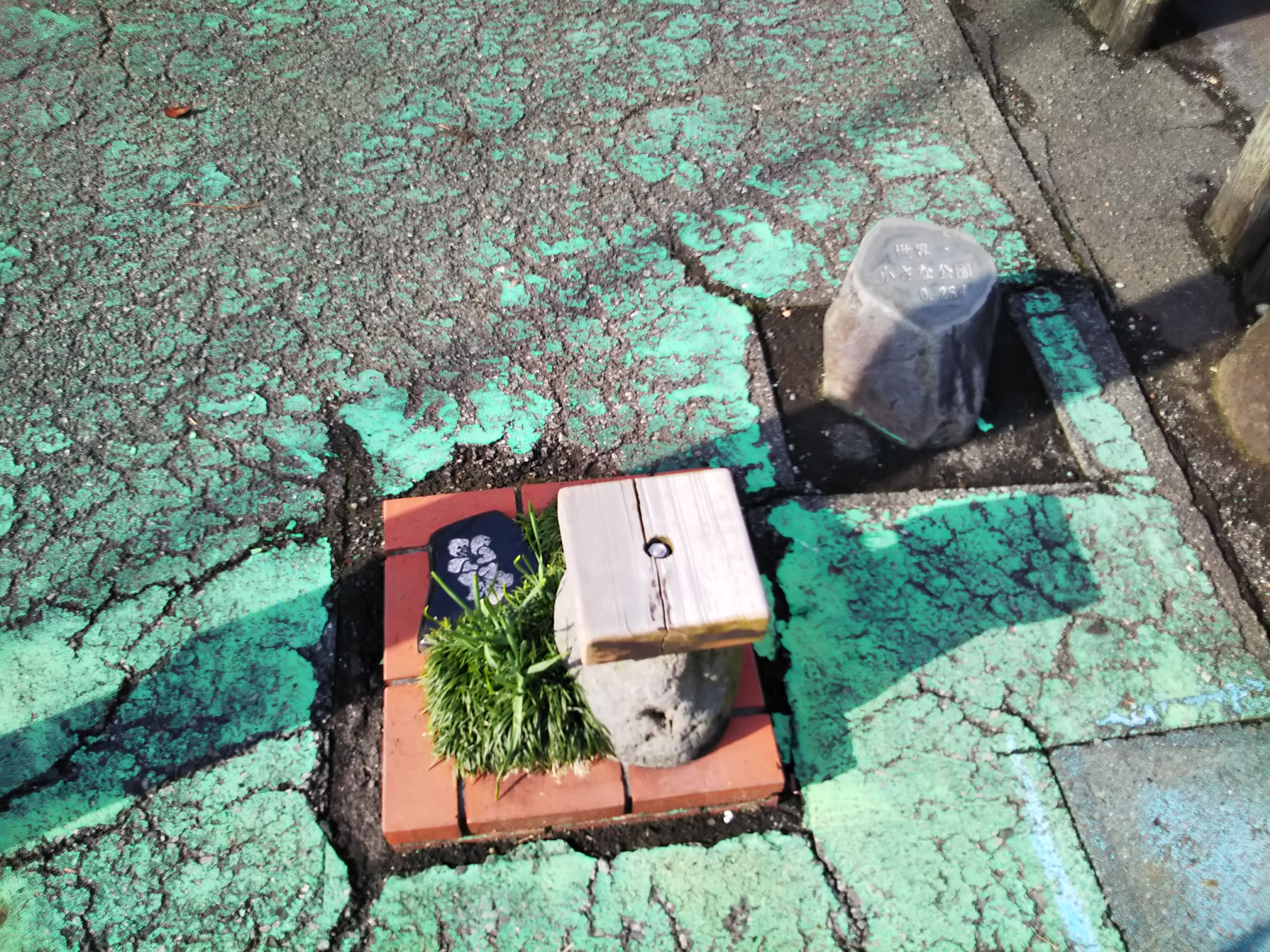
- "The world's smallest park" surrounded with bricks, and a small monument located nearby
- Interactive map of The world's smallest park
- Location: Nagaizumi, Shizuoka, Japan
- Coordinates: 35°8′5.7″N 138°53′55″E
- Area: 0.24 m^{2} (370 sq in)
- Created: 1988
- Operator: Nagaizumi town

The world's smallest park (Japanese: 世界一小さな公園, Hepburn: Sekai-ichi Chiisana Kōen) is a park located in Nagaizumi, Shizuoka, Japan.

== Overview ==
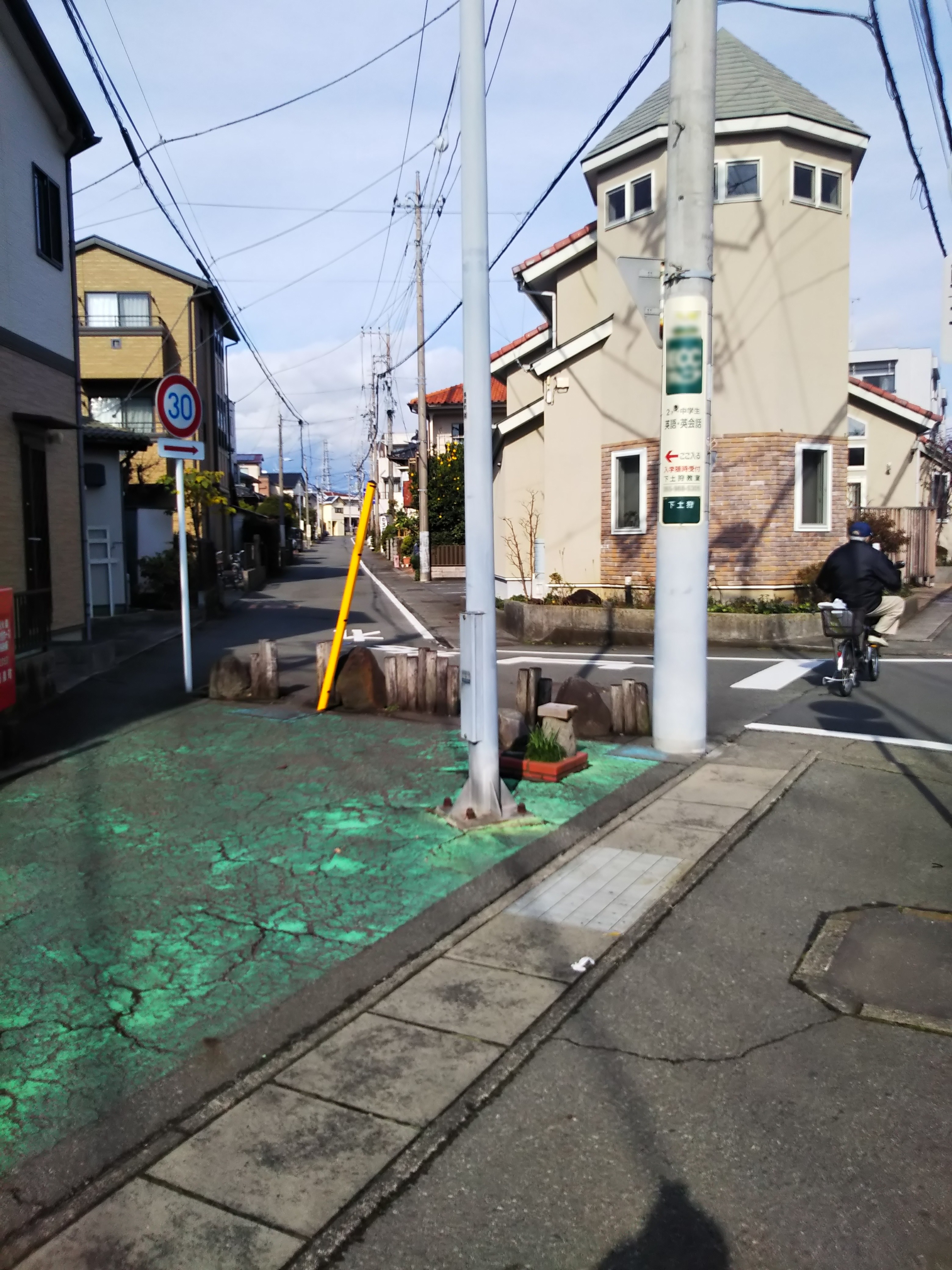
The park is located at a tiny area between Nagaizumi Central Street (長泉中央通り) and an alley

In 1988, the park was opened to utilize an extra space which was created during road construction. There is a wooden bench, a black stone plate with a carving of flowers, and some vegetation in a 0.24 m^{2} (2.6 sq ft) square area surrounded by bricks. The park is smaller than Mill Ends Park in Portland, Oregon, which was formerly recorded as the world's smallest park on Guinness World Records.

While Nagaizumi town used to state they have no intent to apply to Guinness World Records since the "park" is technically not a park but a part of a road, in 2024, they officially changed its designation to a park and started a project to apply for the world record. The fee for applying was around 2.5 million yen (equivalent to US$16,500) and the funds were raised by using the Hometown tax system. After a survey in January 2025, the land area was 0.24 m^{2} (370 sq in). Following this, the town formally announced the place as a park. The park was certified as a Guinness World Record, and an awarding ceremony was held on February 25 at Nagaizumi town hall.
