= 1959 Pan American Games =

3rd edition of the Pan American Games

III Pan American Games
- Poster of the 1959 Pan American Games
- Host: Chicago, United States
- Nations: 25
- Athletes: 2,263
- Events: 166 in 18 sports
- Opening: August 27
- Closing: September 7
- Opened by: Milton S. Eisenhower
- Main venue: Soldier Field

The 1959 Pan American Games, officially known as the III Pan American Games and commonly known as Chicago 1959, were held in Chicago, Illinois, United States between August 28 and September 7, 1959.

== Host city selection ==
One city initially submitted a bid to host the 1959 Pan American Games that was recognized by the Pan American Sports Organization (PASO), along with three cities that had submitted bids, then later withdrew their bids. On March 11, 1955, at the IV Pan American Congress in Mexico City, PASO selected Cleveland, Ohio unanimously to host the III Pan American Games.

On April 15, 1957, Cleveland asked PASO to be relieved of its assignment as the host city as the city believed it was not properly prepared to host the Games. Subsequently, both Guatemala City and Rio de Janeiro informed PASO that they would not be able to host the Games either. Two cities came forward as candidates to host the games, Chicago and São Paulo. On August 3, 1957, Chicago was selected to host the Games over São Paulo by a vote of 13 to 6.

== Organization ==
Once Chicago took over as host city following Cleveland's withdrawal, there were 18 months left to organize the games. The games were held on-schedule nonetheless. The games were the first Pan American Games to be held during the Northern Hemisphere's summer. The previous two editions were held in March.

In the months following the awarding of the Games to Chicago, PASO leadership became seriously concerned that Chicago's preparations for the event were insufficient. Particularly, they felt that the event's director, Colonel Jack Reilly, was treating the Games as an ordinary Chicago event rather than an international competition on par with the Olympics. In the summer of 1958, then-current IOC president and PASO honorary president Avery Brundage, himself an American, privately said that the Chicago organizers "haven't the faintest idea of the magnitude of the task they have assumed" and predicted that the Games would be "the most dismal fiasco in the history of international sport". Publicly, he warned that "unless greater effort is put forth to prepare for the 1959 Pan American Games, both the city and the nation may be disgraced in the eyes of the world". PASO considered cancelling the Games entirely before Chicago's organizing committee was reorganized and Reilly was replaced.

== The Games ==
Alternative poster in Spanish

The Games opened on August 27, 1959, in sunny 90 °F (32 °C) heat before 40,000 people at Soldier Field. The opening ceremony was preceded by a monthlong torch relay from Mexico City to Chicago. The torch itself was symbolic: instead of a burning flame, the "Atomic Torch" consisted of a blue lightbulb surrounded by a chromium-plated model of an atom. The torch was designed by staff at Argonne National Laboratory near Chicago. President Dwight D. Eisenhower was expected to attend the opening ceremony, but he canceled his appearance in favor of a diplomatic trip to Europe. Eisenhower's brother Milton attended the ceremony in his place.

The event was marred by numerous organizational failures and poor-quality facilities. For some sports, such as shooting, no practice facilities were provided at all. Manuel Gonzalez Guerra, who would become president of the Cuban Olympic Committee during the Castro era, referred to the 1959 Games as "the worst ever," and his comments were in line with the negative perceptions of many other Latin Americans who traveled to Chicago for the Games.

Male athletes were housed in dormitories, with most staying on the campus of the University of Chicago, while others stayed in dorms at the Ferry Hall School and North Central College. Female athletes were housed in rooms at the Shoreland Hotel. On September 7, hours before the closing ceremony, Brazilian rower Ronaldo Duncan Arantes was found dead with bullet wounds at North Central College. Arantes' brother Rômulo, a fellow athlete at the Games, reported that Ronaldo had brought money to Chicago with him to purchase firearms. No one was ever charged in Arantes' death.

== Medal table ==
* Host nation (United States)

Rank	NATION	Gold	Silver	Bronze	Total
1	United States*	121	75	56	252
2	Argentina	9	22	12	43
3	Brazil	8	8	6	22
4	Canada	6	20	27	53
5	Mexico	6	10	15	31
6	Chile	5	2	6	13
7	British West Indies	2	4	7	13
8	Cuba	2	4	5	11
9	Bahamas	2	0	0	2
10	Venezuela	1	7	7	15
11	Uruguay	1	3	4	8
12	Panama	0	4	4	8
13	Peru	0	2	5	7
14	Puerto Rico	0	2	4	6
15	Ecuador	0	1	1	2
16	Haiti	0	1	0	1
17	British Guiana	0	0	3	3
18	Guatemala	0	0	1	1
18	Netherlands Antilles	0	0	1	1
Totals (19 entries)		163	165	164	492

== Sports and venues ==
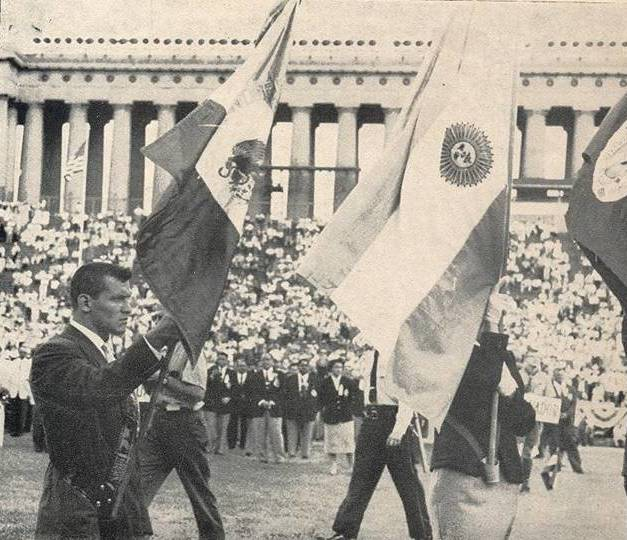
Opening ceremonies at Soldier Field. Wrestler Mario Tovar González can be seen serving as Mexico's flag bearer.

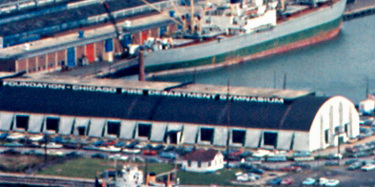
Gymnasium at Navy Pier, venue of the gymnastics competition

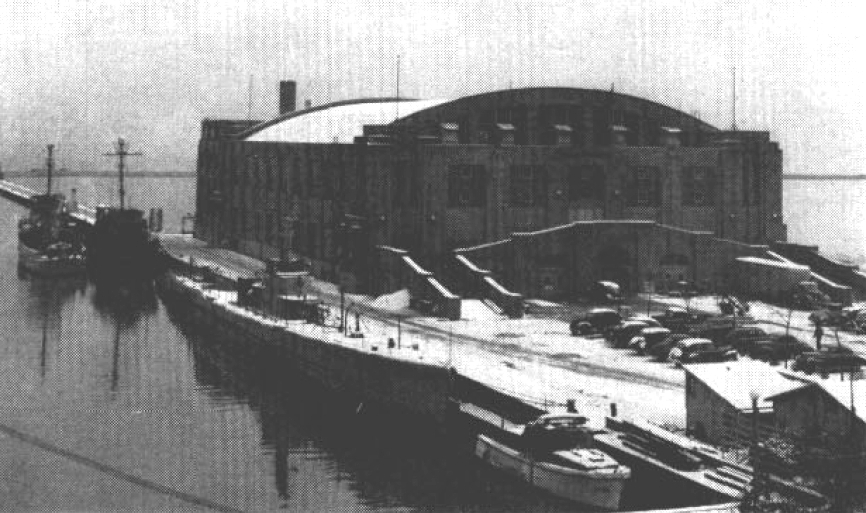
U.S. Naval Armory, venue of the boxing competition

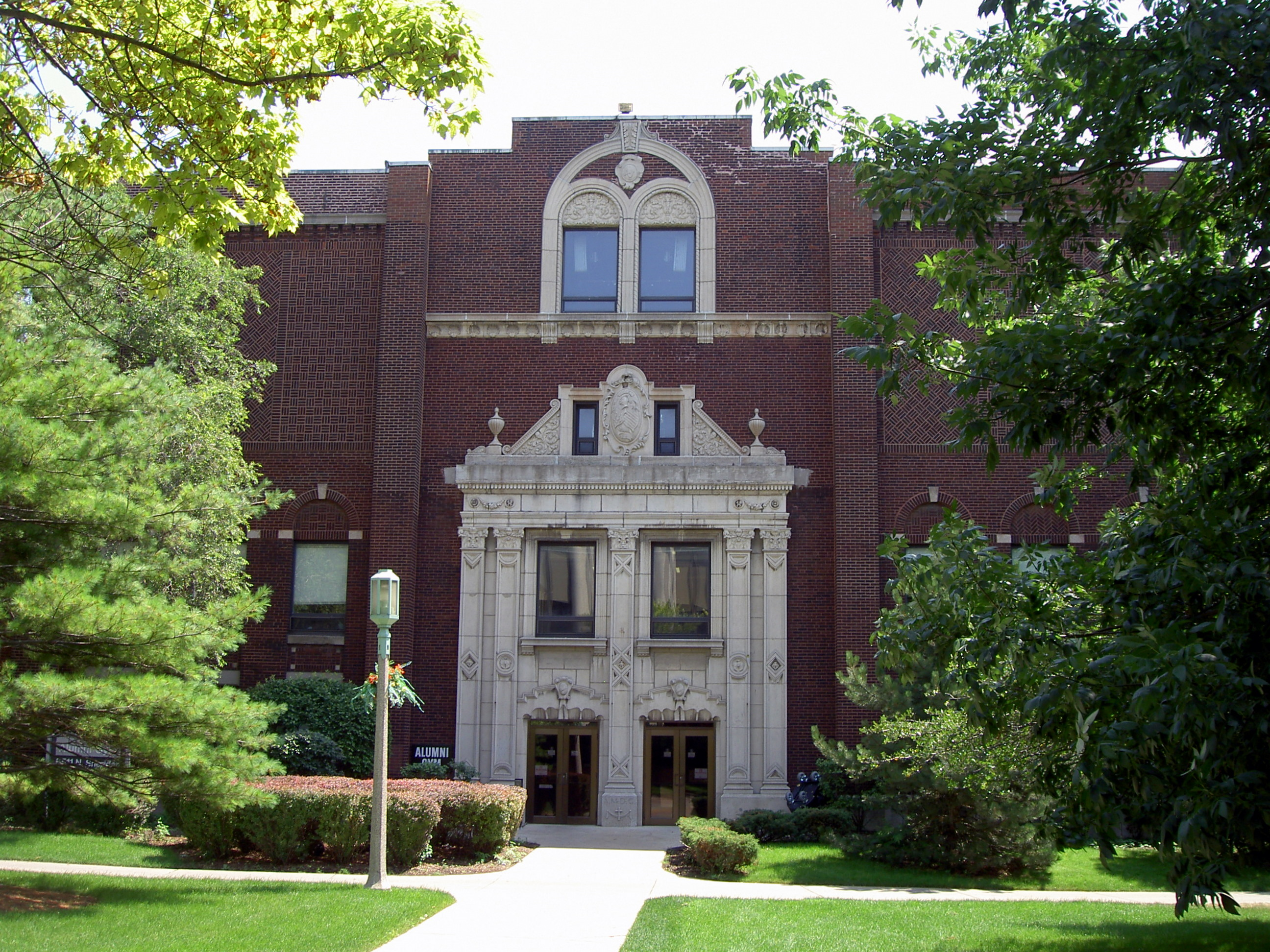
Alumni Gym, venue for men's basketball (photographed in 2009)

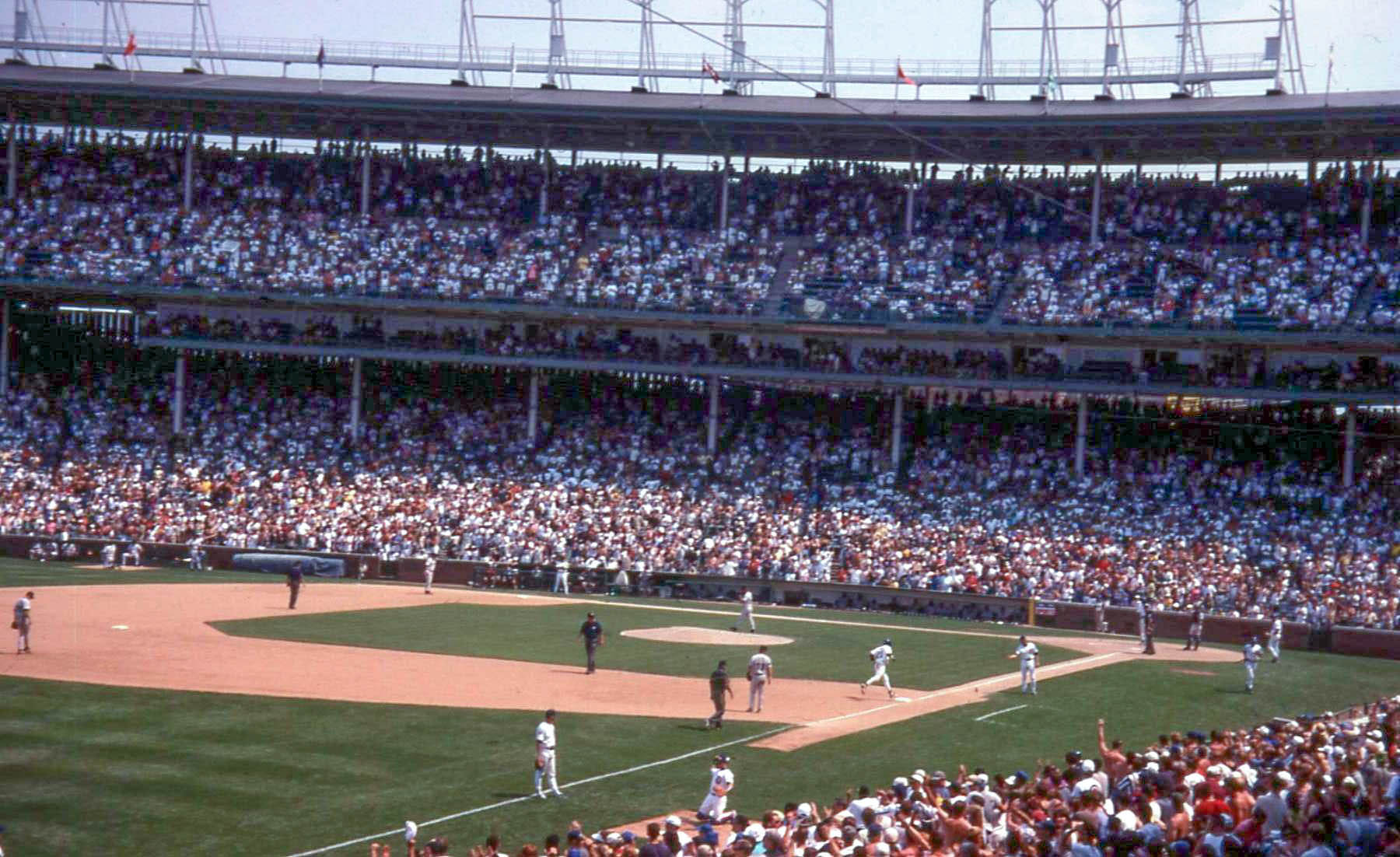
Wrigley Field, a venue for baseball (photographed in 1997)

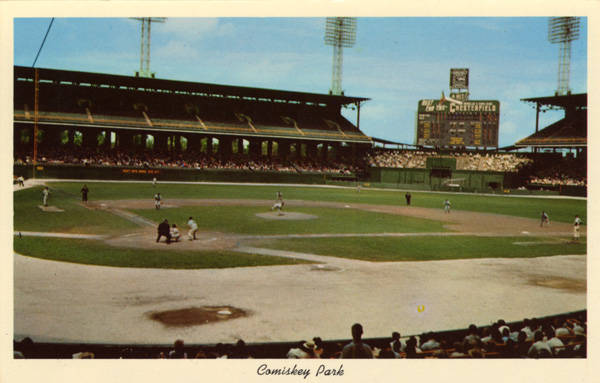
Comiskey Park, a venue for baseball

- Athletics () at Soldier Field
- Baseball () at Wrigley Field and Comiskey Park
- Basketball () at Alumni Gym (men's) and Oak Park High School (women's)
- Boxing () at Northwest Armory
- Cycling () at Gately Stadium temporary venue (track cycling) and Lincoln Park (road cycling)
- Diving () at Portage Park
- Equestrian () (Open jumping) at Oak Brook Polo Club and Soldier Field
- Fencing () U.S. Naval Armory
- Football () (soccer) at Hanson Stadium and Soldier Field
- Gymnastics () at University of Illinois Chicago campus at Navy Pier
- Modern pentathlon () at Waukegan Shooting Range (shooting), Great Lakes Naval Training Center (fencing), Independence Grove (equestrian show-jumping and cross-country running), and Portage Park (swimming)
- Rowing () in the Cal-Sag Channel near Lemont
- Sailing () in Lake Michigan
- Shooting () at Waukegan Gun Range and Lincoln Park Gun Club (skeet)
- Swimming () at Portage Park
- Tennis () at Lincoln Park Tennis Club
- Volleyball () at Proviso High School
- Water polo () at Portage Park
- Weightlifting () at Chicago Vocational High School
- Wrestling () at Reavis High School

Preceded by Mexico City	III Pan American Games; Chicago (1959)	Succeeded by São Paulo
