= Parks in Chicago =

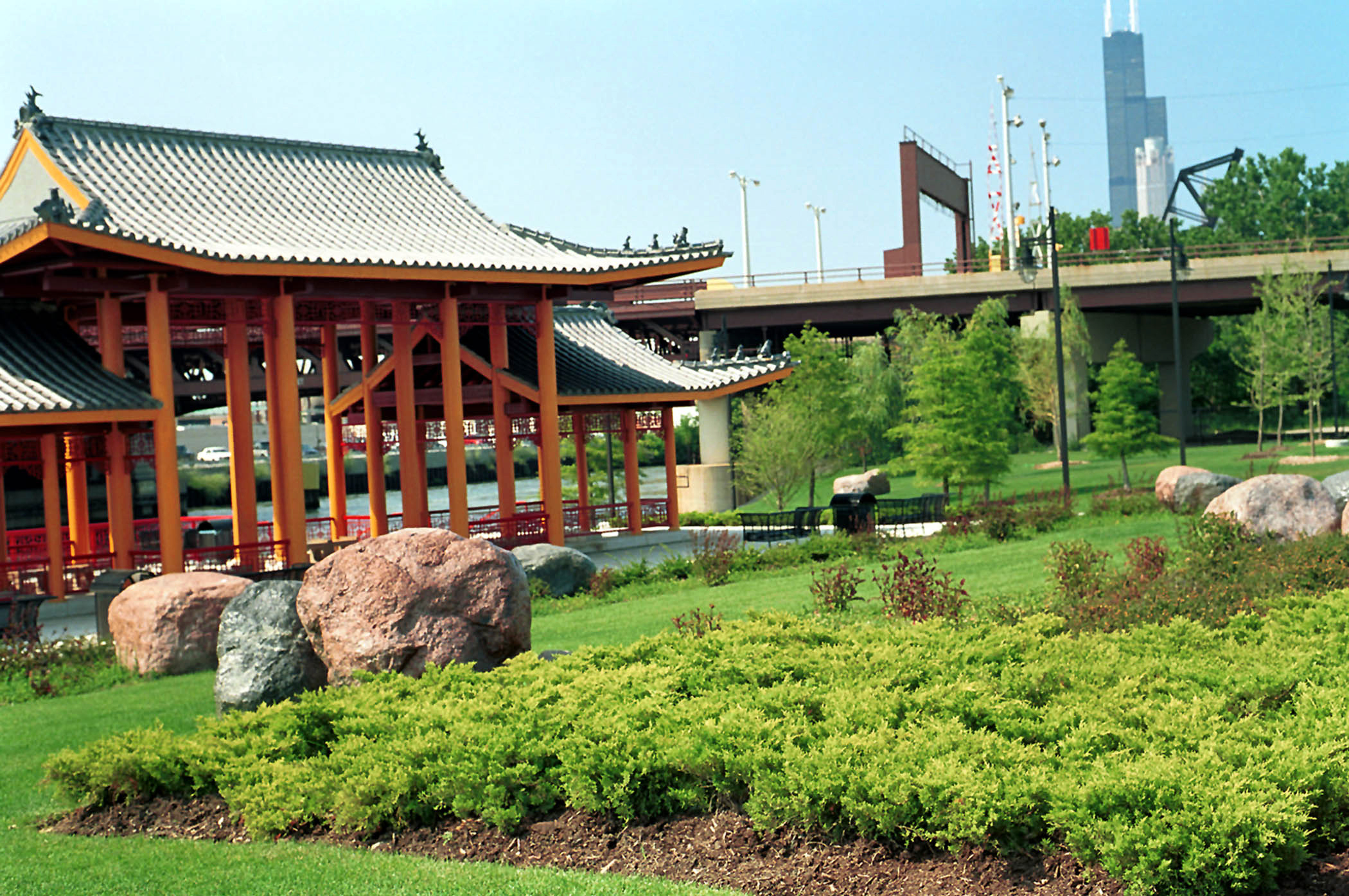
The riverfront pavilion in Ping Tom Memorial Park

Parks in Chicago include open spaces and facilities, developed and managed by the Chicago Park District. The City of Chicago devotes 8.5% of its total land acreage to parkland, which ranked it 13th among high-density population cities in the United States in 2012. Since the 1830s, the official motto of Chicago has been Urbs in horto, Latin for "City in a garden" for its commitment to parkland. In addition to serving residents, a number of these parks also double as tourist destinations, most notably Lincoln Park, Chicago's largest park, visited by over 20 million people each year, is one of the most visited parks in the United States. Notable architects, artists and landscape architects have contributed to the 570 parks, including Daniel Burnham, Frederick Law Olmsted, Jens Jensen, Dwight Perkins, Frank Gehry, and Lorado Taft.

== History ==
In 1836, a year before Chicago was incorporated, the Board of Canal Commissioners held public auctions for the city's first lots. Foresighted citizens, who wanted the Lake Michigan lakefront kept as public open space, convinced the commissioners to designate two lots as public area. The land east of Michigan Avenue between Madison Street and Park Row (11th Street) was designated "Public Ground—A Common to Remain Forever Open, Clear and Free of Any Buildings, or Other Obstruction, whatever." This lot was soon expanded to Randolph Street, and it was officially named Lake Park in 1847. It was renamed Grant Park in 1901. A second parcel, west of Michigan Avenue between Randolph and Washington Streets, was designated Dearborn Park.

As Chicago grew, demand increased for public spaces, but the Chicago Common Council did little to address these requests. Instead, real estate investors realized that small public squares could increase the value of their property. In 1842, Washington Square Park became the first of these ventures, developed by the American Land Company. Similar projects were completed with Goudy Square Park in 1847 and Union Park in 1853. Although the Cook County Court agreed to allocate a major park on the South Side in 1857, these plans were rescinded two years later, and public outcry continued.

Chicago's second large-scale allocation of parkland came in 1860, when a large section of the City Cemetery was re-designated as a park. This was due to concerns led by John Henry Rauch about the possible public health impact of having a large cemetery on the lake. This new park was also named Lake Park; however, due to confusion over its name, it was renamed to Lincoln Park in 1865, in honor of the recently deceased President. Slowly, all of the graves were moved from the cemetery, greatly expanding the park. (Note: One grave, the Couch Tomb, was never removed from the site and serves as a reminder of the park's past.)

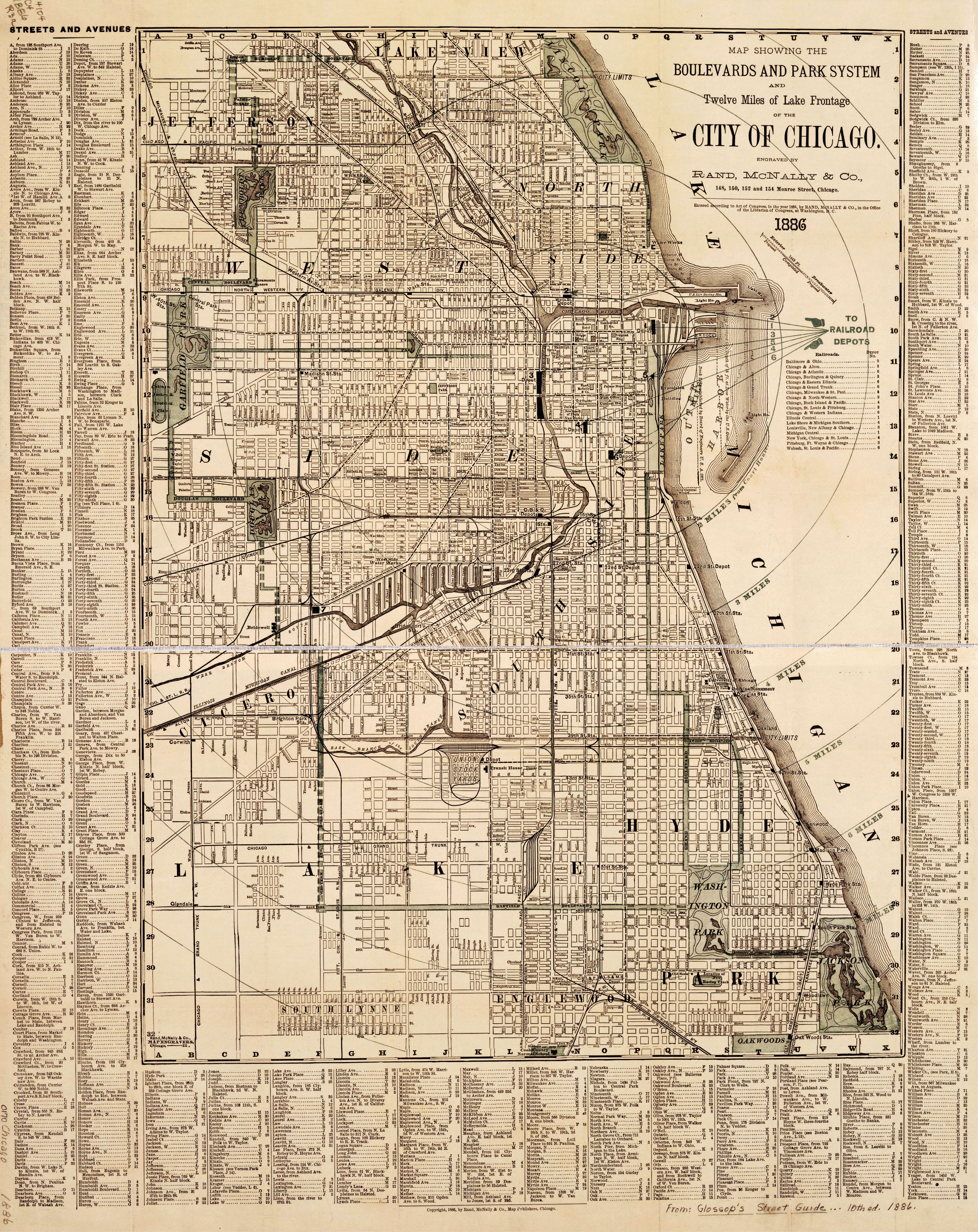
An 1886 map detailing the system of parks and boulevards that would circle the city.

Haussmann's renovation of Paris and New York's Greensward Plan in the 1850s and 1860s turned new attention to the role that parks can play in urban development. William Butler Ogden, the first mayor of Chicago, advocated for a state bill to create a large park on the South Side. Although initially rejected when proposed in 1868, the Illinois legislature accepted this plan in 1869. The objective was to create a system of parks and boulevards that would form a circle around Chicago.

In 1891, J. Frank Foster became the superintendent of the south Chicago park system. He advocated the spreading out of parks into working-class neighborhoods. These generally smaller parks would nonetheless be filled with playing fields and other facilities particularly 'field house' buildings. These facilities would provide all manner of recreation space and services to people of the surrounding neighborhoods. Olmstead's sons, Frederick Law Olmsted Jr. and John Charles Olmsted, designed many of the early neighborhood parks, and these ideas for neighborhood parks influenced national ideas of park design and programming.

== Facilities ==
The Chicago Park District manages 220 facilities in over 600 parks covering more than 8,800 acres (3,600 ha) of land throughout the city. This extensive network of parks also includes nine lakefront harbors over 24 miles (39 km) of lakefront, rendering the Chicago Park District the nation's largest municipal harbor system, along with 31 beaches, 17 historic lagoons, 86 pools, 90 playgrounds, 90 gardens, 66 fitness centers, nine ice skating rinks, 10 museums, a zoological park, and two plant conservatories.

Chicago Park District Park Boundaries

The Chicago Park District also maintains many special use facilities for activities such as golfing, boating, boxing, skating and baseball, as well as a number of specialty parks devoted entirely to dogs. In addition to maintaining its parks and facilities, the Chicago Park District holds thousands of community, holiday, nature, sports, music, arts, and cultural events and festivals for city residents every year, many featuring performances and workshops provided by nationally recognized "Arts Partners" such as the Chicago Symphony Orchestra and "Arts Partners in Residence" such as the Citywide Symphony Orchestra, the Albany Park Theater Project, Beacon Street Gallery and Theater, Billy Goat Experimental Theatre Company, Chicago Dance Medium, Chicago Moving Company, Chicago Swordplay Guild, Free Street Programs, K-Theory, Kuumba Lynx, The Peace Museum, Pros Arts Studio, the Puerto Rican Arts Alliance, and the Zephyr Dance Company. The height of these events are during the summer months at the height of the tourist season while children are out of school for summer recess.

== Architecture ==
The dominant theme in many of Chicago's park fieldhouses are variants of either Georgian or Classical Revival architecture. Clarence Hatzfeld designed more of these fieldhouses than any other architect, as well as many of the homes in Chicago's landmark Villa District.

Similar to other areas of Chicago's built environment, a sizeable number of structures in Chicago's Parks are of exceptional architectural value. Portage Park and Jefferson Park are both listed on the National Register of Historic Places, and some like Pulaski Park are official landmarks of the City of Chicago.

== Forest preserves ==
The green-space afforded by Chicago's parks is supplemented by the Cook County Forest Preserves, a separately administered network of open spaces containing forest, prairie, wetland, streams, and lakes, that are set aside as natural areas along the city's periphery.

== List of parks ==
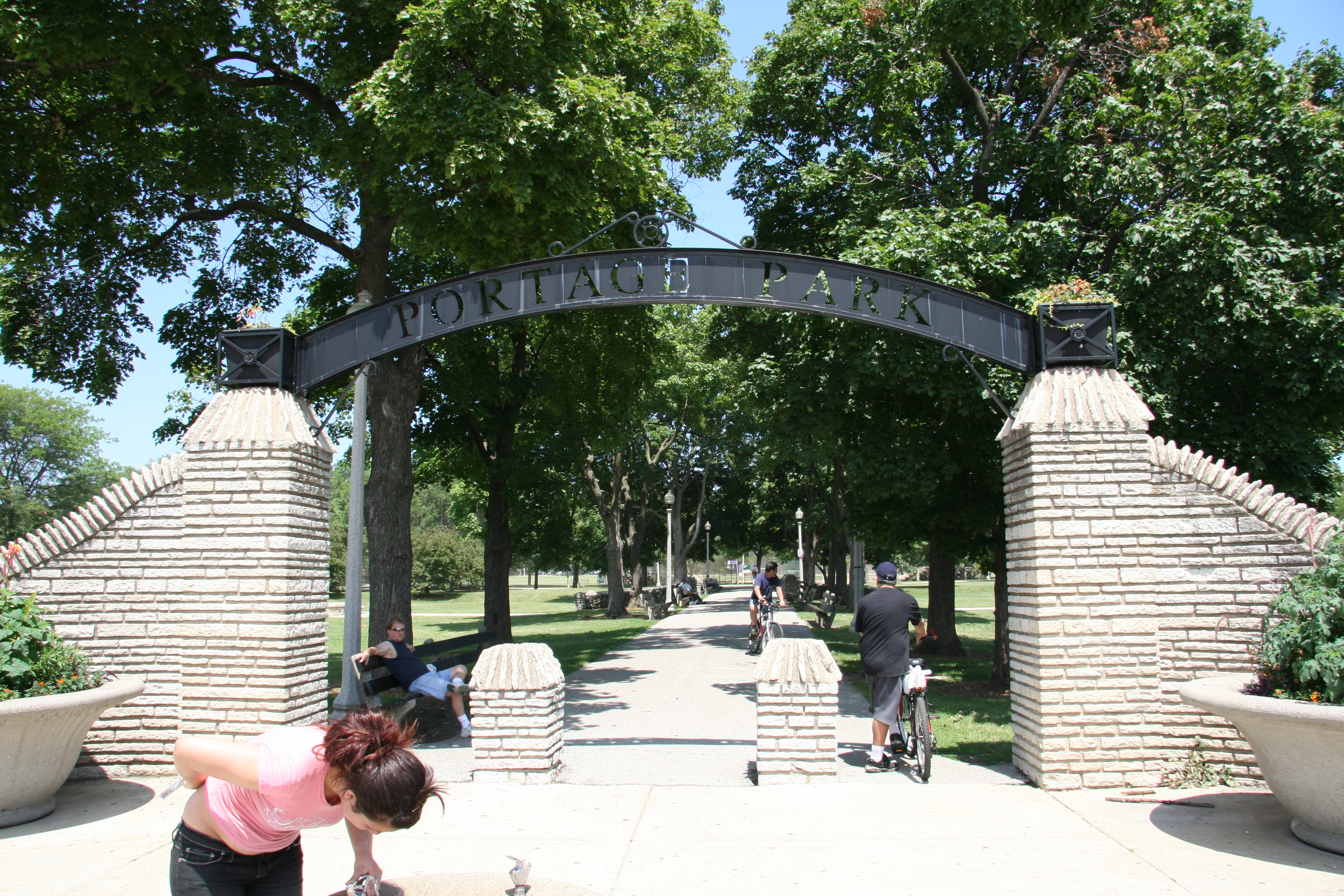
The southwestern entrance into Portage Park at the intersection of Irving Park Rd. and Central Ave.

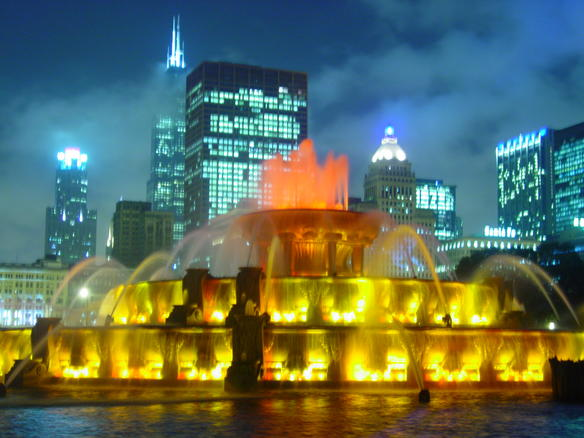
Buckingham Fountain, donated to Chicago in 1927 by Kate Buckingham

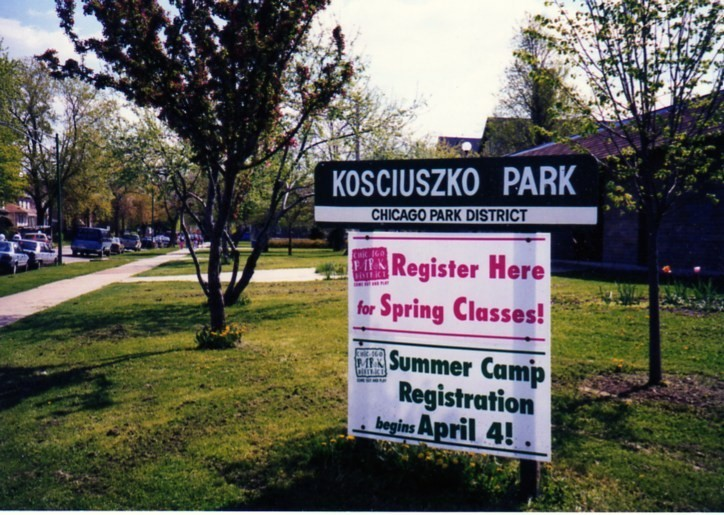
Kosciuszko Park is located by the intersection of Diversey and Pulaski.

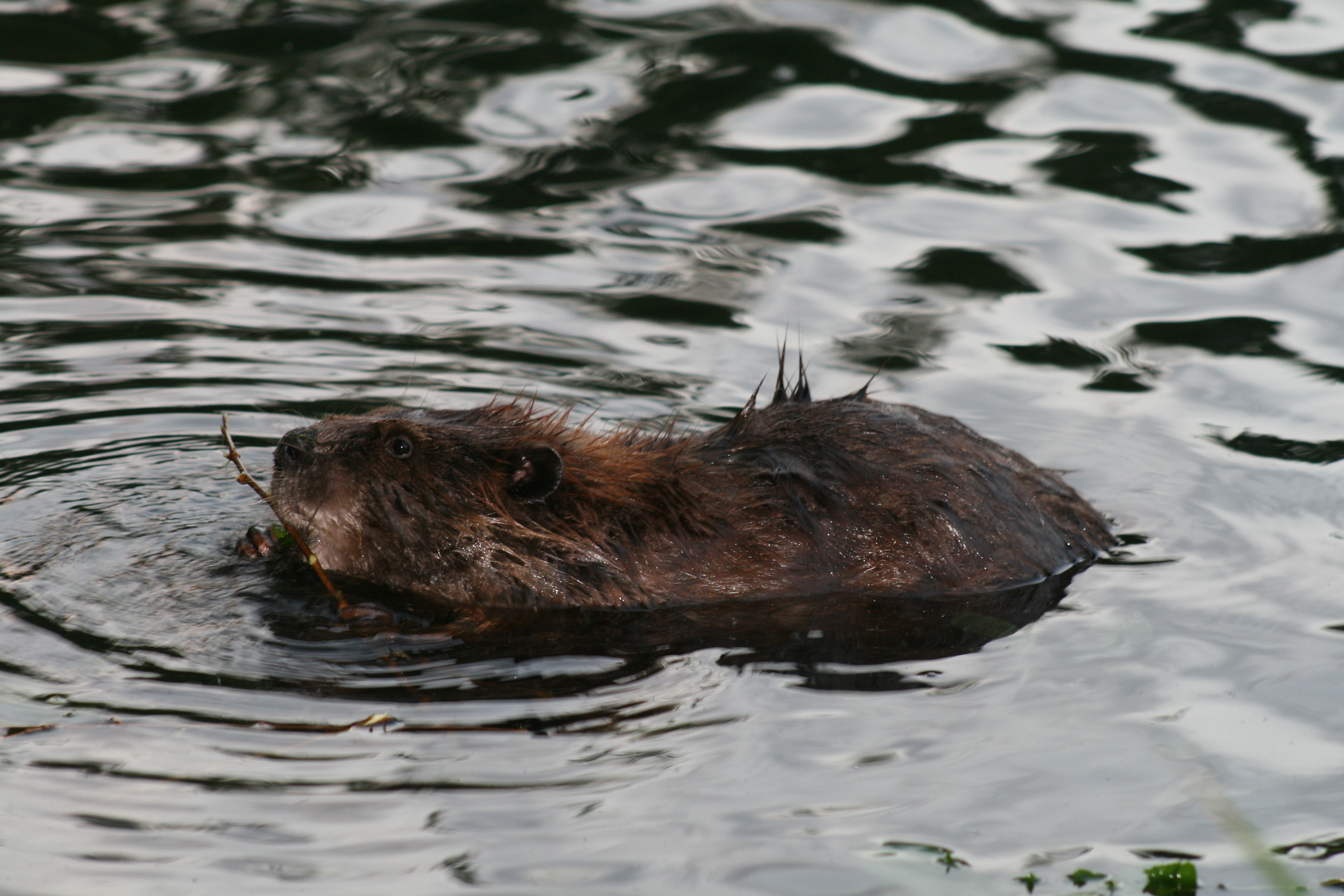
A beaver at the North Pond in Lincoln Park

=== Notable parks ===
- Burnham Park - 598 acres (242 ha); runs along the Lakefront for much of the South Side connecting Jackson Park with Grant Park.
- Calumet Park - 200 acres (81 ha); shares a border with the State of Indiana, and is also located on the lake.
- Columbus Park - 144 acres (58 ha); on the far west side of Chicago, considered one of the 150 Great Places in Illinois.
- Douglass (Anna and Frederick) Park - 173 acres (70 ha) and named after Frederick Douglass and his wife Anna Murray Douglass, it is Southwest of downtown.
- Garfield Park - 185 acres (75 ha); this west side park contains a grand conservatory and lagoon.
- Grant Park - 319 acres (129 ha); located in The Loop; Home to Buckingham Fountain, this downtown park is also a favorite site of major festivals including the Taste of Chicago, Chicago Blues Festival, Chicago Jazz Festival, Lollapolooza and others.
- Humboldt Park - 207 acres (84 ha) on the west side, was once a cultural center of Chicago's Puerto Rican Community and the site of a famous rally by pianist and statesman Ignace Paderewski that led to Poland regaining its independence after the First World War.
- Jackson Park - 500 acres (200 ha); located on the south side of the city on Lake Michigan, this park is famous for its role in the 1893 World's Columbian Exposition.
- Lincoln Park - 1,200 acres (490 ha); Chicago's largest city park. Located north of The Loop, this is one of the more distinctive parks in terms of geography, because while it is centrally located in the Lincoln Park community area it spans many different neighborhoods throughout the north side as it is nestled between Lake Shore Drive and Lake Michigan.
- Marquette Park - 300 acres (120 ha); the largest park in southwest Chicago, it has a golf course and many other attractions.
- Millennium Park - 24.5 acres (9.9 ha); Chicago's newest marquee park, opened in 2004, just north of the Art Institute of Chicago in Grant Park.
- Park No. 474 - 0.01 acres (0.0040 ha); the city and state's smallest park, with a total area of only 54 square feet, completely occupied by a sculpture.
- Washington Park - 372 acres (151 ha); located on the south side, it was the proposed location for the 2016 Summer Olympics Stadium.

== Arts Partners in Residence ==
Members of the Arts Partners provide quality cultural content to the parks of Chicago in exchange for the use of space within the park district. These Arts Partners include nationally recognized arts organizations serving park patrons and citizens of the public.

- Albany Park Theater Project (Eugene Field Park)
- Beacon Street Gallery and Theater (Clarendon Community Center)
- Billy Goat Experimental Theatre Company (Broadway Armory)
- Chicago Dance Medium (Seward)
- Chicago Moving Company (Hamlin)
- Chicago Swordplay Guild (Pulaski Park)
- Free Street Programs (Pulaski Park)
- K-Theory (LaFollette)
- Kuumba Lynx (Clarendon Community Center)
- Peace Museum (Garfield Park)
- Pros Arts Studio (Dvorak Park)
- Puerto Rican Arts Alliance (Humboldt Park)
- Zephyr Dance Company (Holstein).

== Gallery ==
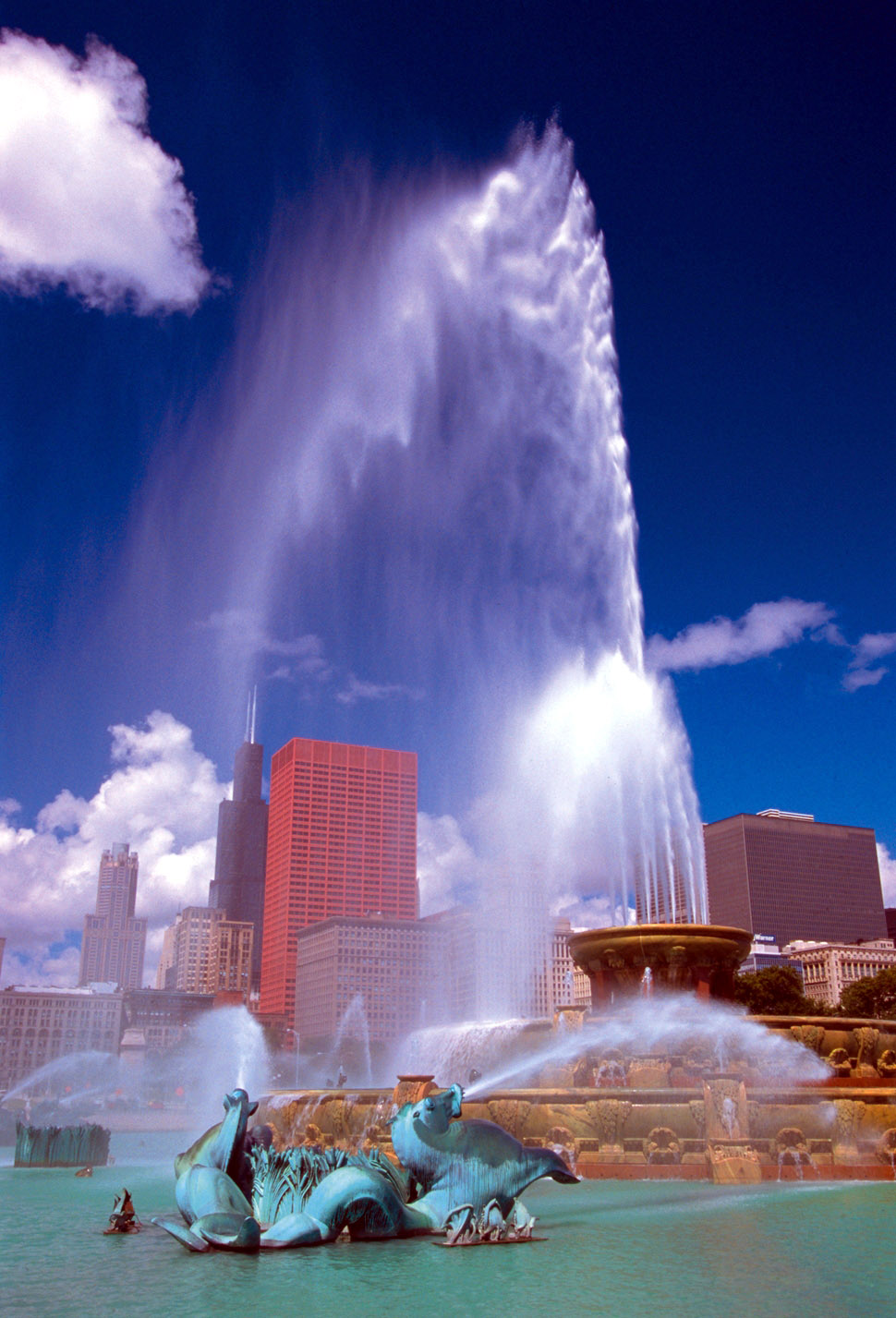
Buckingham Fountain, Grant Park

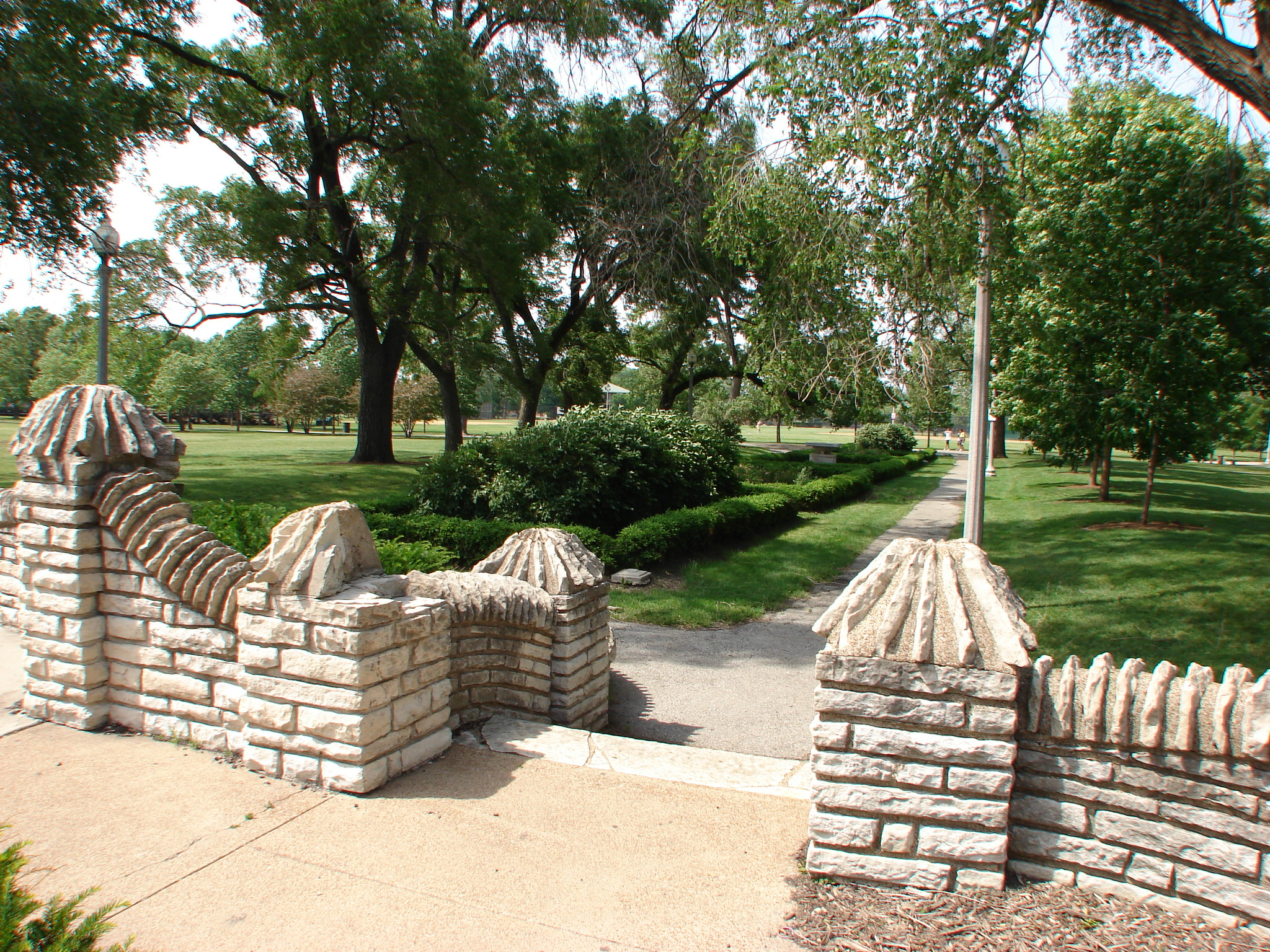
Flagstone steps in Portage Park

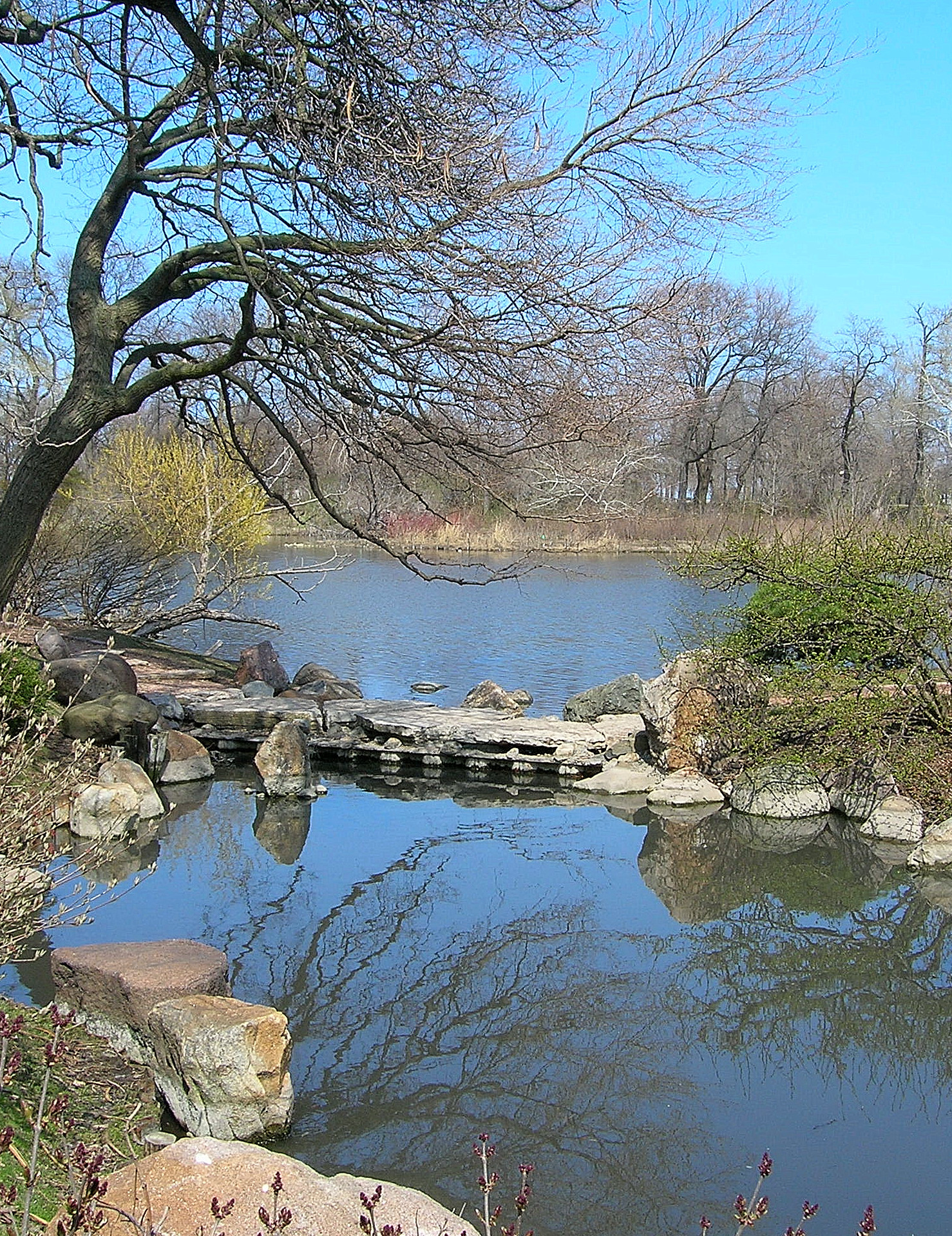
Garden of the Phoenix in Jackson Park

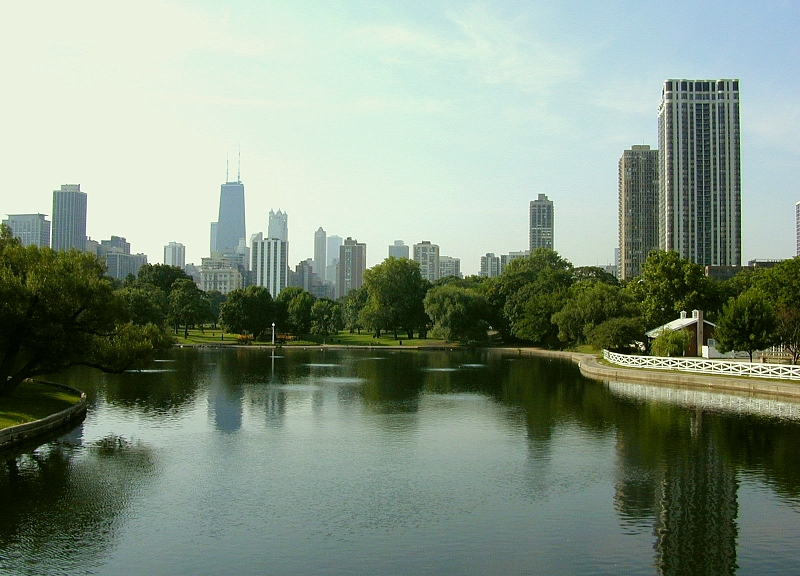
Lincoln Park Zoo

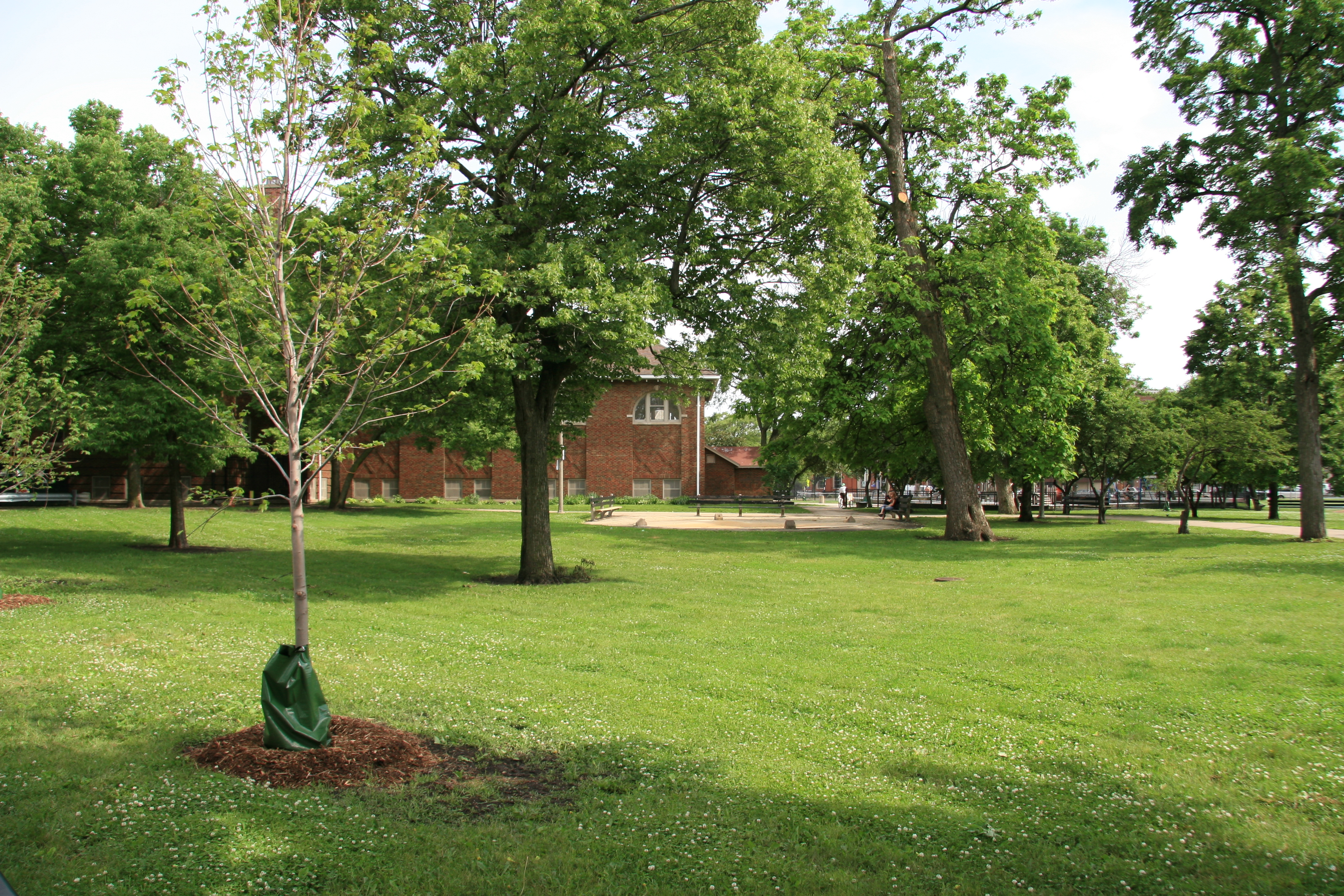
Jefferson Park with a view of the fieldhouse designed by Clarence Hatzfeld

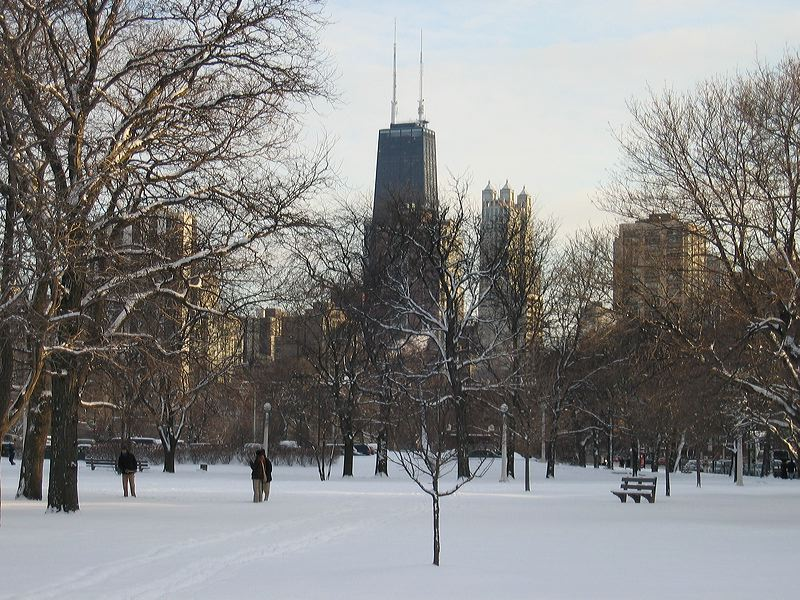
Lincoln Park in winter

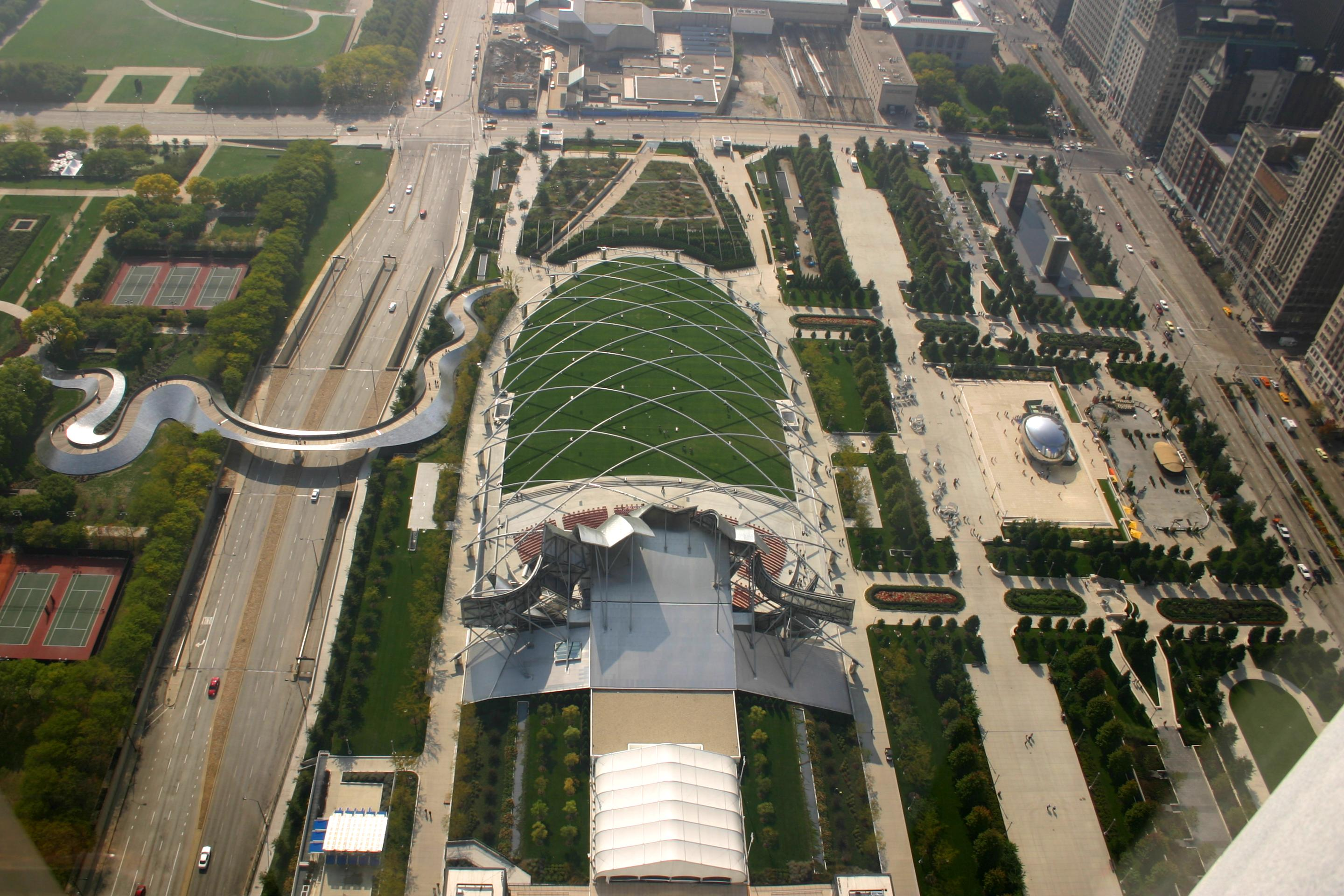
Millennium Park

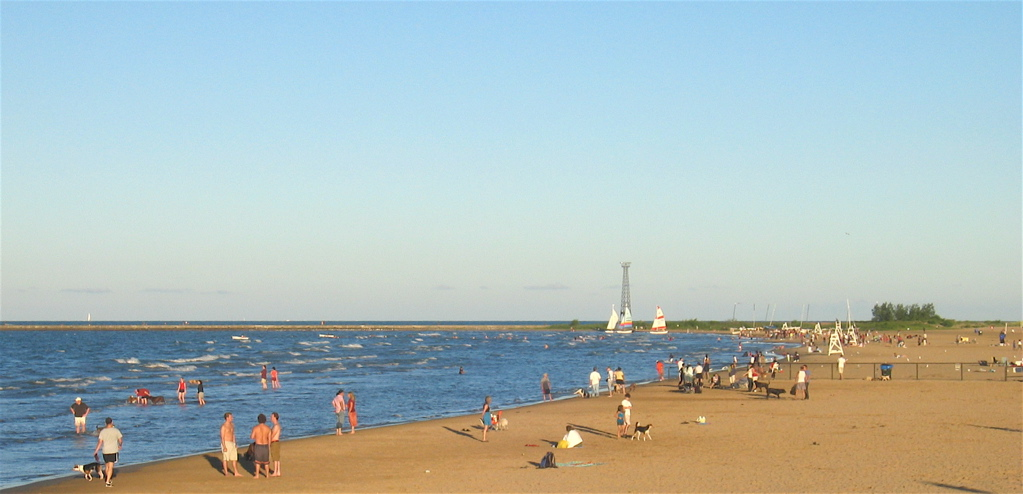
Montrose Beach

== See also ==
- Chicago beaches

== Bibliography ==
- Gilfoyle, Timothy J. (2006). Millennium Park: Creating a Chicago Landmark. Chicago: University of Chicago Press. ISBN 978-0-226-29349-3.
- Macaluso, Tony; Julia S. Bachrach & Neal Samors (2009). Sounds of Chicago's Lakefront: A Celebration Of The Grant Park Music Festival. Chicago's Book Press. ISBN 978-0-9797892-6-7.
- Fisher, Colin (2015). Urban Green: Nature, Recreation, and the Working Class in Industrial Chicago. University of North Carolina Press. ISBN 978-1-4696-1995-8.
- Rand McNally "Chicago & Cook County StreetFinder", 1996.
