= Palmisano Park =

Park in Chicago, Illinois

Palmisano (Henry) Park
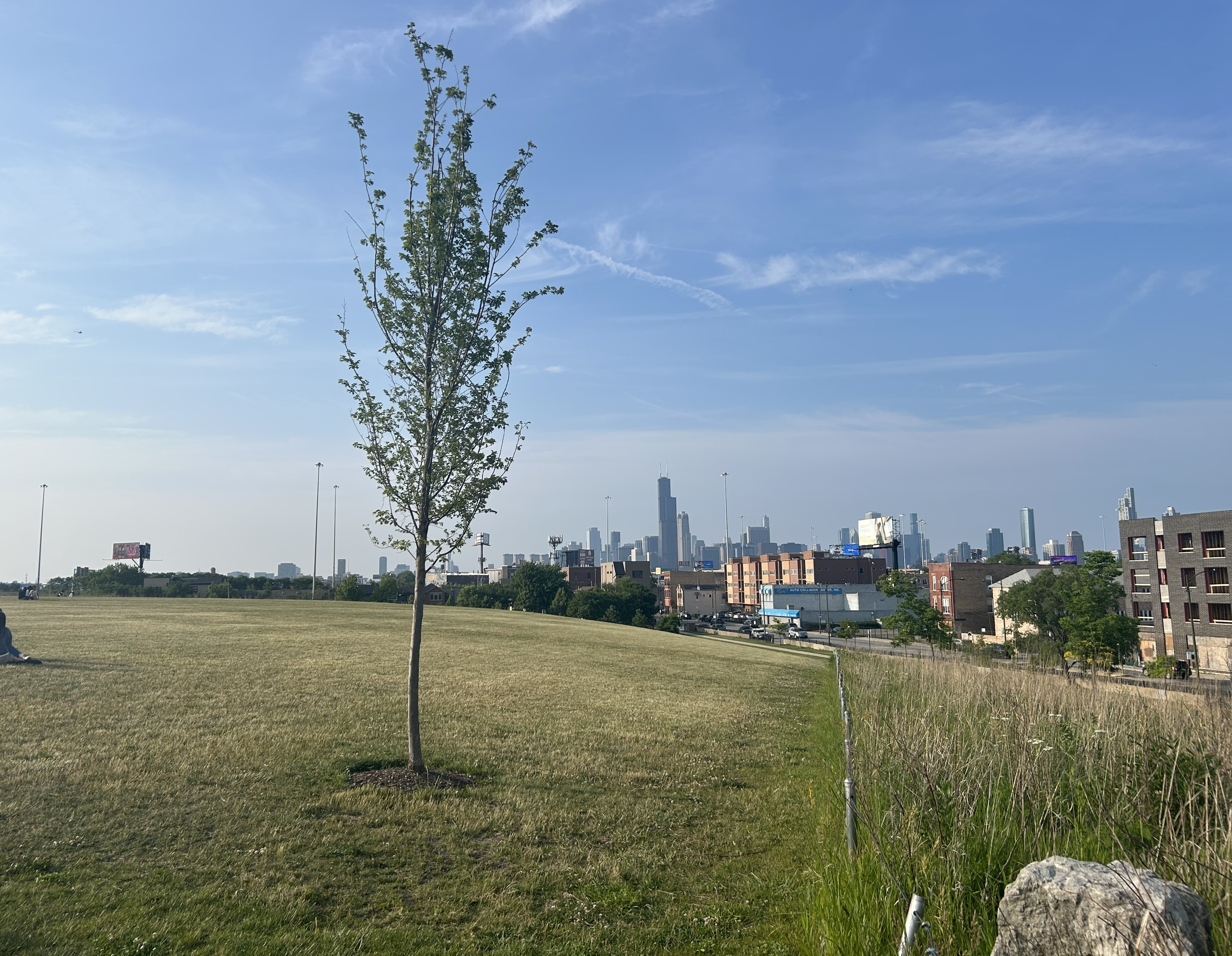
- View of the city from Palmisano Park
- Interactive map of Palmisano (Henry) Park
- Type: Urban Park
- Location: 2700 South Halsted Street, Chicago, IL 60608
- Coordinates: 41°50′35″N 87°38′55″W
- Area: 26.6 acres (10.8 ha)
- Created: 2009
- Operator: Chicago Park District

Henry C. Palmisano Park, or Palmisano Park is a 26.60-acre community park in the Bridgeport neighborhood of Chicago, Illinois. The park was first opened in 2009 as Stearns Quarry Park. It is part of the city's park system administered by the Chicago Park District, and serves as a recreational, cultural, and historical space in the South Side. The Palmisano Park Advisory Council helps to manage and support the park.

== History ==
400 million years ago, during the Silurian era, the area was a coral reef, which later formed into dolostone, the source of crushed stone aggregate used in concrete. Due to the makeup of dolostone, the stone contains a large quantity of fossils, some of which are housed in the Field Museum.

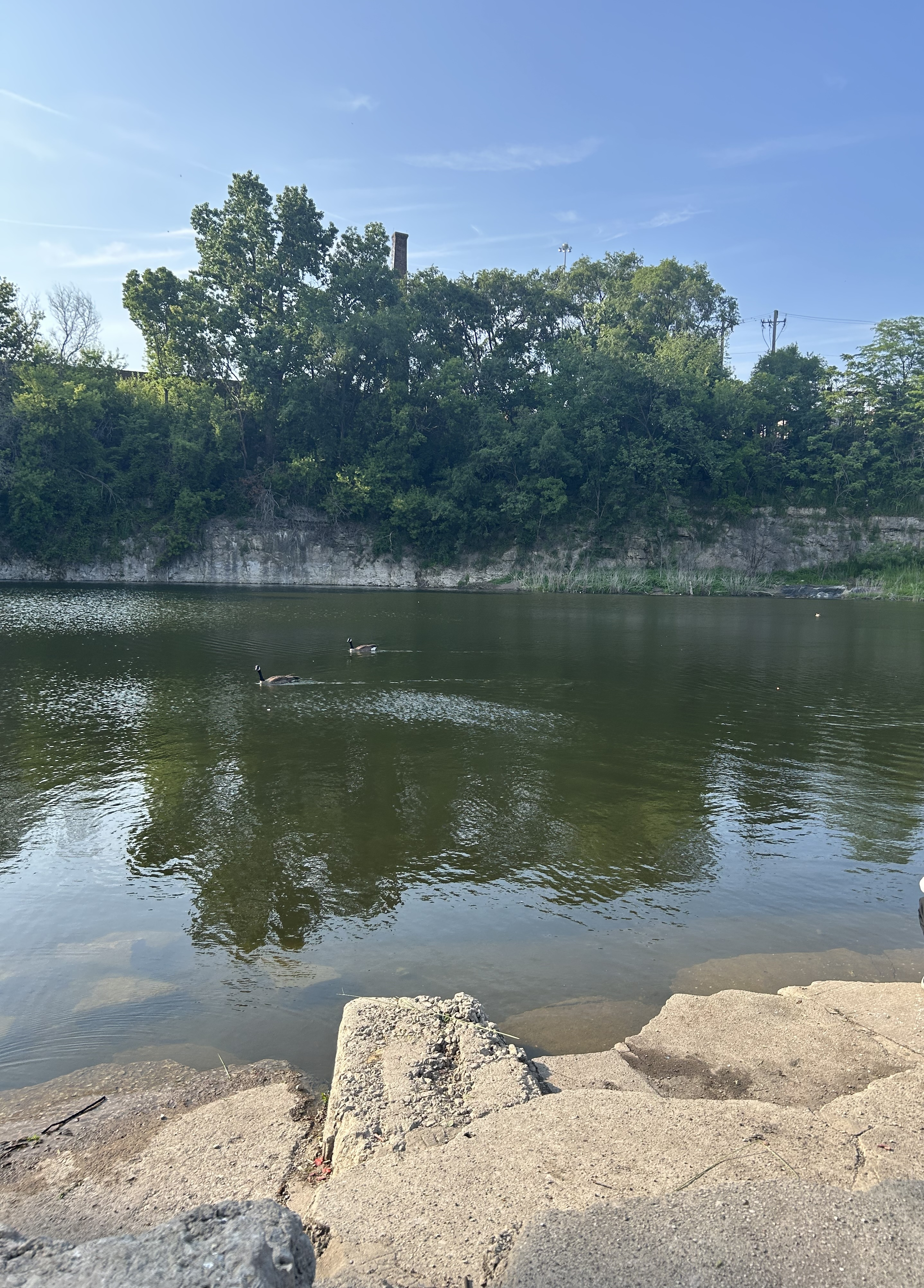
Fishing hole at Palmisano Park

The site of the park was acquired by Illinois Stone and Lime Company in the late 1830s and used as a quarry. The site was named Stearns Quarry after a partner at the company, Marcus Stearns. The quarry continued to operate until 1970. After 1970, the quarry was used as a dump for construction debris. Dumping activity ended in 1990, and the idea for converting the landfill into parkland emerged, especially due to the lack of existing green space in Bridgeport. Landscape Architecture firm Site Design Group was commissioned to design the new park, and the park opened in 2009 under the name Stearns Quarry Park.

== Features ==
The park includes over a mile of trails made out of reclaimed construction materials (including some from the Block 37 project), a wetland nature area planted with native plants, an open meadow, and a fishing hole with a pier offering catch-and-release fishing.
