= 1959 Pan American Games torch relay =

- Host city: Chicago, Illinois, USA
- Distance: 2,203 miles (3,545 km)
- Start date: July 25, 1959
- End date: August 27, 1959

The torch relay of the 1959 Pan American Games was held between July 25 to August 27, 1959, culminating in the Games' opening ceremony at Soldier Field in Chicago, Illinois, USA.

The torch was lit on July 25 at Cerro de la Estrella in Mexico City. It was carried 743 miles (1,196 km) across Mexico by members of the Asociación de Scouts de México, reaching the U.S.–Mexican border at Nuevo Laredo and Laredo, Texas on August 4. From there, the torch was carried across the United States to Chicago by members of the Boy Scouts of America. An estimated 3,000 Boy Scouts took part in the relay, each carrying the torch for one "Scout's Pace": 50 paces running followed by 50 steps walking. The torch run was conducted during daylight hours, and each night the torch was put on display.

In McAlester, Oklahoma, a local youth stole the torch and threw it in a ditch. The torch itself was damaged, but the relay continued as scheduled the next day. In Alton, Illinois, a support car slipped off an embankment into the Mississippi River. The car was carrying the base on which the torch was to sit overnight, as well as letters of congratulation from city officials along the relay route, which were lost in the incident.

The torch itself was symbolic: instead of a burning flame, the "Atomic Torch" consisted of a blue lightbulb surrounded by a chromium-plated model of an atom. The torch was designed by staff at Argonne National Laboratory near Chicago. Upon arrival at Soldier Field, the torch was connected to a string of cesium-137 pellets, which gave off radioactive impulses that were converted into an electrical signal, triggering the lighting of the Friendship Flame cauldron.

== United States route ==
Date	Locations	Map
August 4 August 5 August 6 August 7 August 8 August 9 August 10	Laredo, Texas to Cotulla; Cotulla to Devine; Devine to New Braunfels; New Braunfels to Georgetown; Georgetown to Waco; Waco to Waxahachie; Waxahachie to Melissa	1959 Pan American Games torch relay is located in Texas
August 11; August 12; August 13; August 14	Melissa to Atoka, Oklahoma; Atoka to McAlester; McAlester to Muskogee; Muskogee to Vinita	1959 Pan American Games torch relay is located in Oklahoma
August 15; August 16; August 17; August 18; August 19	Vinita to Joplin, Missouri; Joplin to Plano; Plano to Lebanon; Lebanon to St. James; St. James to Pacific	1959 Pan American Games torch relay is located in Missouri
August 20; August 21; August 22; August 23; August 24; August 25; August 26; August 27	Pacific to Alton, Illinois; Alton to Litchfield; Litchfield to Atlanta; Atlanta to Pontiac; Pontiac to Plainfield; Plainfield to La Grange; La Grange to Chicago City Hall; City Hall to Soldier Field	1959 Pan American Games torch relay is located in Illinois
