= Pulaski Park (Chicago) =

- Pulaski Park and Fieldhouse
- U.S. National Register of Historic Places
- Chicago Landmark
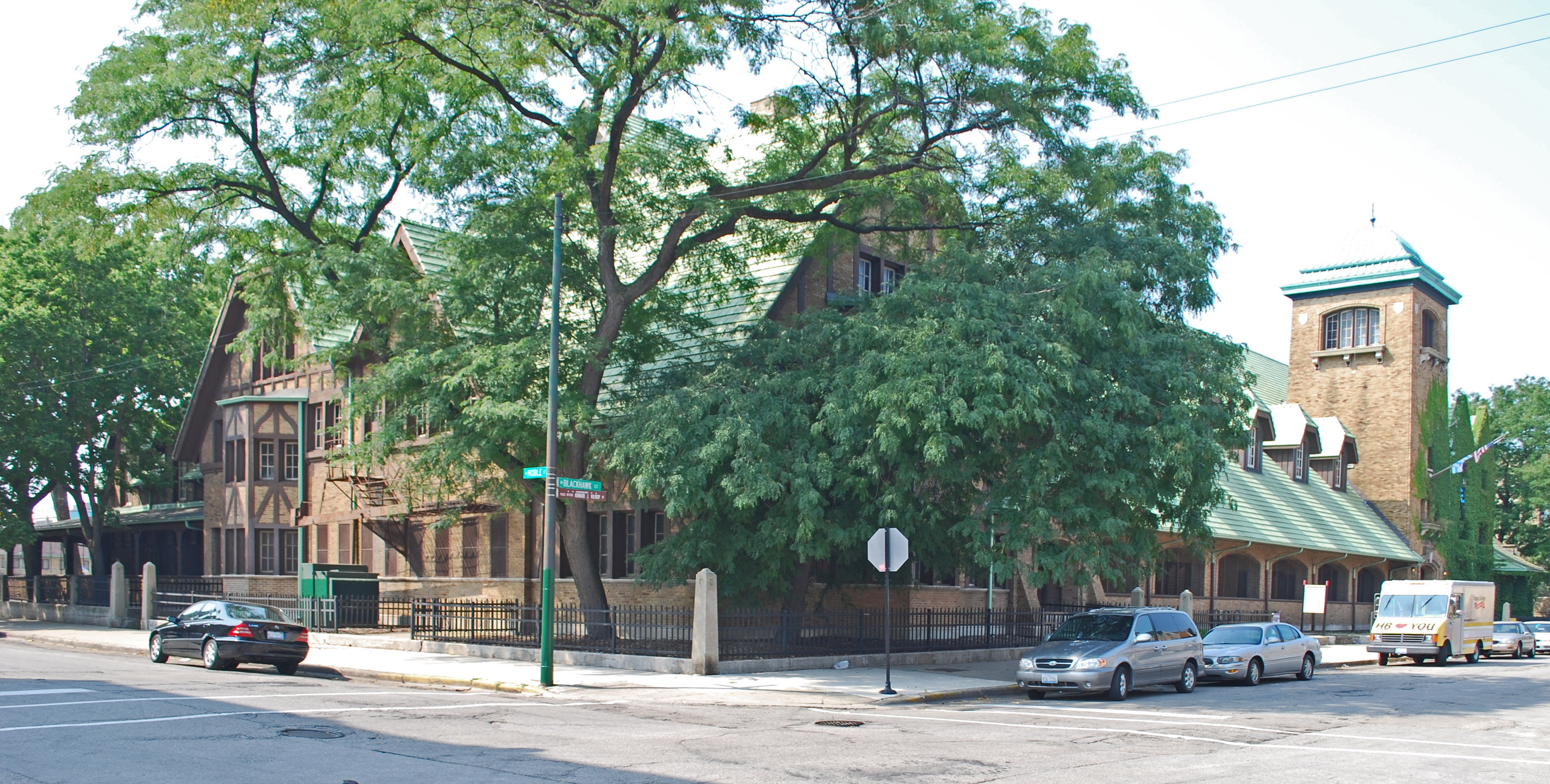

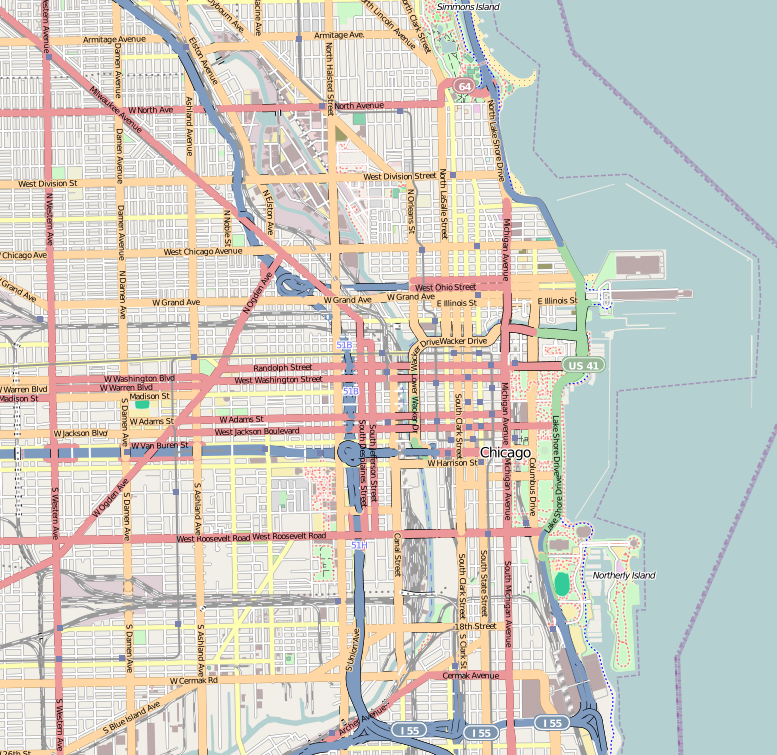
- Location within Central Chicago
- Location: 1419 W Blackhawk Street, Chicago, Illinois
- Coordinates: 41°54′21″N 87°39′47″W
- Area: 3.8 acres (1.5 ha)
- Built: 1912–14
- Architect: W.C. Zimmerman
- Architectural style: Tudor Revival
- NRHP reference No.: 81000217

Significant dates
- Added to NRHP: August 13, 1981
- Designated CHICL: July 29, 2003

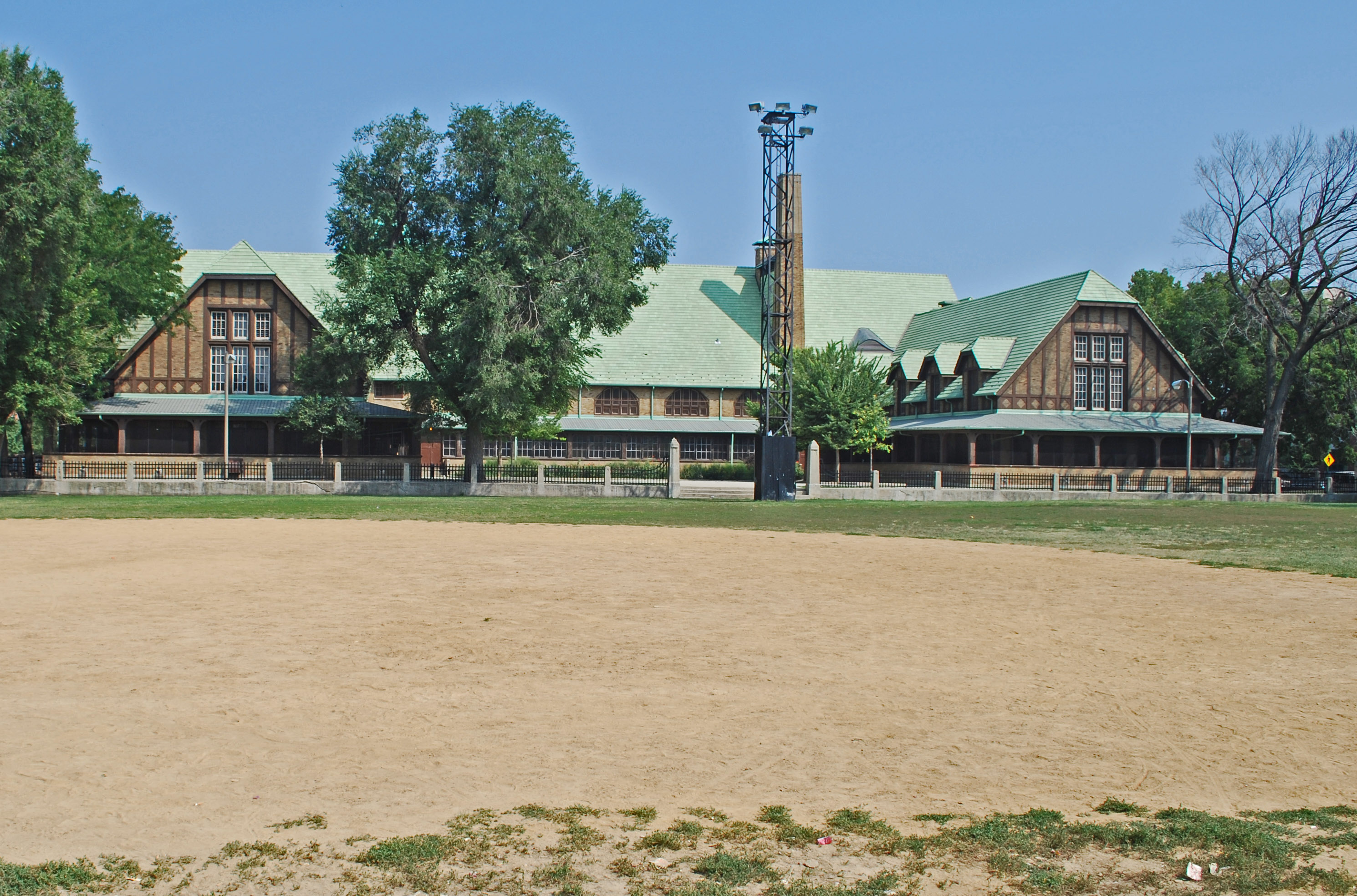

Pulaski Park is a park in the West Town neighborhood of Chicago, Illinois. It was founded in 1912, and was named after American Revolutionary War hero Casimir Pulaski.

Pulaski Park derives its name from the historic park and fieldhouse that was designed by Jens Jensen between 1912 and 1914. 1,200 people were displaced, leading to the razing of a number of buildings while others were moved to nearby locations in the neighborhood.

The park and fieldhouse were listed on the National Register of Historic Places on August 13, 1981. The fieldhouse was designated an official Chicago Landmark on July 29, 2003; a plaque can be found inside the building at the Blackhawk Street entrance.

The neighborhood in the park's vicinity within West Town is called Pulaski Park after the park.

== See also ==
- Parks of Chicago
- Chicago Swordplay Guild
- List of Chicago Landmarks
- National Register of Historic Places listings in West Side Chicago
