= Flagstone =

Generic flat stone usually used for paving

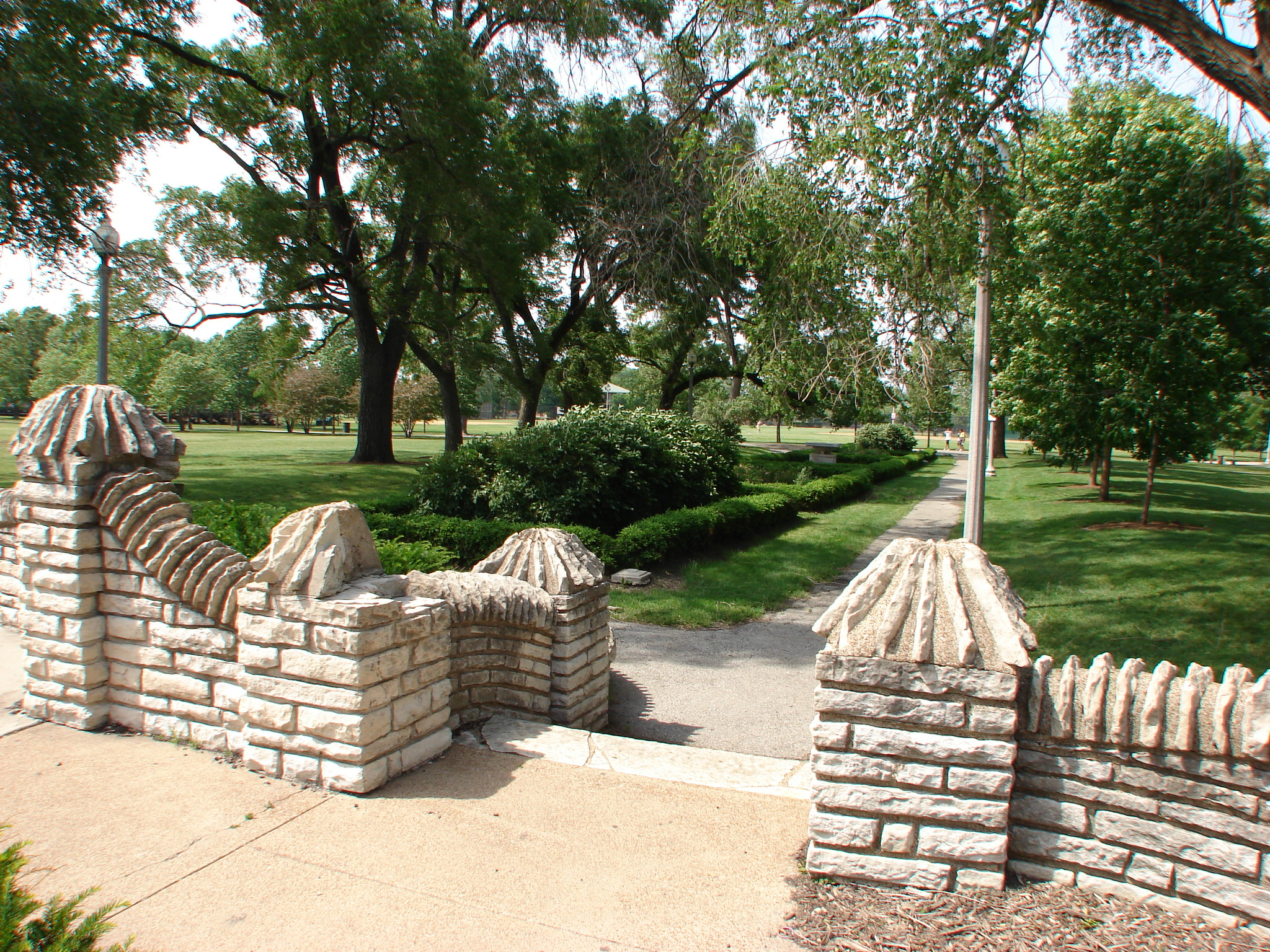
Portage Park in Chicago is known for its flagstone decorations.

A flagstone, or flag, is a generic flat stone, sometimes cut in regular rectangular or square shape and usually used for paving slabs or walkways, patios, flooring, fences and roofing. It may be used for memorials, headstones, facades and other construction. The name derives from Middle English flagge meaning turf, perhaps from Old Norse flaga meaning 'slab' or 'chip'.

== Quarrying and usage ==
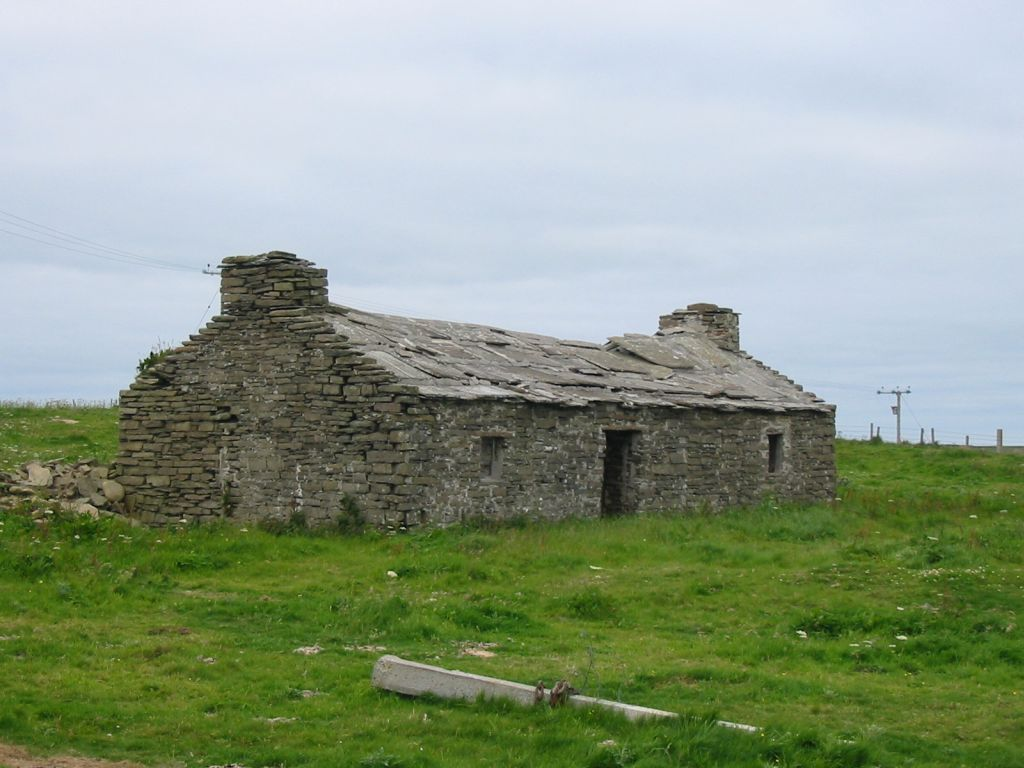
House on Westray, Orkney, with flagstone roof

Flagstone originates as a sedimentary rock that is split into layers along bedding planes. Flagstone is usually a form of a sandstone composed of feldspar and quartz and is arenaceous in grain size (0.16 mm – 2 mm in diameter). The material that binds flagstone is usually composed of silica, calcite, or iron oxide. The rock color usually comes from these cementing materials. Typical flagstone colors are red, blue, and buff, though exotic colors exist.

Flagstone is quarried in places with bedded sedimentary rocks with fissile bedding planes.

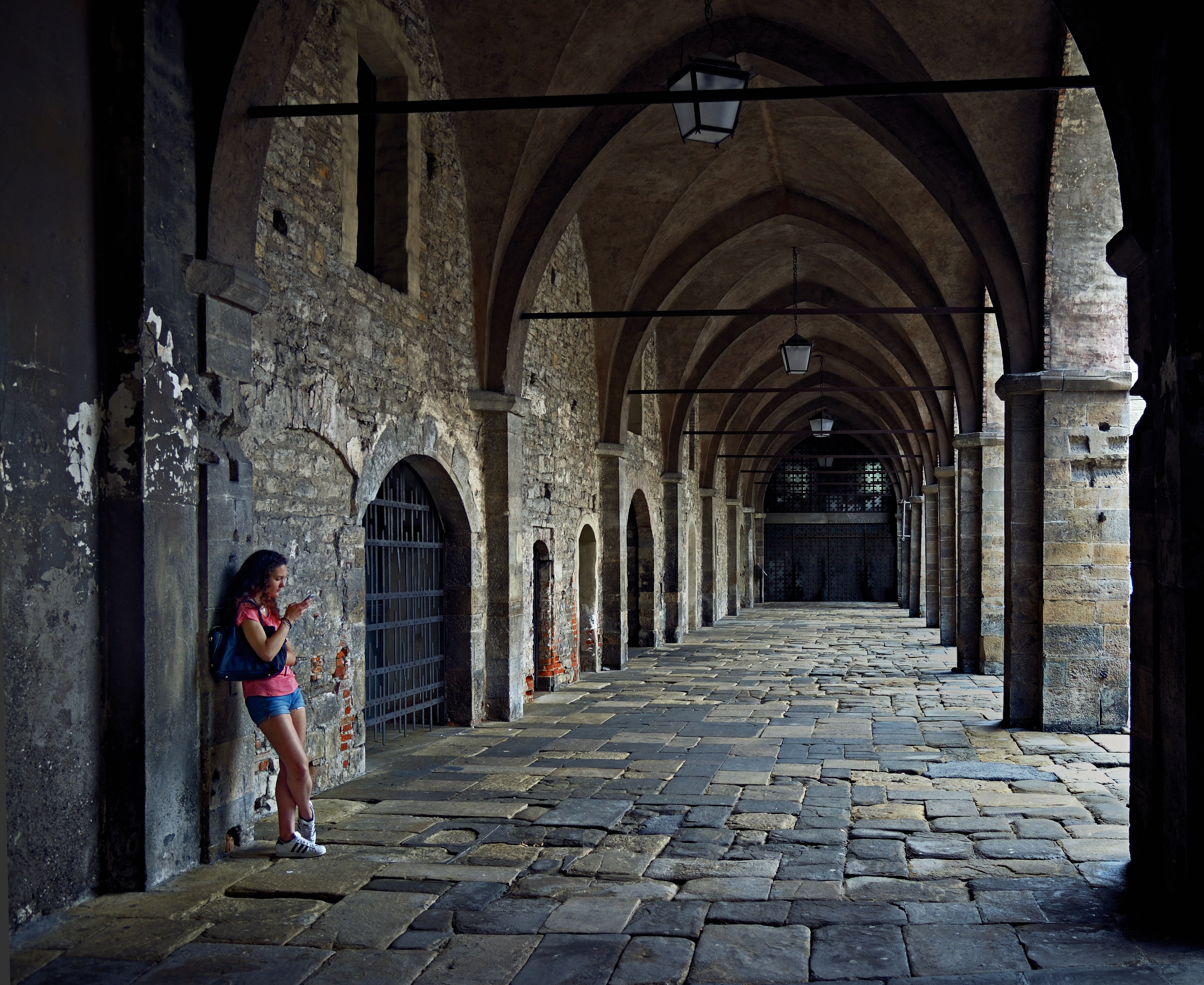
Flagstones of various sizes. University of Bergamo, Italy.

Around the thirteenth century, the ceilings, walls and floors in European architecture became more ornate. Anglo-Saxons in particular used flagstones as flooring materials in the interior rooms of castles and other structures. Lindisfarne Castle in England and Muchalls Castle (14th century) in Scotland are among many examples of buildings with surviving flagstone floors.

Flagstone shingles are a traditional roofing material, and are a type of roof shingle commonly used in the Alps, where they are laid dry – often held in place with pegs or hooks. In the Aosta Valley, Italy, buildings in historical areas are required to be covered in stone shingles.

== See also ==
- Slate in buildings
- Stone wall
- Step-stone bridge
- Patio
- Pavement
