= Shoreland Hotel =

Apartment building in Chicago, Illinois

The Shoreland
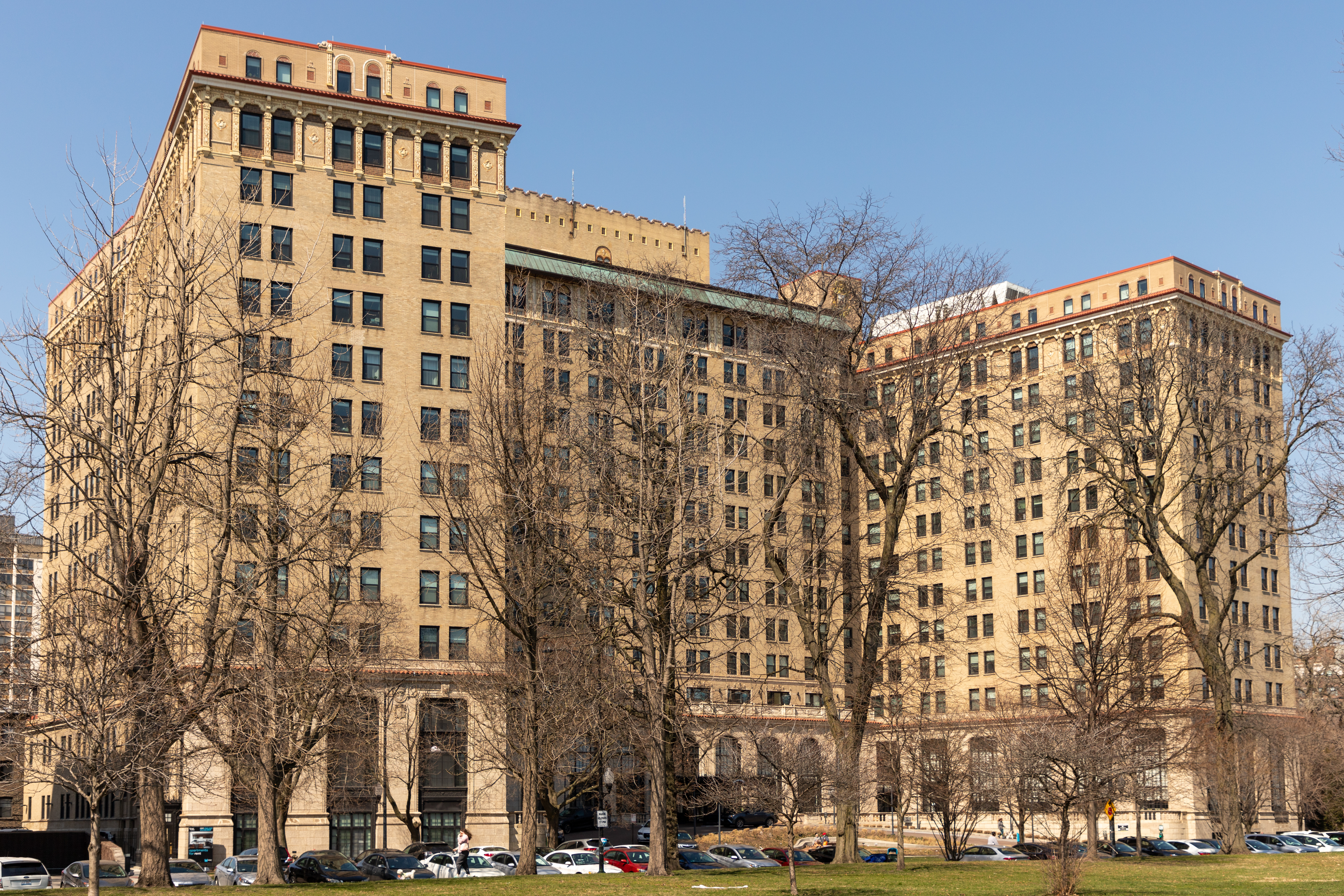
- The Shoreland, formerly the Shoreland Hotel, Chicago
- Former names: Shoreland Hotel; Shoreland Hall

General information
- Status: Completed
- Location: Hyde Park, Chicago, United States
- Coordinates: 41.7962°N 87.5815°W
- Opened: 1926

Website
- shorelandchicago.com
- The Shoreland
- U.S. National Register of Historic Places
- NRHP reference No.: 86001201
- Added to NRHP: 1986

The Shoreland is a historic hotel building in the Hyde Park neighborhood of Chicago, Illinois. It was added to the United States National Register of Historic Places in 1986. Opened in the 1920s, it served hotel guests in luxury accommodations. Later, it was as a residence hall of the University of Chicago for many years, before being converted to an apartment building in 2013.

== History ==
The Shoreland Hotel was opened in 1926 by Harry Fawcett, who reportedly spent $2 million on furnishings alone. The Shoreland Hotel maintained 1,000 guest rooms over 13 floors, a crystal ballroom, a large banquet hall with a top-notch restaurant and an immaculate lobby with 30-foot-high ceilings. Its terra-cotta exterior featured gargoyles and other elaborate stonework. It hosted countless wedding receptions and parties for Chicago's elite, including a massive banquet held when Amelia Earhart returned triumphantly in 1928 to the Hyde Park neighborhood where she had attended high school. Later, Al Capone was known to conduct "business" in certain rooms. In the 1950s, Jimmy Hoffa kept a room in the hotel and often held raucous union meetings there. As the story goes, one of Hoffa's underlings choked the hotel manager, Maurice Bellows in the lobby after he dared to ask the union boss to pay his debt to the hotel. Marge Bellows was the Shoreland's owner at the time, making the hotel the largest in the country with a woman in charge. Another notable resident was Milton Friedman, who occupied rooms in the Shoreland at the same time as Hoffa. Elvis Presley also spent several nights at the Shoreland.

Then vice-president Joseph Biden visited the Shoreland in 2016 to launch the NCI Genomic Data Commons, a harmonized cancer data repository designed to support precision medicine.

=== Shoreland Hall, University of Chicago ===
Over time the hotel began to lose its splendor, and in the 1970s it was sold for $750,000 to the University of Chicago. It then became a dormitory, known as Shoreland Hall, and housed approximately 650 undergraduate students. However, in the spring of 2004 the university decommissioned the Shoreland as a dormitory, citing increasing maintenance costs and decreasing popularity among incoming students. It remained in use by the university through spring quarter of 2009, after which it was turned over to a Chicago developer that specializes in historical preservation.

The university sold the Shoreland for $6 million to Kenard Corporation, who had planned to turn it into 260 condominiums. Hal Lichterman, the president of the corporation, had said he hoped to put a restaurant in the old banquet hall and would otherwise gut the building. In fall 2006, after Hal Lichterman's death, Kenard resold the Shoreland for $10 million to R.D. Horner & Associates, one of the three initial bidders on the property. Horner & Associates planned to carry out Kenard's exact plans for converting the dormitory into condominiums. They had originally intended to open the building as early as late 2009, but in April 2007 the university exercised its option to keep the Shoreland open as a dormitory for the 2008–09 academic year.

=== Shoreland luxury apartments ===
The Shoreland was sold yet again to New Jersey–based Antheus Capital (through its 5454 S. Shore Drive LLC holding) in August 2008 for $16 million. Antheus Capital and MAC Property Management decided to develop its own plans for the Shoreland. Antheus took over the lease with the University of Chicago, expiring in 2009. It was converted to apartments and reopened in 2013 with a total of 330 units.

== See also ==
- Housing at the University of Chicago
