= Villa District =

Historic district in Illinois, United States

- Villa Historic District
- U.S. National Register of Historic Places
- U.S. Historic district
- Chicago Landmark
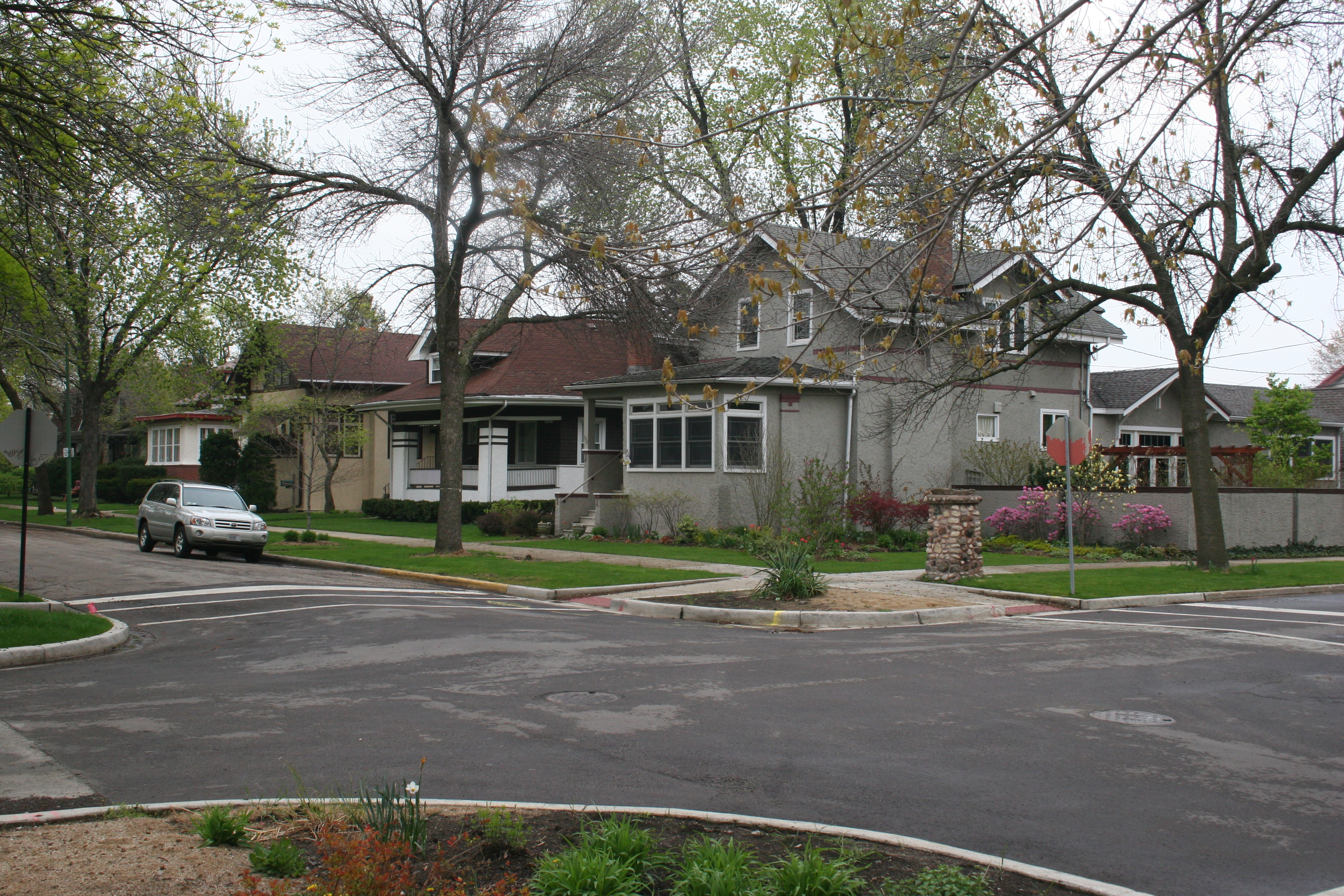
- Intersection of Springfield and Waveland Avenues

- Location within Chicago metropolitan area
- Location: Chicago, Illinois, United States
- Coordinates: 41°56′56″N 87°43′38″W
- Built: 1902; 1913
- Architect: Clarence Hatzfeld, Arthur Knox
- Architectural style: Bungalow/Craftsman
- NRHP reference No.: 79000830 (original); 83000316 (increase)

Significant dates
- Added to NRHP: 11 Sep 1979 (original); 10 Mar 1983 (increase)
- Designated CHICL: November 23, 1983

The Villa District, also known as Villa Historic District, (Polish: Polskie Wille) is a historic district in Chicago, Illinois, United States. It is located on Chicago's Northwest Side within the community area of Irving Park. Its borders are along Pulaski Road to the west, Metra's Union Pacific Northwest Line to the north, Hamlin Avenue to the east, and Addison Street to the south. Located directly north of the Wacławowo area of Avondale, the Villa District is serviced by the Blue Line's Addison street station.

The district was built in 1902 by a number of architects, many of them visibly influenced by Frank Lloyd Wright's Prairie Style of architecture. Most notable among these were bungalows designed by the architectural firm of Hatzfeld and Knox, whose partner Clarence Hatzfeld would later design the field house and natatorium at Portage Park. The area was originally developed as the "Villa addition to Irving Park" and showcases many unique Craftsman and Prairie style homes fronting on picturesque boulevard style streets. Although St. Wenceslaus church, a majestic Romanesque-Art Deco hybrid draws many of the tourists visiting the area, this historic church is actually a few blocks south of the district's formal boundaries.

The Villa district was the northwest "bookend" for Chicago's vaunted Polish Corridor along Milwaukee Avenue that extended from Division and Ashland Avenue at Polonia Triangle. Journalist Mike Royko famously dubbed the area as the Polish Kenilworth after the posh suburb of Chicago's North Shore.

The Villa Historic District was added to the National Register of Historic Places on September 11, 1979. Its area was increased on March 10, 1983 by the addition of the Villa Apartments, 3948-3952 and 3949-3953 W. Waveland Ave.

The Villa District was designated a Chicago Landmark on November 23, 1983.
