= Portage Park (Chicago park) =

- U.S. National Register of Historic Places
- U.S. Historic district
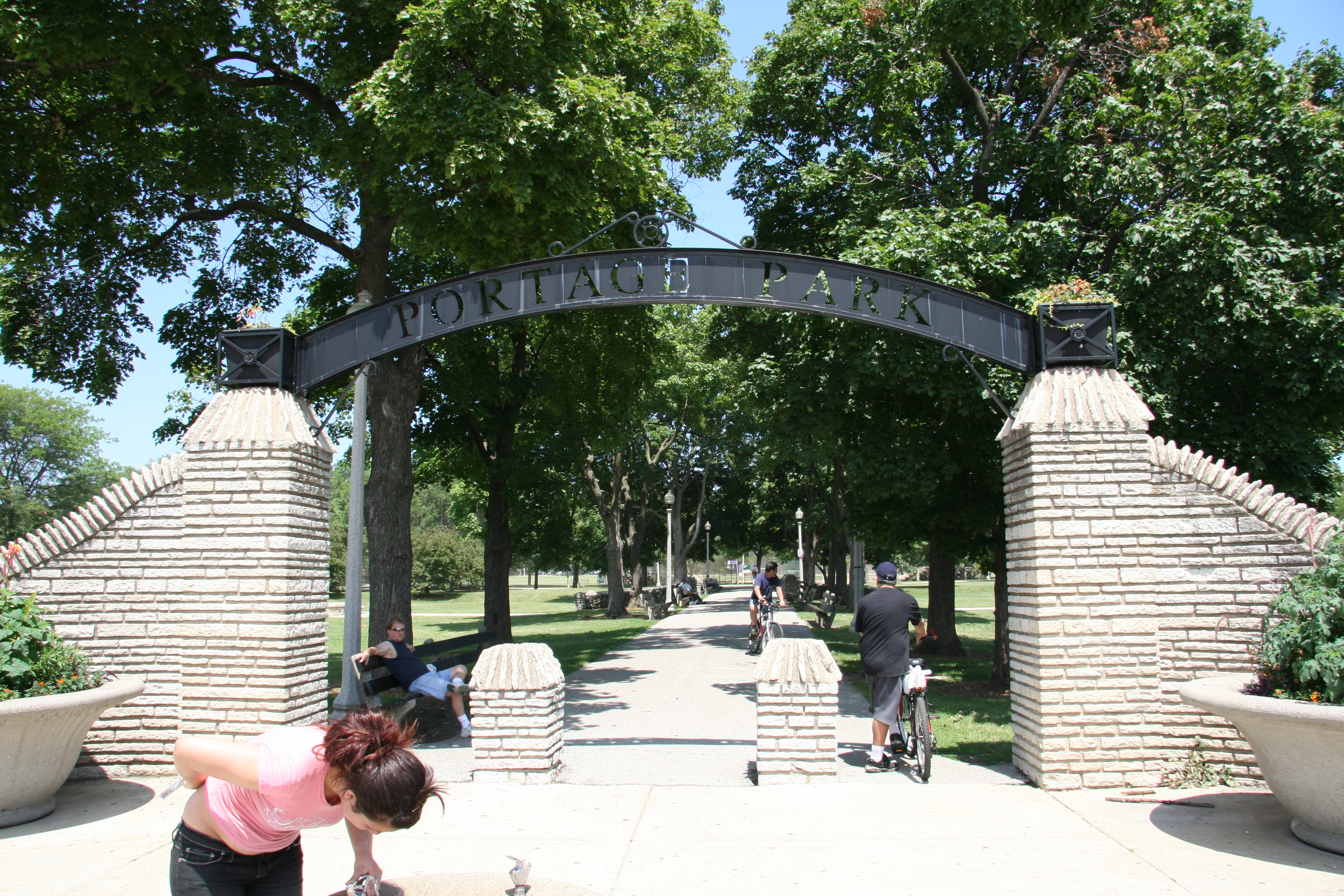
- Flagstone gate at the southwestern entrance into Portage Park at the intersection of Irving Park Rd. and Central Ave

- Location within Chicago metropolitan area Location within Illinois Location within the United States
- Location: 4100 N. Long Ave., Chicago, Illinois
- Coordinates: 41°57′18″N 87°45′52″W
- Built: 1913
- NRHP reference No.: 95000484
- Added to NRHP: 1995

Portage Park is a 36-acre (15 ha) park in the Portage Park community area of Chicago, Illinois on the National Register of Historic Places. The park stretches from Irving Park Road on the south to Berteau Avenue between Central and Long Avenues. The largest public park on Chicago's Northwest Side, it has many recreational facilities including six tennis courts, two playgrounds, a slab for in-line skating, a bike path, a nature walk, five baseball fields, two combination football/soccer fields and two fieldhouses— one housing a gymnasium and the other a cultural arts building. The park also has an Olympic-size pool featuring a large deck for sunning, misting sprays, as well as an interactive water play area with slide and diving boards in addition to a smaller heated pool. Plans are currently underway for the development of a new, 6,500-square-foot (600 m^{2}) senior center at Portage Park.

== History ==
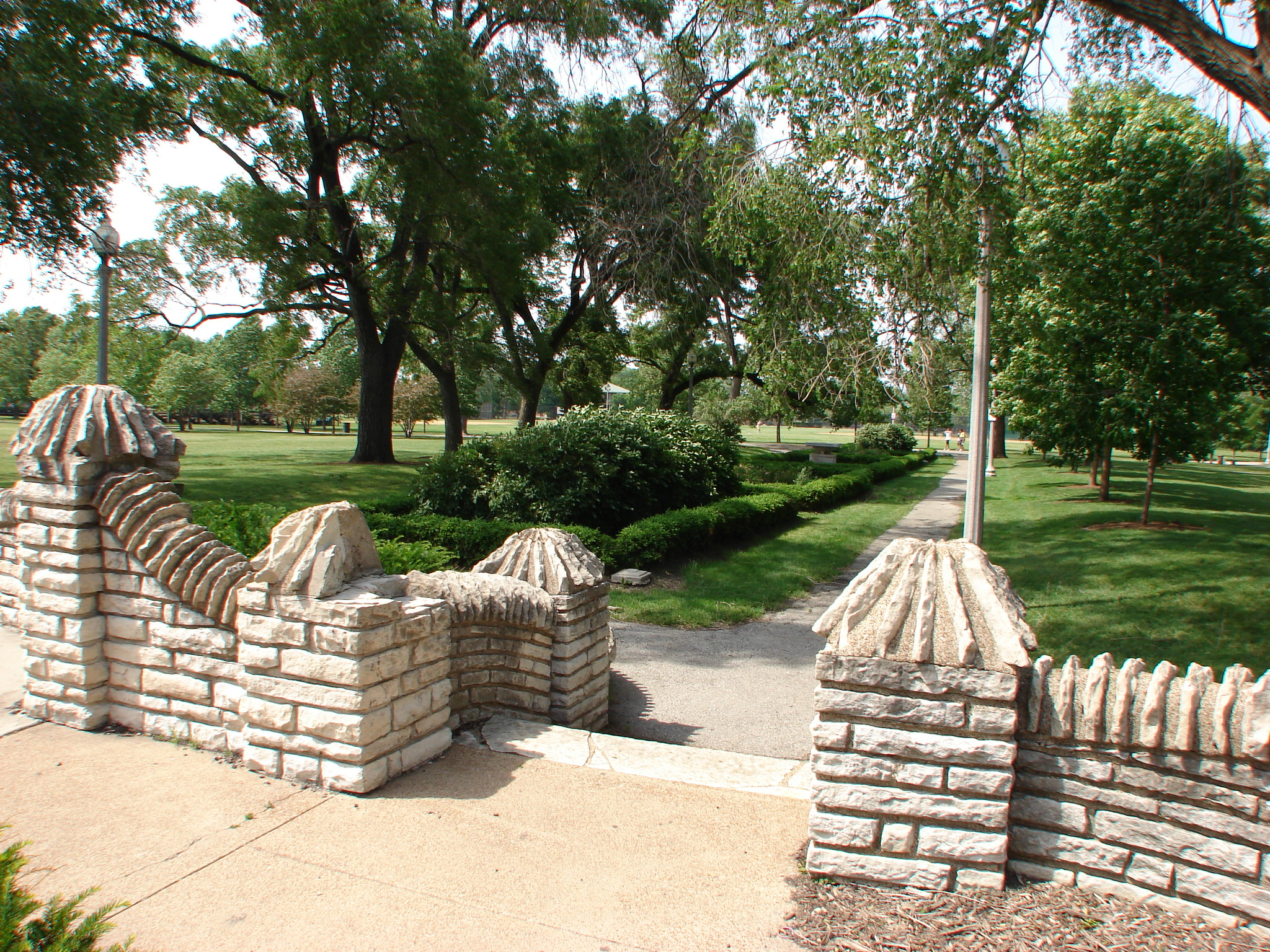
Portage Park is known for the flagstone decoration all over its grounds

Portage Park was not only the site that gave the area its name, it created the neighborhood by bringing together what had been several distinct communities that were populated by a slew of diverse ethnicities. The park came into being in 1913 when area residents formed an independent park board called the Old Portage Park District. The name of the new park district is a reference to the route that ran along what is today Irving Park Road that had once been used by Native Americans and fur traders to portage their canoes between the Des Plaines and Chicago Rivers.

The original plan for Portage Park was drawn up by American Park Builders Company who were also responsible for the initial construction that took place between 1913 and 1917. The park design included a naturalistic swimming lagoon, which opened to the public in July, 1916. A fieldhouse and gymnasium were added in the 1920s, designed by Clarence Hatzfeld, whose architectural firm of Hatzfeld and Knox would later design many of the Prairie and Craftsman-style bungalows in the nearby Villa District by historic St Wenceslaus Church. Portage Park quickly became the center of the community, providing athletics and team sports, cultural and club activities, festivities and special events for residents of Chicago's Northwest Side.

The park in Portage Park originally had a dirt bottom pond that blended into a cement bottom pool. The hill to the east of the pool that exists now, was the dirt that was removed when the pool was first created when the park was first established. The pond portion of the pool extended to the western edge of this 'hill'.

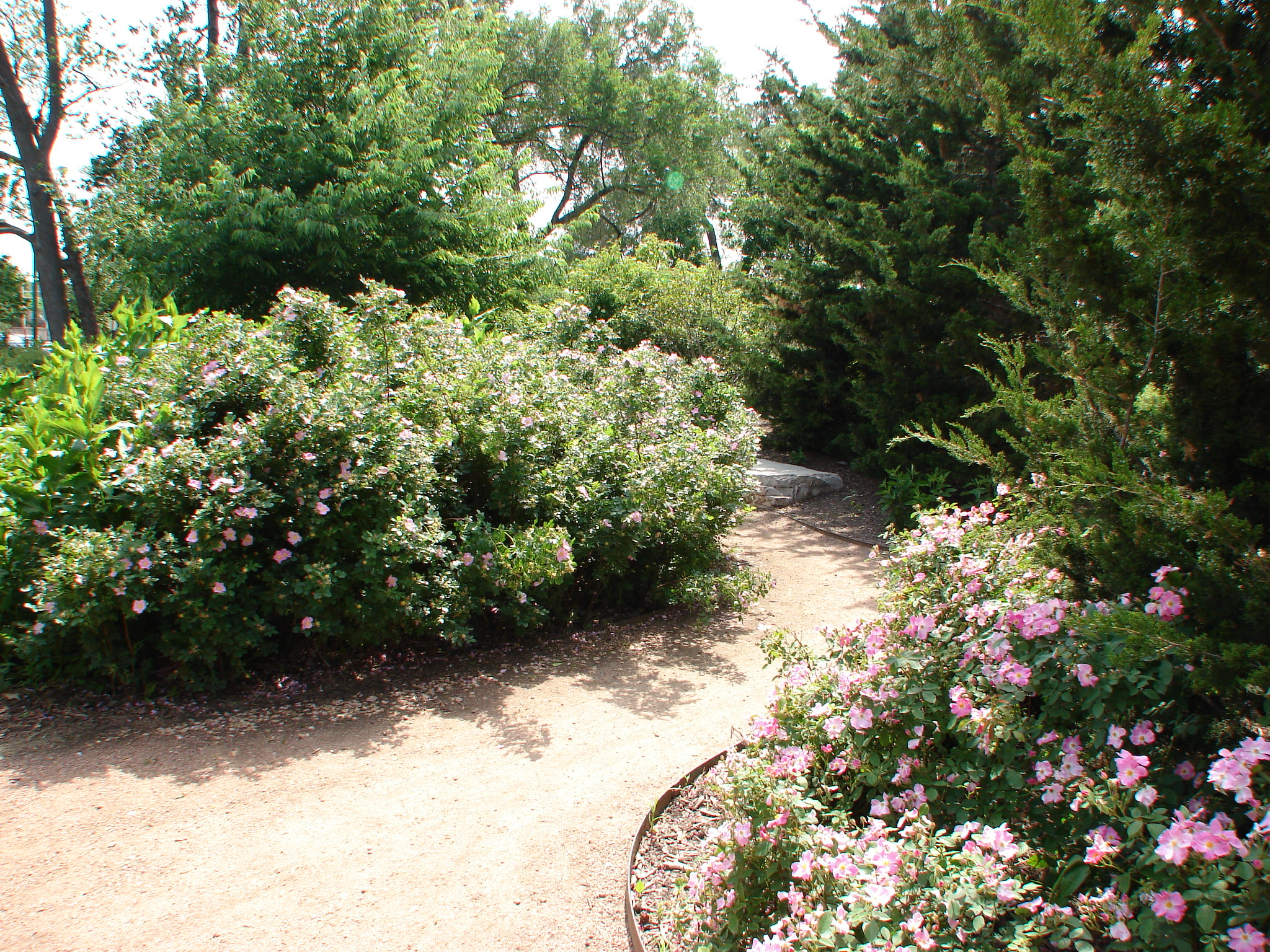
A footpath in Portage Park

In 1934, the city's 22 independent park commissions were consolidated into the Chicago Park District, and the new agency soon secured federal funds through the Works Progress Administration. WPA improvements at Portage Park included additional plantings, stonework fountains and gateways, and a comfort station. WPA workers also removed the original swimming lagoon and constructed a kidney-shaped concrete pool. The WPA was very involved in the creation of the long gone Rock House at the south end of Portage Park. This Rock House had another small pond area that had goldfish and flower basins, with the water in it kept at a substantial depth to support the fish over winter. This goldfish pond was later filled as a result of the polio epidemic in the 1940s, although the flower planters to the north and east of the main entrance off Central at Irving Park Road will give an idea of just what this Rock House looked like. There were seats throughout the half circle structure of flagstone. Except for the overhead wooden canopy, every where you looked there was white flagstone - walls, seats, floor, support pillars. The Chicago Park District has WPA photos of the structure. The park predates all of the buildings that surround it.

In 1959, the park district replaced the concrete pool with an Olympic-sized pool in preparation for hosting the Pan American Games. In 1972, Portage Park hosted the U.S. Olympic swimming trials, where gold medalist Mark Spitz set new world's records. In 1998, the swimming pools and plaza area were rehabilitated while an interactive water play area was created for children.
