= Nelson Algren bibliography =

A list of the published work of Nelson Algren, American writer.

== Books ==
- Somebody in Boots (1935)
- Never Come Morning (1942)
- The Neon Wilderness (1947), a collection of short stories
- The Man with the Golden Arm (1949), concerns morphine addiction
- Chicago: City on the Make (1951)
- A Walk on the Wild Side (1956)
- Nelson Algren's Own Book of Lonesome Monsters (1962)
- Who Lost an American? (1963)
- Conversations with Nelson Algren (1964)
- Notes from a Sea Diary: Hemingway All the Way (1965)
- The Last Carousel (1973)
- The Devil's Stocking (1983)
- America Eats (1992)
- He Swung and He Missed (1993)
- The Texas Stories of Nelson Algren (1994)
- Nonconformity (1996)
- Notes From a Sea Diary & Who Lost an American (Seven Stories Press, 2009)
- Algren, Nelson (2009). Horvath, Brooke; Simon, Dan (eds.). Entrapment and other writings. New York: Seven Stories Press. ISBN 9781583228685.

== Short fiction ==
Title	Year	First published in	Reprinted in
The lightless room	2009	Algren, Nelson (2009). Horvath, Brooke; Simon, Dan (eds.). Entrapment and other writings. New York: Seven Stories Press. ISBN 9781583228685.	Granta 108 (Autumn 2009)
