= Polonia Triangle =

Plaza in Chicago, Illinois, US

Coordinates: 41°54′13″N 87°40′02″W

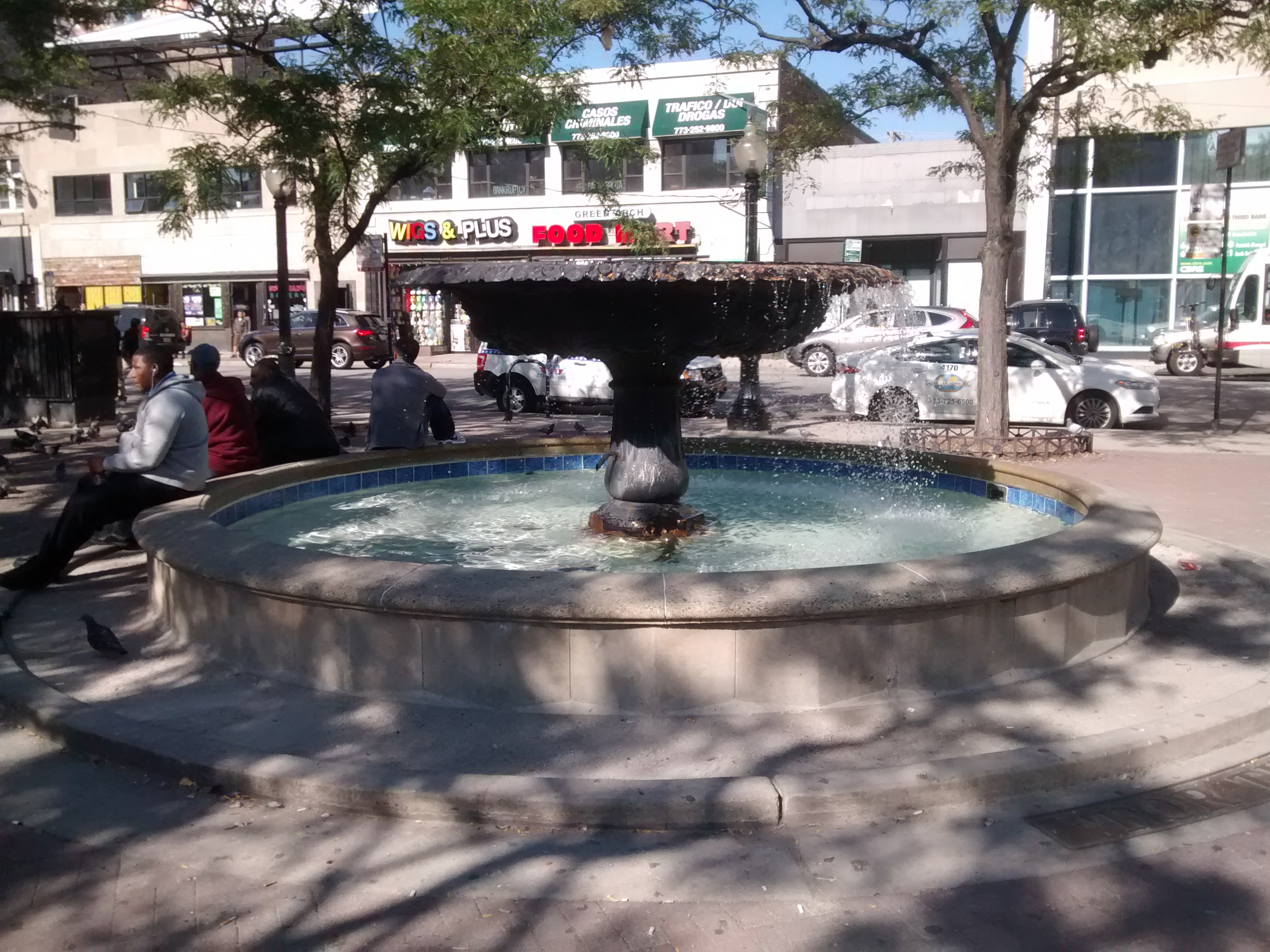
The Nelson Algren Memorial fountain

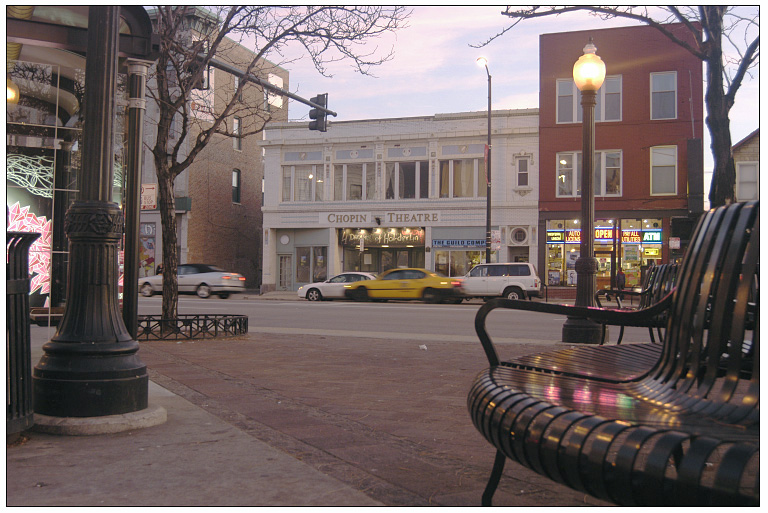
Chopin Theatre seen from Polonia Triangle

Polonia Triangle (Polish: Trójkąt Polonijny), or the Polish Triangle, is a plaza located in West Town, in what had been the historical Polish Downtown area of Chicago. A single-tiered fountain made of black iron with a bowl about nine feet in diameter is installed at its center. Polonia Triangle derives its name from the Polish word Polonia ("Polish diaspora"), which itself comes from the Latin name for Poland. Polonia Triangle was considered to be the center or town square of Chicago's Polish Downtown, the city's oldest and most prominent Polish settlement.

== Location and surroundings ==
The Triangle is bounded by Division Street on the south, Ashland Avenue on the west, and Milwaukee Avenue on the northeast.

Organizations located within its vicinity include the Polish National Alliance to the Polish Daily News. Polonia Triangle is one of 11 neighborhoods included in The Labor Trail which chronicles Chicago's history of working class life and struggle. The Chopin Theatre is located across Division Avenue from the Triangle. The area is used for processions during Corpus Christi by parishioners of two of Chicago's Polish Cathedrals: St. Stanislaus Kostka and Holy Trinity Polish Mission.

The Blue Line's Division/Milwaukee station is also located at the Polonia Triangle.

== History ==
In 1998, a plan to rename the plaza after writer Nelson Algren (1909–1981), was opposed by members of Chicago’s Polish community due to Algren’s depiction of crime in his novels. A compromise was reached in 1998, where the Triangle kept its name and a newly installed fountain was named after Algren and inscribed with a quote from his 1951 essay Chicago: City on the Make: "For the masses who do the city's labor also keep the city's heart".

In 2007, Zygmunt Dyrkacz, owner of the Chopin Theatre, led a campaign to redevelop the Triangle as "the gateway to Wicker Park".

In 2009, the Metropolitan Planning Council, in collaboration with the Placemaking Movement and WPB (Wicker Park/Bucktown), collectively initiated a project aimed at the redevelopment and renovation of Polonia Triangle.

In November 2026, the City of Chicago's first self-cleaning public toilet opened in the Triangle.
