= Chopin Theatre =

Performing arts venue in Chicago, Illinois, US

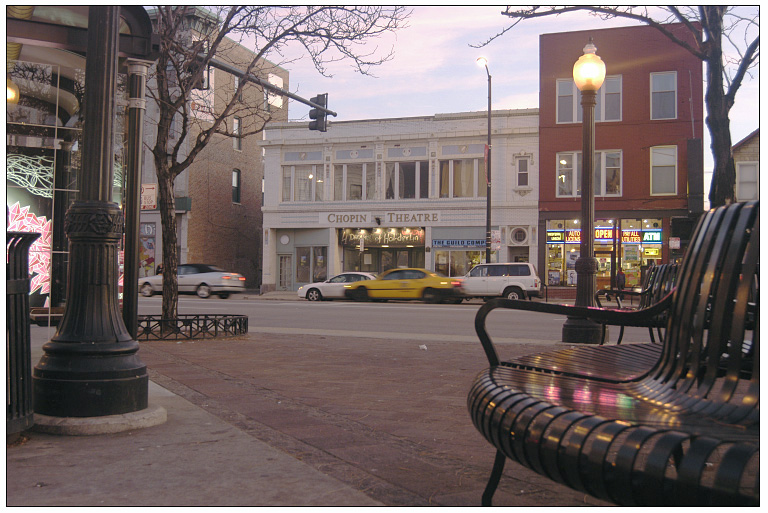
- Interactive map of Chopin Theatre
- Address: 1543 W. Division St; Chicago, IL 60642; US
- Coordinates: 41°54′11″N 87°40′0″W
- Owner: Zygmunt Dyrkacz and Lela Headd Dyrkacz
- Capacity: 226 Main; 175 Studio

Construction
- Opened: 1918
- Reopened: 1990
- Architects: Worthmann & Steinbach Architects

Website
- chopintheatre.com

Chopin Theatre is an independent performing arts venue located in Wicker Park, Chicago. Reopened in 1990 by Zygmunt Dyrkacz, a Polish immigrant, the theater has become a significant cultural hub known for its eclectic programming and commitment to avant-garde and experimental performances. Since 1990, Chopin Theatre has hosted over 2,100 presentations as well as its own productions, ranging from theater and dance to music and literary events. The venue is particularly renowned for showcasing international works, especially from Eastern Europe.

== Theater ==
According to the Theater Historical Society of America, the Chopin Theatre building opened in March 1918, was designed by architects Worthmann & Steinbach and operated by Victor Bardonski as a 546-seat nickelodeon theater. In 1926 it was renamed the Harding and seating was expanded to 987. By 1932 it was again called Chopin Theatre but in 1948 underwent another name change to Pix Theater. Currently it has 226 seat Mainstage, 176 Studio Theater, Coffee house and Lounge. The building is located across the Polish Triangle in the area once called Polish Downtown

In 1990 the ruined theater, located then in one of the most dangerous parts of Chicago, was purchased by the Dyrkacz family and began operations as At the Gallery Theater presenting also Visual Arts. After separation in 1992, the theater was managed by Zygmunt Dyrkacz. In 1994, the name was changed back to Chopin Theatre. In 2001, Zygmunt was joined in the endeavor by Lela Headd. In 2018 the theater became a not for profit organization.

From 1990 to 2024, Chopin Theatre has presented or produced over 2,100 different events in theater, literature, music, dance, and film simultaneously across two stages, sometimes ten per week. Illustrated in roughly a thousand reviews, media features and hundreds of awards and honors available at Chopin Theatre Archives. During this time Chopin Theatre has hosted artists from 49 different countries and has been home to 62 festivals.

== Notable events ==
September 12, 1990: The theatre opened its doors with the multimedia saga “American Way” about the assimilation of Polish immigrants. Directed by Thomas Masters with choreography by Shawn Coyle. Done with no restrooms and electricity corded from the next building.

1991: Nicole Dreiske production of George Tabouri’s “Peepshow” directed by Henryk Baranowski received the Jeff Award for Outstanding Ensemble in a Play.

Chopin Theater becomes, for the next 19 years, theater headquarters for Around the Coyote Arts Festival presenting 10 short plays daily. The fest contributed to Wicker Park becoming one of the hippest neighborhoods in the U.S. and attracted 100,000 people to Wicker Park.

- New Crime Productions presents Hunter S. Thompson’s “Fear and Loathing in Las Vegas” directed by John Cusack and Steve Pink starring Jeremy Piven, Bill Cusack and Paul Quinn.

1992 "Body Politic makes a slick comeback with 'Fashion' - Richard Christiansen

late 1993-1997 Financial and parenting needs led renting most of theater to Chicago Filmmakers for workshops and weekly screenings including annual International Gay & Lesbian film festival

1994 debut of Trap Door theater with Stanislaw Witkacy’s “Madman and the Nun”

- Critic’s Choice for the US debut of “Zielnik” by Scena Plastyczna KUL directed by Leszek Madzik and produced by Chopin Theatre. The performance, “Wilgoc” was also presented.

2000: The television series *Early Edition* used Chopin Theatre extensively to tape “The Play’s the Thing,” in which the main character, Gary, saves an actress from a falling light during a theater rehearsal. See the website for the video.

2023: Sweeney Todd, the Musical by Kokandy Productions was nominated for 16 Non-Equity Jefferson Awards and received 6 including: Best Production, Best Director, Actor in Principal Role, Actress in Principal Role, Supporting Performer and Musical Direction.—Teatro Vista’s The Dream King received 10 Equity Jefferson Award nominations and received 8: Best Production, New Work, Performer in Principal role, Scenic Design, Sound Design, Lighting Design, Original Music and Artistic Specialization

== Awards ==
In 2005 PerformInk included Zygmunt Dyrkacz in "People Making a Difference in Theater” for his contributions to the theatre. Later that year, the production of La Luna by Teatr Cogitatur at Chopin Theatre received the theatre's third consecutive Best of the Year Theater recognition, following Four Dreams of Holderlein and Aztec Hotel in previous years.

In 2010 Chopin Theatre was included in a list of Chicago venues described as “Chicago Venues that Matters the Most” alongside institutions, including Art Institute of Chicago, Civic Opera House, Steppenwolf Theater and Pritzker Pavilion. During the 2012 NATO Summit in Chicago, Dyrkacz received a Polish State Decoration for Promotion of Polish Culture from President Bronyslaw Komorowski.

In 2022, the Chopin Theatre was ranked among Chicago's best theatre venues in reader's survey. In 2024, Chopin Theatre was recognised as “Best Storefront Theater Incubator“, with thу publication highlighting the role of the theater in presenting adventurous and independent stage productions.

== Special guests ==
- Edward Auer, International Chopin Piano Competition pianist
- Henryk Baranowski, Golden Mask award-winning theater and television director and designer
- Patricia Barber, songwriter, composer, pianist
- Brian Sidney Bembridge, scenic, lighting and costume designer
- Gwendolyn Brooks, Pulitzer Prize winning poet
- Peter Brötzmann, free jazz saxophonist and clarinetist
- Mircea Cărtărescu, poet
- Clare Cavanagh, literary critic and translator. Chair Dept Slavic Languages and Literature, Northwestern University
- David Cromer, MacArthur Fellows Program/"Genius Grant", director
- John Cusack, actor and film producer
- Chuck D, rapper and author
- Urszula Dudziak, jazz vocalist
- Stuart Dybek, MacArthur Fellows Program/"Genius Grant", author
- Michael Eric Dyson, academic, author and radio host
- Kurt Elling, jazz vocalist
- Kahil El'Zabar, jazz multi-instrumentalist
- Slawomir Fabicki, film director and screenwriter
- Nils Frahm, musician and composer
- Von Freeman, jazz tenor saxophonist
- Nikki Giovanni, award-winning poet, "living legend"
- Sean Gunn, actor
- Fareed Haque, fusion guitar virtuoso
- Joy Harjo, 23rd U.S Poet Laureate, playwright
- Aleksander Hemon, MacArthur Fellows Program/"Genius Grant", author
- Ryszard Horowitz, photographer
- Steve James, filmmaker, "Hoop Dreams"
- Malalai Joya, activist, writer, former Afghan politician
- Rick Kogan, newspaperman and radio personality
- Yusef Komunyakaa, Pulitzer Prize winning poet
- Greg Kot, music journalist
- Krzysztof Krauze, film director, cinematographer
- Li-Young Lee, poet
- Philip Levine, Pulitzer Prize poet
- Haki Madhubuti, author
- Adam Makowicz, pianist and composer
- Rob Mazurek, cornetist and composer
- Aaron McGruder, author, cartoonist, creator The Boondocks
- Dominic Miller, guitarist (with Sting, Phil Collins)
- Sara Paretsky, author
- Ed Paschke, painter
- William Petersen, actor
- Jeremy Piven, actor and film producer
- Luis J. Rodriguez, poet
- Art Shay, photographer
- Michael Shannon, Pulitzer Prize winning poet
- Charles Simic, Pulitzer Prize winning poet
- Marc Smith, founder poetry slam movement
- Zadie Smith, author of one of Time magazine's 100 best novels
- Franciszek Starowieyski, visual artist
- Studs Terkel, Pulitzer Prize winning author
- Ken Vandermark, MacArthur Fellows Program/"Genius Grant", musician and composer
- Paul Wertico, Grammy Award winner, drummer
- Bronisław Wildstein, journalist
- Adam Zagajewski, poet
- Howard Zinn, historian, author and activist
