= Division Street Russian and Turkish Baths =

Bathhouse in Chicago

Coordinates: 41.9035°N 87.6755°W

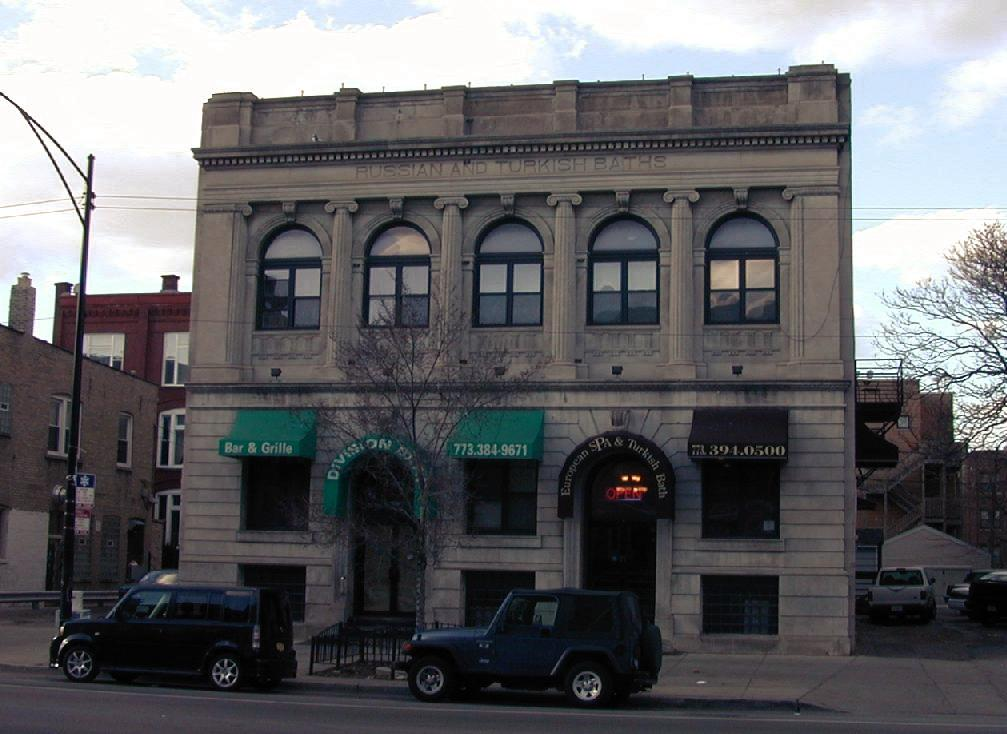
Division Bath, Chicago. Original men's entrance at left, women's at right.

Division Street Russian and Turkish Baths / Red Square is a traditional Russian-style bathhouse at 1914 W. Division Street in the Wicker Park neighborhood of Chicago, Illinois, which closed in 2010 and reopened in 2011 under the name Red Square, offering separate facilities for both men and women, with some mixed gender areas as well. It has operated since 1906.

The most popular feature at Division Bath is the traditional Russian Banya or hot room. These rooms (one on either side) were built of concrete and tile with glass doors. In a corner of each is a brick oven in which granite boulders, approximately the size of watermelons, are heated to extreme temperatures by gas jets; hot water is then thrown on the rocks by the customers as desired. When this happens, the water instantly evaporates, creating steam inside the oven and heating the brick enclosure, thereby raising the air temperature in the room. This method provides a much drier heat than common steam rooms. The bathers would sit or lie on three-level tiered wooden benches, which allow for dramatically different temperatures at the various heights. Cold water is provided by taps located under the benches - when overwhelmed by the heat, a bather will dump a bucket of frigid water over their head while still in the hot room, or may step outside to use the cold pools.

Division Bath is the only traditional bathhouse remaining in Chicago, and one of only a handful in the United States. Authors who have written about it include Nelson Algren and Saul Bellow.

One of its most prominent regular customers was Reverend Jesse Jackson, a fact that brought the bathhouse some publicity when it was first reported in the mainstream press. Mobster Sam Giancana was also said to have gone, and various out-of-town celebrities such as James Gandolfini and Russell Crowe had occasionally visited; their autographed portraits lined a corridor on the first floor.
