= City on the Make =

City on the Make may refer to:

- An episode in the fourth season of Ozark (TV series)
- Chicago: City on the Make
