= Nonconformity =

Nonconformity or nonconformism may refer to:

== Culture and society ==
- Conformity, a matching of attitudes, beliefs, and behaviors to group norms and political views
- Insubordination, the act of willfully disobeying an order of one's superior
- Dissent, a sentiment or philosophy of non-agreement or opposition to a prevailing idea or entity
  - Organizational dissent, the expression of disagreement or contradictory opinions about organizational practices and policies
- Dissenter, one who disagrees in matters of opinion, belief, etc. Disagreeing with or actively pursuing opposition to the dominant states, political party or religions and their consensus.
- Counterculture, a subculture whose values and norms of behavior differ substantially from those of mainstream society, often in direct opposition
  - Bohemianism, the practice of an unconventional lifestyle, often in the company of like-minded people and with few permanent ties
  - Non-conformists of the 1930s, an avantgarde movement during the inter-war period in France
  - Counterculture of the 1960s
- Civil disobedience, the active, professed refusal of a citizen to comply with certain laws, demands, or commands of a government

== Christianity ==
- Nonconformist (Protestantism), Protestants who do not adhere to their country's state church
- Nonconformity to the world, a Christian principle important especially among Anabaptist groups

== Other ==
- Nonconformity (quality), a term in quality management
- A type of unconformity in geology
- Nonconformity (Nelson Algren book), a 1950s essay published in 1996
- Nonconformist, a noctuid moth of the species Lithophane lamda

== See also ==
- Anti-establishment
