= The Man with the Golden Arm =

1955 film by Otto Preminger

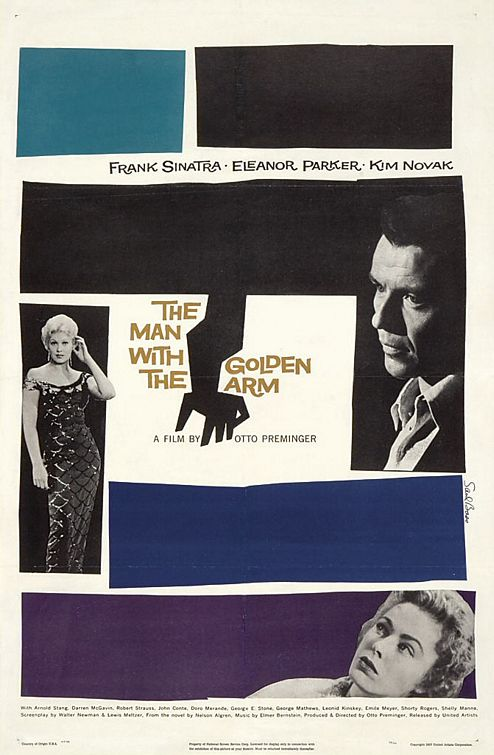
- Theatrical release poster by Saul Bass
- Directed by: Otto Preminger
- Screenplay by: Walter Newman; Lewis Meltzer; Ben Hecht (uncredited)
- Based on: The Man with the Golden Arm; 1949 novel by Nelson Algren
- Produced by: Otto Preminger
- Starring: Frank Sinatra; Eleanor Parker; Kim Novak; Arnold Stang; Darren McGavin
- Cinematography: Sam Leavitt
- Edited by: Louis R. Loeffler
- Music by: Elmer Bernstein
- Production company: Carlyle Productions
- Distributed by: United Artists
- Release date: December 15, 1955
- Running time: 119 minutes
- Country: United States
- Language: English
- Budget: $1 million
- Box office: $4.3 million (US)

The Man with the Golden Arm is a 1955 American independent drama film noir directed by Otto Preminger, based on the novel of the same name by Nelson Algren. Starring Frank Sinatra, Eleanor Parker, Kim Novak, Arnold Stang and Darren McGavin, it recounts the story of a drug addict who gets clean while in prison, but struggles to stay that way in the outside world. Although the addictive drug is never identified in the film, according to the American Film Institute "most contemporary and modern sources assume that it is heroin", although in Algren's book it is morphine. The film's initial release was controversial for its treatment of the then-taboo subject of drug addiction.

It was nominated for three Academy Awards: Sinatra for Best Actor in a Leading Role, Joseph C. Wright and Darrell Silvera for Best Art Direction-Set Decoration, Black-and-White and Elmer Bernstein for Best Music, Scoring of a Dramatic or Comedy Picture. Sinatra was also nominated for best actor awards by the BAFTAs and The New York Film Critics. The film is in the public domain, because its copyright was not renewed. In 2020, the film was selected for preservation in the National Film Registry by the Library of Congress as being "culturally, historically, or aesthetically significant".

== Plot ==
Frankie Machine is released from the federal Narcotic Farm in Lexington, Kentucky, and returns to his run-down neighborhood on the North Side of Chicago. A drug addict (the drug is never named, but heroin is strongly implied), Frankie became clean in rehab for 6 months. On the outside, he greets friends and acquaintances. Sparrow, who runs a con selling homeless dogs, clings to him like a younger brother, but Schwiefka, for whom Frankie used to deal in his illegal card game, has more sinister reasons for welcoming him back, as does Louie, Machine's former drug dealer.

Frankie returns home to his wife, Zosh, who supposedly needs to use a wheelchair after a car crash years earlier that was caused by Frankie driving drunk. Zosh is secretly recovered but pretends to be unable to walk to guilt Frankie into staying with her. He thinks he has what it takes to play drums for a big band. While calling to make an appointment, he bumps into an old flame, Molly, who works in a strip joint as a hostess and lives in the apartment below Frankie's. Unlike Zosh, Molly encourages his dream of becoming a drummer.

Frankie soon gets an audition and asks Sparrow to get him a new suit, but the suit is a stolen one and he ends up in a cell at a local Chicago police precinct. Schwiefka offers to pay the bail if Frankie deals cards for him again. Frankie refuses at first because he thinks that Schwiefka told the police that the suit is stolen, and he does not want to deal anymore, fearing the atmosphere may lead him to relapse. But he soon changes his mind, based on his desire to land an audition.

Soon Frankie succumbs and is back on drugs and dealing marathon all-night card games for Schwiefka. He gets a tryout as a drummer but spends 24 hours straight playing a poker game, during which he is discovered cheating and beaten up. At the audition, with withdrawal coming on, Frankie cannot keep the beat and ruins his chance of landing the job. When Louie goes to see Zosh to try to find Frankie, he discovers that she has been faking her paralysis. Zosh, scared of being found out, pushes Louie over the stairwell railing to his death, but Frankie is sought for the murder.

Frankie goes to Molly hoping to get money for a fix. After learning that Captain Bednar and the police are looking for him, Molly convinces him that he must go cold turkey if he is to stand a chance with the police. Frankie agrees and is locked in Molly's apartment where he goes through a grueling withdrawal to clear the drugs from his body. Finally clean again, he goes to tell Zosh he is going to leave her, start anew, and stand trial. In her desperation to keep Frankie from leaving her, Zosh gives herself away, standing up in front of Frankie and the police. She runs but gets no farther than the outside balcony. Trapped, she throws herself off the balcony to her death. A police ambulance arrives to remove Zosh's lifeless body and drives away, while Frankie watches in dismay. He walks off, with Molly following as Sparrow goes in the opposite direction.

== Cast ==
- Frank Sinatra as Frankie Machine aka "The Man with the Golden Arm"
- Eleanor Parker as Sophia "Zosh" Machine
- Kim Novak as Molly Novotny
- Arnold Stang as Sparrow
- Darren McGavin as "Nifty Louie" Fomorowski
- Robert Strauss as Zero Schwiefka
- John Conte as Drunkie John
- Doro Merande as Vi
- George E. Stone as Sam Markette
- George Mathews as Williams
- Leonid Kinskey as Dominowski
- Emile Meyer as Captain Bednar
- Shorty Rogers as himself (bandleader at audition)
- Ralph Peña as himself (bassist at audition)
- Shelly Manne as himself (drummer at audition)

== Differences from the novel ==
After replacing novel author and original screenwriter Nelson Algren with Walter Newman, Preminger proceeded to change the plot and characters extensively from the original novel, which led to feelings of bitterness from Algren. When photographer and friend Art Shay asked Algren to pose below the film's marquee, he is reported to have said, "What does that movie have to do with me?"

Even though the first draft of the novel did not even deal with drug addiction (it was only added later), this became the singular focus of the film. In the novel, Frankie served in World War II and became addicted to morphine following treatment for a war injury. There is little mention of Frankie's film counterpart serving in the war, and he tells Molly that he started drugs "for kicks."

In Algren's novel, Frankie is a blond-haired man in his late 20s, and as a poor veteran he often wears a torn Army jacket and brogans. Played by Sinatra (who was nearly 40 years old at the time), the film's protagonist has dark hair and normally wears slacks and a dress shirt. In the film he is given a drum set and almost lands a job as a big band drummer, but in the novel he only has a practice pad, and his dream of being a drummer is only a fleeting aspiration.

The novel implies that Zosh's paralysis is a psychosomatic symptom of her mental illness, but in the film she is deliberately deceiving Frankie and is fully able to walk.

The novel's version of Violet ("Vi") is an attractive young woman and Sparrow's love interest. In the film, she is played by Doro Merande, who was in her 60s at the time. The movie combines the character of her spouse, "Old Husband" Koskozka, with that of the landlord, "Jailer" Schwabatski.

Frankie's employer, Schwiefka, is a relatively neutral character in the novel, but in the film he is a villain and Nifty Louie's partner.

In the novel, Frankie inadvertently kills Nifty Louie during a fight, while in the film, a walking Zosh pushes Louie to his death.

Algren's novel ends with a cornered and hopeless Frankie committing suicide, but in the film Zosh is the one who dies, while Sinatra's Frankie and Novak's Molly survive the end of the film together.

In April 1956, Preminger and others were sued by Algren, who was seeking an injunction to keep him from claiming ownership of the property as "An Otto Preminger Film". Algren's suit said the original agreement in 1949 for the film rights had promised him a percentage of the gross for the screen rights. However, he had to drop the suit because he could not afford the legal fees.

== Production ==
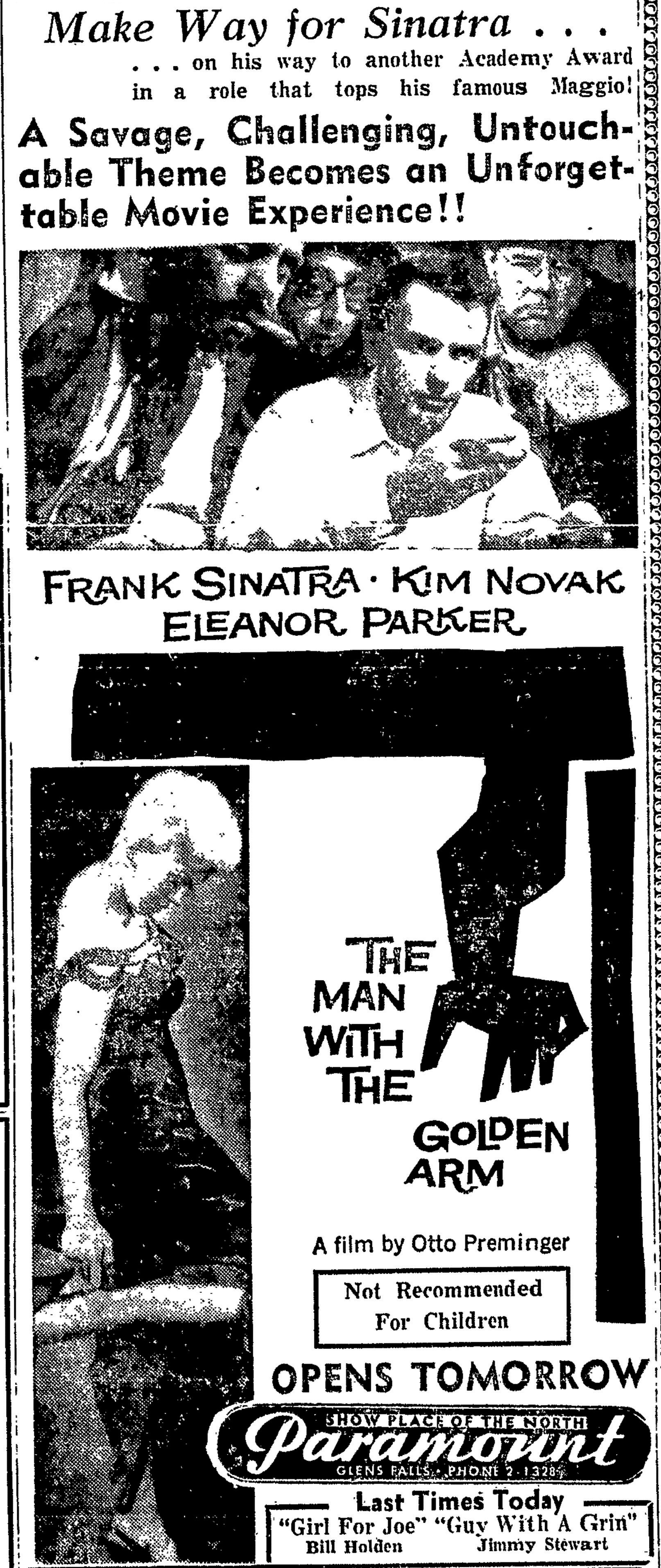
Theatre advertisement, February 17, 1956

Screen rights to Algren's novel were first acquired in 1949 on behalf of John Garfield, who planned to star in the film version. However, production was delayed because the Production Code Administration (PCA) refused to approve the script, with Joseph Breen stating that the basic story was "unacceptable" because of the Code's prohibition on showing illegal drug trafficking and drug addiction. The ability to obtain PCA approval was critical because at that time, many movie theaters would not show films that had not received approval. The PCA further predicted that the subject would also be unacceptable to the National Legion of Decency (a Catholic film censor board), Federal authorities, and state and local censor boards in the United States and abroad. Garfield died in 1952 and the film rights were acquired by Otto Preminger from his estate.

Preminger had previously released The Moon Is Blue (1953), which succeeded at the box office despite being denied the Production Code seal of approval due to its sexual subject matter. He told Peter Bogdanovich why he was attracted to Algren's novel: "I think there's a great tragedy in any human being who gets hooked on something, whether it's heroin or love or a woman or whatever." Although United Artists (UA) had a distribution contract with Preminger, a clause in the contract allowed them to withdraw if a film failed to get Code approval. Preminger stated that in that event, he would set up his own company to handle distribution of The Man with the Golden Arm. Preminger continued to have problems with the PCA during the making of the film.

Although the novel's author, Nelson Algren, was initially brought to Hollywood to work on the screenplay, he and Preminger were incompatible from the start and the situation did not improve. Algren was quickly replaced by Walter Newman. Preminger and Newman made significant changes to Algren's original story,

Frank Sinatra jumped at a chance to star in the film before reading the entire script. The script was given to Marlon Brando around the same time as Sinatra, who still harbored some anger at Brando for beating out Sinatra for the lead role in On the Waterfront. To prepare for his role, Sinatra spent time at drug rehabilitation clinics observing addicts going cold turkey. He also learned to play drums from drummer Shelly Manne. The picture was shot in six weeks at RKO Studios in Hollywood from September 26 through November 4, 1955.

Saul Bass designed the crooked arm symbol used in the film's advertising campaign, which Preminger liked so much that he threatened to pull the picture if an exhibitor changed the advertisements. Bass also created the animated title sequence for the film, the first of many such sequences that he created for films by Preminger, Alfred Hitchcock, and others.

== Musical score and soundtrack ==
The Man with the Golden Arm

Soundtrack album by Elmer Bernstein
- Released: Mid February 1956
- Recorded: September & December, 1955; Hollywood, CA
- Genre: Film score
- Length: 45:22
- Labels: Decca; DL 8257

Elmer Bernstein chronology
The Eternal Sea (1955)	The Man with the Golden Arm (1956)	The Ten Commandments (1956)

Professional ratings
Review scores
Source	Rating
Allmusic	4.5/5 stars

The film score was composed, arranged and conducted by Elmer Bernstein, and the soundtrack album was released on the Decca label in February 1956. Allmusic's Bradley Torreano called it "one of the finest jazz soundtracks to come out of the '50s" and said that "on its own it still shines as an excellent example of how good film music can get. Bernstein's control over the smallest details of the music is what gives it the energy it contains; his blustery horns and deep percussion are only the front while some gorgeous orchestration happens almost unnoticed behind the music."

The title theme was recorded by many other musicians including Billy May & His Orchestra who had a #9 hit in the UK in May 1956; Jet Harris, who released it as a single in 1962, Glam rockers Sweet covered the theme on their album Desolation Boulevard (Europe LP only), and Barry Adamson, who released a version on his album Moss Side Story (1988). A vocal version of the theme called "Delilah Jones", with lyrics by Sylvia Fine unrelated to the subject matter of the film, was released by the McGuire Sisters on Coral Records in 1956.

A vocal version of Bernstein's composition "Molly" with lyrics by Fine, entitled "Molly-O", was also recorded by a number of artists, including The Gaylords, Dick Jacobs and his orchestra, and others.

An alternate theme song, "The Man With the Golden Arm", was composed by Sammy Cahn and Jimmy Van Heusen, and recorded by Sinatra backed by Nelson Riddle's orchestra. However, the song was ultimately not used in the film and did not appear on the soundtrack album. Although Sinatra's recording appeared on some bootleg albums, it remained officially unreleased until 2002, when it was included in the box set Frank Sinatra in Hollywood 1940–1964. Sammy Davis Jr. also recorded a version of the Cahn/ Van Heusen theme, which was released on Decca in 1955.

=== Track listing ===
All compositions by Elmer Bernstein

1. "Clark Street: (a) The Top; (b) Homecoming; (c) Antek's" - 4:58
2. "Zosh" - 4:28
3. "Frankie Machine" - 4:57
4. "The Fix" - 3:30
5. "Molly" - 4:53
6. "Breakup: (a) Flight; (b) Louie's; (c) Burlesque" - 3:42
7. "Sunday Morning" - 2:49
8. "Desperation" - 2:47
9. "Audition" - 2:42
10. "The Cure: (a) Withdraw; (b) Cold; (c) Morning" - 5:57
11. "Finale" - 4:13

=== Personnel ===
Orchestra conducted by Elmer Bernstein featuring:

- Shorty Rogers - flugelhorn
- Conte Candoli, Pete Candoli, Buddy Childers, Bob Fleming, Ray Linn, Cecil Read, Maynard Ferguson, - trumpet
- Albert Anderson, Harry Betts, Milt Bernhart, Jimmy Henderson, George Roberts, Frank Rosolino, Ray Sims - trombone
- Joe Eger, Arthur Frantz, Dick Perissi- French horn
- Martin Ruderman, Sylvia Ruderman - flute
- Nick Fera, Mitchell Lurie - clarinet
- Jerome Kasper, Bud Shank - alto saxophone
- Bob Cooper, Bill Holman, Jack Montrose - tenor saxophone
- Jimmy Giuffre - baritone saxophone
- Arnold Koblenz - oboe
- Fowler Friedlander, Jack Marsh - bassoon
- Sam Rice - tuba
- Israel Baker, Anatol Kaminsky - violin
- Philip Goldberg, Milton Thomas - viola
- Armand Kaproff – cello
- Chauncey Haines - novachord
- Pete Jolly, Lou Levy, Ray Turner - piano
- Abe Luboff, Ralph Peña - bass
- Shelly Manne - drums
- Milt Holland, Lee Previn - percussion
- Fred Steiner - orchestration

== Release ==
=== Controversy over release ===
Preminger decided to release the finished film prior to submitting it for a Code seal of approval. He contended that his film would not entice any viewers to take drugs, since drug use was depicted as having severely negative consequences. United Artists, which had invested $1 million in the film's production, opted to distribute the film, even though doing so could result in the company being fined $25,000 by the Motion Picture Association of America (MPAA). The president of United Artists, Arthur Krim, expressed the company's hope that the PCA would make an exception to its usual rules and grant the film approval because of the film's "immense potential for public service." The film received several advance bookings in November and early December 1955, before the PCA had made a decision on whether to grant a Code seal.

However, in early December 1955, the PCA denied the film a Code seal, and the decision was upheld upon appeal to the MPAA. As a result, United Artists resigned from the MPAA that same month (although the company re-joined a few years later). The National Legion of Decency also showed disagreement with the PCA ruling by rating the film as a "B" meaning "morally objectionable in part for all", instead of a "C" meaning "condemned", which was the rating normally given to films that were denied a Code seal. Large theater circuits including Loews also refused to ban the film and instead showed it despite the lack of a Code seal. As a result of the controversy, the MPAA investigated and revised production codes, allowing later movies more freedom to deeply explore hitherto taboo subjects such as drug abuse, kidnapping, miscegenation, abortion, and prostitution.

In the end, The Man with the Golden Arm finally received the Production Code seal number 20011 in June 1961, which permitted the film to be reissued and sold for television broadcast. The ABC television network aired the film uncut in 1967.

=== Reception ===
The Man with the Golden Arm earned $4,100,000 at the North American box office and the critical reception was just as strong; Variety magazine stated: "Otto Preminger's The Man with the Golden Arm is a feature that focuses on addiction to narcotics. Clinical in its probing of the agonies, this is a gripping, fascinating film, expertly produced and directed and performed with marked conviction by Frank Sinatra as the drug slave."

For The New York Times, Bosley Crowther wrote: "[the film] is nothing more than a long, tortuous picture of one man's battle to beat a craving for dope. And there is nothing more bold or shocking in it than a few shots of this guy writhing on the floor....there is nothing very surprising or exciting about 'The Man With the Golden Arm.' 'The Lost Weekend' was much more arresting and shocking in its study of a drunkard....Mr. Sinatra gives a plausible performance....But the others in the cast are less effective. Eleanor Parker...is the least. She looks and talks like a well-bred, well-kept lady--living in a slum. Mr. Preminger weakened his film immensely by not having her a realistic drab. Kim Novak makes a strangely pallid figure...and Darren McGavin is a stock oily villain....Arnold Stang...Robert Strauss...and John Conte...are standard types from gangster films."

On Rotten Tomatoes, the film holds an approval rating of 81% from 58 reviews. The website's critics consensus reads, "The Man with the Golden Arm is a difficult watch, but it's held together by Frank Sinatra's impressively committed work in the title role."

=== Preservation ===
The Academy Film Archive preserved The Man with the Golden Arm in 2005. In 2020, the film was selected for preservation in the National Film Registry by the Library of Congress as being "culturally, historically, or aesthetically significant".

== See also ==
- List of American films of 1955
- Message picture
