= The Neon Wilderness =

1947 short story collection by Nelson Algren

- First edition
- Author: Nelson Algren
- Language: English
- Genre: Short stories: tragi-comedy, satire
- Publisher: Doubleday & Co.
- Publication date: 1947
- Publication place: United States
- Media type: Print (hardcover)
- Pages: 286 (1st ed.)
- OCLC: 1117160
- Dewey Decimal: 813.52

The Neon Wilderness (1947) is the first short-story collection by American writer Nelson Algren. Two of its stories had received an O. Henry Award. Algren received an award from the American Academy of Arts and Letters the same year.

== Overview ==
The book collects 24 stories: 8 previously published (from 1933 to 1947) and 16 new. Most of them are set in then-contemporary Chicago (1930s and 1940s), in the so-called "Polish-American ghetto". They revolve around the lower classes: workers and unemployed, drunkards and gamblers, prostitutes and hustlers, small-businessmen and policemen. Unlike Dickens or Zola, their general tone is tragi-comedy or sympathetic satire.

Two stories had received an O. Henry Award (and been reprinted in the related annual volume): Algren's second-published story "The Brothers' House" (1935 award) and "A Bottle of Milk for Mother (Biceps)" (1941 award). Two had been selected for The Best American Short Stories: "A Bottle of Milk for Mother" (as "Biceps", 1942 volume) and "How the Devil Came Down Division Street" (1945 volume). The year the collection was released, Algren received an award from the American Academy of Arts and Letters and a grant from Chicago's Newberry Library.

== Contents ==
The collection contains the following 24 stories (with first appearance for the 8 previously published).

1. "The Captain Has Bad Dreams"
2. "How the Devil Came Down Division Street" (1944, Harper's Bazaar)
3. "Is Your Name Joe?"
4. "Depend on Aunt Elly"
5. "Stickman's Laughter" (1942, The Southern Review)
6. "A Bottle of Milk for Mother" (1941, as "Biceps", The Southern Review)
7. "He Couldn't Boogie-Woogie Worth a Damn"
8. "A Lot You Got to Holler"
9. "Poor Man's Pennies"
10. "The Face on the Barroom Floor" (1947, (Note: That first appearance was as "The Face on the Barroom Floor, or Too Much Salt on the Pretzels". (See Contento reference.)) The American Mercury)
11. "The Brothers' House" (1934, Story magazine)
12. "Please Don't Talk About Me When I'm Gone"
13. "He Swung and He Missed" (1942, The American Mercury)
14. "El Presidente de Méjico"
15. "Kingdom City to Cairo"
16. "That's the Way It's Always Been"
17. "The Children" (1943, The American Mercury)
18. "Million-Dollar Brainstorm"
19. "Pero Vencermos"
20. "No Man's Laughter"
21. "Katz"
22. "Design for Departure"
23. "The Heroes"
24. "So Help Me" (1933, Story magazine)
