= Walk on the Wild Side (film) =

1962 film by Edward Dmytryk

- Theatrical release poster inspired by Saul Bass's opening title sequence
- Directed by: Edward Dmytryk
- Screenplay by: John Fante; Edmund Morris; Ben Hecht (uncredited)
- Based on: A Walk on the Wild Side by Nelson Algren
- Produced by: Charles K. Feldman
- Starring: Laurence Harvey; Capucine; Jane Fonda; Anne Baxter; Barbara Stanwyck
- Cinematography: Joseph MacDonald
- Edited by: Harry Gerstad
- Music by: Elmer Bernstein
- Distributed by: Columbia Pictures
- Release date: February 21, 1962
- Running time: 114 minutes
- Country: United States
- Language: English
- Budget: $2 million or $4.5 million
- Box office: $3 million (US and Canada rentals)

Walk on the Wild Side is a 1962 American drama film directed by Edward Dmytryk and starring Laurence Harvey, Capucine, Jane Fonda, Anne Baxter and Barbara Stanwyck. The screenplay by John Fante and Edmund Morris is based on the 1956 novel A Walk on the Wild Side by American author Nelson Algren.

While it passed its censors, it was an adult film noir with explicit overtones and subject matter. It walks its audience through the lives and relationships between adults (mostly women) engaged in commercial prostitution at a stylish New Orleans brothel. The brothel is run by Madam Jo Courtney (Stanwyck), who combines toughness with a motherly tenderness toward her "girls". Stanwyck returned to the big screen after a five year hiatus spent mostly on television.

Life wrote "Jane Fonda portrays a grubby, footloose prostitute...just arrived in New Orleans to live in a fancy house where much of the action takes place...to get approval by the Code Authority and Legion of Decency, the movie changes some of the most evil characters into good ones, and at the end justice triumphs, not Jane."

== Plot ==
In the Great Depression, Dove Linkhorn and Kitty Tristram meet on the road in Texas as each travels separately to New Orleans. They decide to travel together, hitchhiking and hopping freight trains. Dove is hoping to find his lost love Hallie Gerard and he is uninterested when Kitty comes on to him. After Kitty steals from the New Orleans-area café where she and Dove stop for a meal, he leaves her and makes things right with the owner Teresina Vidaverri. She gives Dove a job at the café and a place to stay while he searches for Hallie. He finds her working at the Doll House, an upscale French Quarter bordello, where Jo Courtney is the madam.

Later it is revealed that, after Jo's husband Achilles Schmidt lost his legs in an accident, she lost interest in him. A lesbian relationship is suggested between Jo and Hallie, who is supported by Jo in pursuing her interest in sculpting on the side. However, Hallie still works for Jo as a prostitute like the other women. Hallie is unhappy with her life at Jo's but she does not want to give up her comforts to risk married life when Dove proposes.

Meanwhile, Kitty starts working at the bordello after Jo bails her out of jail, where she had been confined for vagrancy. Because Kitty and Dove appear to know each other, Jo questions Kitty about her past and learns that she traveled with Dove from Texas to Louisiana. Jo threatens Dove with arrest for transporting the underage Kitty across state lines for immoral purposes and for statutory rape unless he leaves New Orleans without Hallie. As Dove leaves the bordello, the bouncer, the bartender and Schmidt beat him viciously while Kitty watches from upstairs.

Kitty helps Dove return to the café, where Teresina cares for him. Kitty returns to the bordello to get Hallie, helping her to reach the café. When Hallie cannot be found at the bordello, Kitty is suspected and put under pressure; frightened, she brings Jo and her three henchmen to the café. During the ensuing struggle among the men, Hallie is shot and killed by a stray bullet. On the front-page of a newspaper about Kitty's testimony, Jo and several others are convicted.

== Cast ==
- Laurence Harvey as Dove Linkhorn
- Capucine as Hallie
- Jane Fonda as Kitty Twist
- Anne Baxter as Teresina Vidaverri
- Barbara Stanwyck as Jo Courtney
- Joanna Moore as Miss Precious
- Richard Rust as Oliver
- Karl Swenson as Schmidt
- Don Barry as Dockery
- Juanita Moore as Mama
- John Anderson as Preacher
- Ken Lynch as Frank Bonito

== Production ==
=== Tensions ===
Tensions among the actors and director caused problems on the set. After Laurence Harvey told Capucine she could not act, she sulked for a week. His opinion was seconded by actress Joan Perry, widow of Columbia Pictures studio head Harry Cohn, but the film's producer Charles Feldman continued to promote Capucine, his live-in girlfriend. This incident and others, including Jane Fonda's insistence on changing dialogue, eventually resulted in the director Edward Dmytryk resigning. The film's schedule slipped, causing difficulties for co-star Anne Baxter, six months pregnant when the production wrapped. Baxter described these events in her autobiography Intermission (1976).

=== Filming ===
Although largely filmed in New Orleans, it features scenes from the Thousand Oaks Meat Locker on what is now Thousand Oaks Boulevard in Thousand Oaks, California.

=== Title sequences ===
The opening titles and closing sequence were designed by Saul Bass, probably in collaboration with Elaine Makatura Bass. Film reviewers universally praised the Bass titles, but generally condemned the film. Even director Edward Dmytryk acknowledged that the titles were a masterpiece. The titles feature a black cat, filmed at ground level, prowling an urban landscape and picking a fight with a white cat. Bass stated that the cat's journey was a metaphor for the environment of poverty and despair experienced by the film's characters. At film's end, Bass filmed the same black cat walking over a newspaper headline, with a front-page story reporting that the people who ran the bordello were arrested and sentenced to many years in prison, an ending demanded by the Motion Picture Production Code to appease those offended by the film's subject matter.

== Reception ==
=== Critical reception ===
In 1962, Bosley Crowther of the New York Times wrote: "Everything in this sluggish picture...smacks of sentimentality and social naiveté. It is incredible that anything as foolish would be made in this day and age...There is ever so slight a suggestion that the prostitute portrayed by Capucine is admired by the madam of the bordello, played by Barbara Stanwyck. But that this is any more than the admiration of the employer for a highly productive employee is a thing that only the most susceptible to press-agentry might suspect."

In 2025, FilmInk argued that the film "has splendid music and credits, and isn't as bad as we'd been led to believe, though it is a mess."

=== Accolades ===
The film's title song "Walk on the Wild Side", performed by Brook Benton, was nominated for an Academy Award for Best Original Song at the 35th Academy Awards. Composer Elmer Bernstein and lyricist Mack David shared the nomination.
