= Nonconformity (book) =

Essay by Nelson Algren

- Author: Nelson Algren
- Language: English
- Genre: Non-fiction
- Publisher: Seven Stories Press
- Publication date: 1996
- Publication place: United States

Nonconformity: Writing on Writing is a book-length essay by Nelson Algren, intended for publication in 1953 but released posthumously in 1996 by Seven Stories Press. Kurt Vonnegut called it, "A handbook for tough, truth-telling outsiders who are proud, as was Algren, to damn well stay that way."

== Overview ==
The bulk, written between 1951 and 1953, presents Algren's philosophy as a writer, especially in the context of McCarthyism. The book was demanded by and given in June 1953 to his then-publisher Doubleday, but possibly due to the pressure of the FBI's then-ongoing investigation of Algren, Doubleday rejected it in September. Algren then sent it to his agent, but the manuscript was either lost in the mail or intercepted by the FBI, and the text salvaged from a carbon copy. In 1956, Algren gave those carbons to Van Allen Bradley, the Chicago Daily News editor who had commissioned the essay that inspired the book.

Excerpts were published as "Things of the Earth: A Groundhog View" (in The California Quarterly, Autumn 1952) and as "Great Writing Bogged Down in Fear, Says Novelist Algren" (in the Chicago Daily News, December 3, 1952).

Added to the original essay is a memoir on the making of the 1955 film version of his novel The Man with the Golden Arm.
