= Division station (CTA Blue Line) =

Chicago "L" station

Division 1200N 1600W
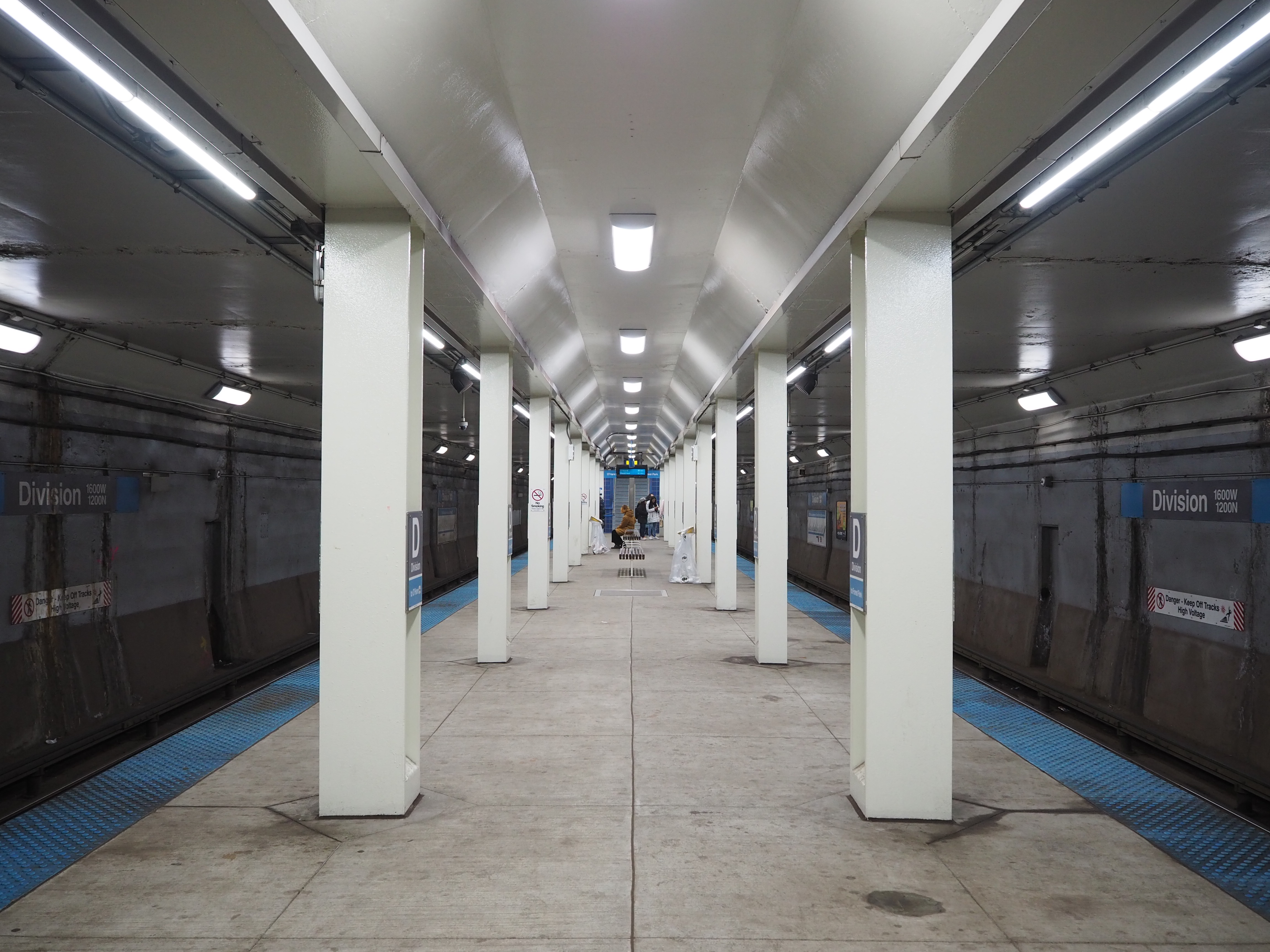

General information
- Location: 1200 North Milwaukee Avenue; Chicago, Illinois 60622, US
- Coordinates: 41°54′12″N 87°39′59″W
- Owner: City of Chicago
- Line: Milwaukee–Dearborn subway
- Platforms: 1 island platform
- Tracks: 2

Construction
- Structure type: Subway
- Depth: 31 feet (9.4 m)
- Cycle facilities: Yes
- Accessible: No

History
- Opened: February 25, 1951; 75 years ago
- Rebuilt: 2019–2020; 6 years ago

Passengers
- 2025: 1,288,958 ▲8%

Services
Preceding station	Chicago "L"	Following station
Damen toward O'Hare	Blue Line	Chicago toward Forest Park
Track layout
Location

Division, (Division/Milwaukee in station announcements) is an 'L' station on the CTA's Blue Line in Chicago, Illinois, United States. The station is located at the Polonia Triangle (the intersection of Milwaukee, Ashland, and Division) and serves the Wicker Park and East Ukrainian Village areas of West Town. From Division, trains take 6 minutes to reach downtown.

== Bus connections ==
CTA

- 9 Ashland (Owl Service)
- X9 Ashland Express (weekday rush hours only)
- 56 Milwaukee
- 70 Division
