= The Mandarins =

1954 novel by Simone de Beauvoir

- Cover art by Laszlo Matulay (U.S. edition)
- Author: Simone de Beauvoir
- Language: French
- Genre: Novel
- Publisher: Gallimard
- Publication date: 1954
- Publication place: Paris
- English publication date: 1956
- Media type: Print Hardback
- Pages: 579 pp.

The Mandarins (French: Les Mandarins) is a 1954 roman à clef by Simone de Beauvoir, for which she won that year's Prix Goncourt, awarded annually to the best and most imaginative prose work. The Mandarins was first published in English in 1956 as a translation by Leonard M. Friedman.

The book follows the personal lives of a close-knit group of French intellectuals from the end of World War II to the mid-1950s. The title refers to the scholar-bureaucrats of imperial China. The characters at times see themselves as ineffectual "mandarins" as they attempt to discern what role, if any, intellectuals will have in influencing the political landscape of the world after World War II. As in Beauvoir's other works, themes of feminism, existentialism, and personal morality are explored as the characters navigate not only the intellectual and political landscape but also their shifting relationships with each other.

The Irish novelist and philosopher Iris Murdoch (in the Sunday Times) described The Mandarins as "a remarkable book, a novel on the grand scale, courageous in its exactitude and endearing because of its persistent seriousness".

== Characters ==
- Henri Perron (considered to be Albert Camus) is the editor of the leftist newspaper L'Espoir. (It was the name of a clandestine newspaper of the French Resistance 1944–1945.) He has been in a relationship with Paula for the past 10 years. Previously in love, he is now unhappily attached. Henri primarily sees himself as a writer and struggles with his increasing involvement in the political arena.
- Robert Dubreuilh (considered to be Jean-Paul Sartre) is the founder and leader of the SRL, a liberal, non-Communist political group. He is partly responsible for Henri's literary success, and the two are close personal friends.
- Anne Dubreuilh (considered to be Beauvoir herself) is the wife of Robert. She is a practicing psychoanalyst. She has an affair with the American writer Lewis Brogan. Her reflections on the lives of the other characters comprise a large portion of the text.
- Paula Mareuil is Henri's girlfriend. She is unrelentingly committed to her relationship with Henri, despite his indifference and, later, loathing and resentment. She develops severe delusions and paranoia regarding this relationship and is forced to seek medical treatment.
- Nadine Dubreuilh is Robert and Anne's daughter. Nadine is haunted by the death of her Jewish boyfriend Diego during the French Resistance. She has an affair with Henri early in the course of the novel and later marries him and has a child by him.
- Lewis Brogan (considered to be Nelson Algren, to whom the book is dedicated) is an American writer with whom Anne has an extended affair.
- Scriassine — David Cesarani in the biography Arthur Koestler: The Homeless Mind, suggests that Scriassine's character is drawn on Arthur Koestler.

In volume 3 of her autobiography, de Beauvoir denies that The Mandarins is a roman à clef. She writes: "I loathe romans à clef as much as I loathe fictionalized biographies." However, she says that "Anne was made from me, true, ... but I have made her into a woman in whom I do not recognize myself." She does admit that "of all my characters, Lewis is the one who approaches closest to a living model.... It so happens that Algren, in his reality, was very representative of what I wanted to represent." Regarding the other characters, she says, "Henri, whatever people have said, is not Camus; not at all. He is young, has dark hair, he runs a newspaper; the resemblance stops there." Furthermore: "[Henri] in his relations with the Communist Party and in his attitude to Socialism, resembles Sartre and Merleau-Ponty, and not Camus in the slightest." And as for Dubreuilh, she writes, "The identification of Sartre with Dubreuilh is no less aberrant; the only similarities between them are their common curiosity, concern with the world and fanaticism in work; but Dubreuilh is twenty years older than Sartre."
