= Division Street (Chicago) =

Street in Chicago, Illinois and west suburbs

- 1200 North
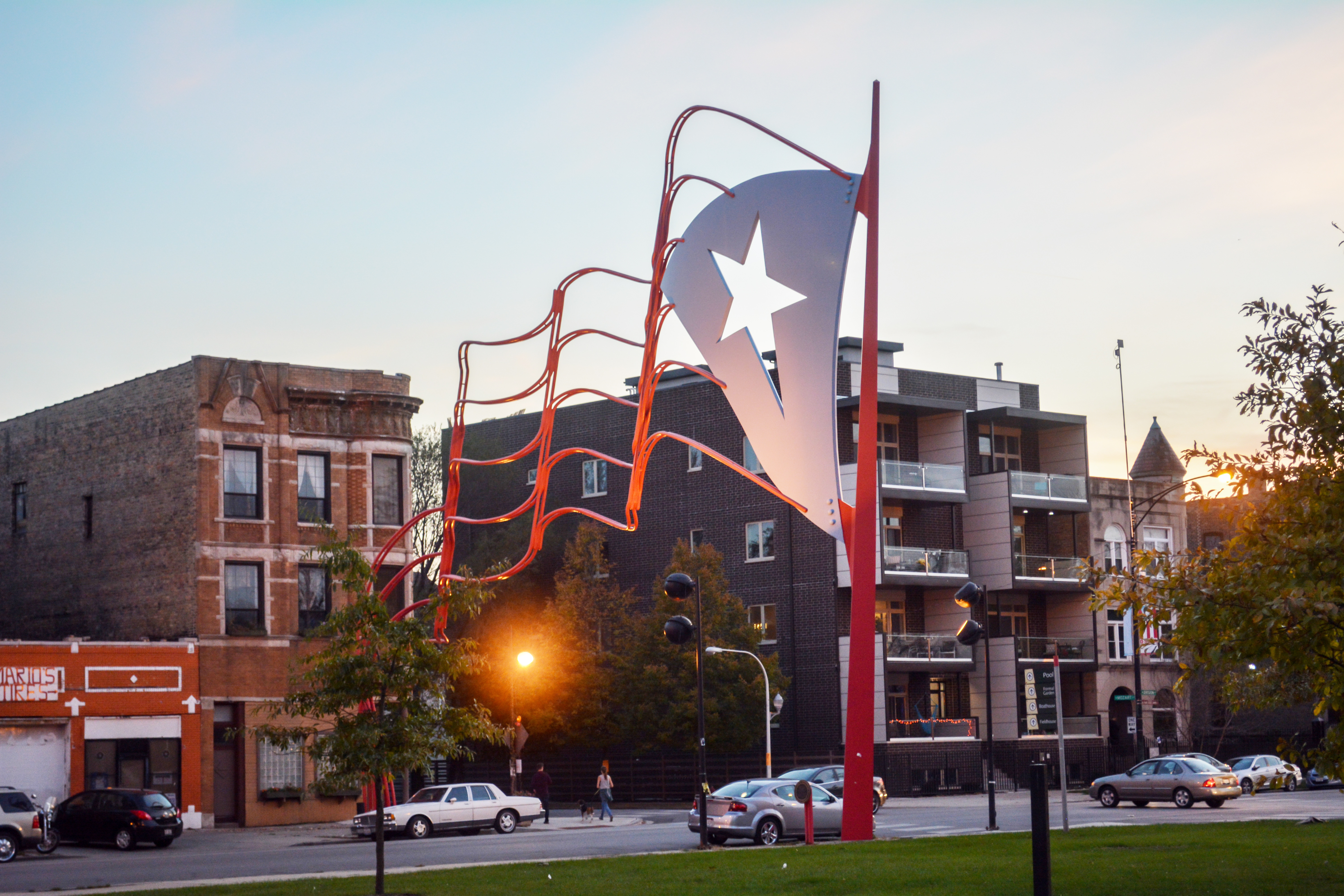
- Division Street (Paseo Boricua) Puerto Rican Flags
- Interactive map of Division Street
- Location: Cook County, Illinois, United States
- East end: US 41 in Near North Side, Chicago
- Major junctions: I-90 / I-94 in West Town, Chicago; Thatcher Avenue in River Forest; 1st Avenue in Melrose Park; 5th Avenue in Melrose Park; Lee Avenue in Melrose Park; Carson Drive in Melrose Park; De Prizio Drive in Melrose Park
- West end: Harold Avenue in Melrose Park

Division Street is a major east-west street in Chicago, Illinois, located at 1200 North (one and a half miles north of Madison Street). Division Street begins in the Gold Coast neighborhood near Lake Shore Drive, passes through Polonia Triangle at Milwaukee Avenue into Wicker Park and continues to Chicago's city limits and into the city's western suburbs. Once known as "Polish Broadway" during the heyday of Polish Downtown, Division Street was the favorite street of author Nelson Algren. A fountain dedicated in his name was installed in what had been the area that figured as the inspiration for much of his work.

Division Street once served as one of Chicago's main and hippest club strips, with bars and clubs lining much of the street from State Street west to Dearborn Street. Today, the street serves as the Near North Side's second major nightlife hub, second only to the upscale River North entertainment district, located north and east of the Chicago River, and west of the famed Michigan Avenue shopping district and south of Chicago Avenue, focusing on Hubbard Street as the epicenter. The Division Street bars and clubs stay open very late, with most closing 4 o'clock or 5 o'clock in the morning. The street is usually very crowded and busy, and after 3 AM, Chicago police usually block off the street to vehicular traffic due to the heavy pedestrian presence. Further to the west, Division serves areas of the city that are not as economically vibrant, including for many years the Cabrini-Green public housing development, continuing a pattern of social class division noted by author Studs Terkel in his book, Division Street: America. Division Street has a Red Line stop at Clark/Division. Division Street is also served by the Division/Milwaukee stop on the Blue Line at Polonia Triangle.

On the north side of this street, two doors to the east of Dearborn Street, is the bar called "Mother's" which gained some prominence as a result of the 1986 film, About Last Night.... The film was based on the 1974 play, Sexual Perversity in Chicago, by David Mamet, which was set in the subculture to be found in the intersecting Rush Street and Division Street bars, at the time. It focused on a group of characters who frequented the bar in question, portraying the corrosive effects of the subculture on relations within

The exterior shots were of the real bar, though the interior shots were done elsewhere. Mother's is located in a basement, with many support pillars through its unusually-shaped space, due to the proximity of the tunnel for the Red Line train and its air intake shafts.

Farther west, around Damen Avenue (2000 W), are a number of upscale restaurants, shops, and bars. This is one of the trendiest strips in the city. These are popular in the gentrifying neighborhoods of Wicker Park, East Village, Ukrainian Village and Pulaski Park. This neighborhood figured prominently in the 1977 film, Looking for Mr. Goodbar.

Paseo Boricua (loosely translated as "Boricua Promenade") is located further west along Division Street between Western Avenue and California Avenue, in the neighborhood of Humboldt Park. The strip is flanked on both sides by 59-foot-tall (18 m) Puerto Rican flags made of steel. Dedicated to Puerto Rican pride, this part of the street includes a "walk of fame", with the names of many outstanding Puerto Ricans. Paseo Boricua is the political and cultural capital of the Puerto Rican community in the Midwest and, some say, in the Puerto Rican Diaspora. In June 2024, the part of the Humboldt Park neighborhood in Chicago known as Puerto Rico Town or Paseo Boricua officially changed its name to Barrio Borikén.

The Horween Leather Company, founded as I. Horween and Co. in 1905, was originally located on Division Street. The company moved in 1927 to North Elston Avenue.

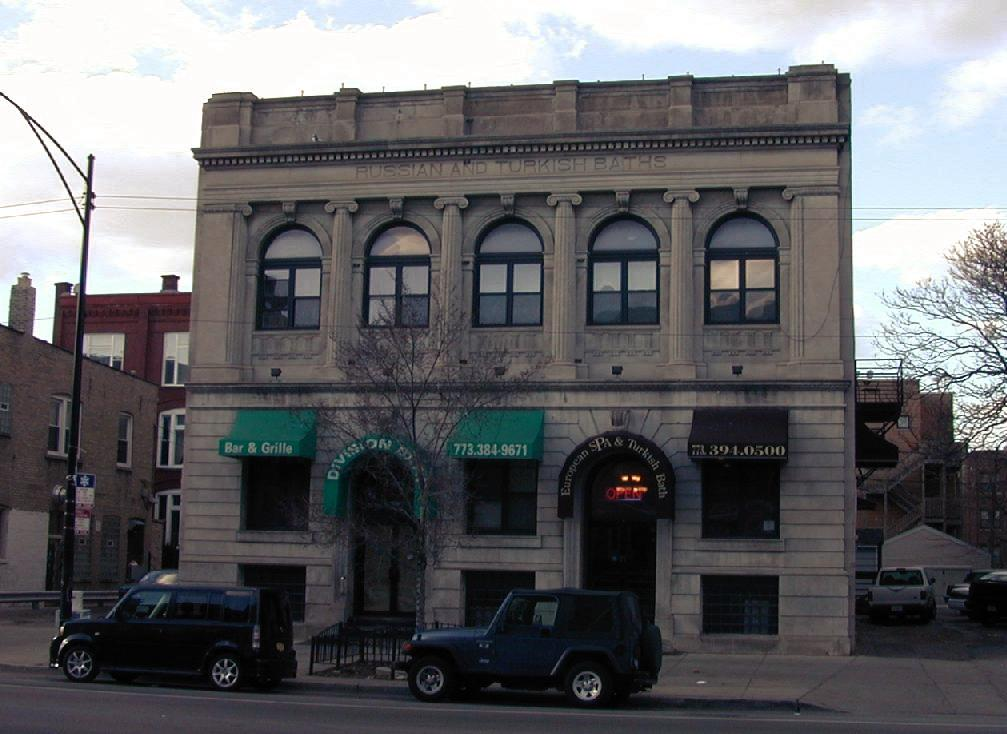
Division Street Russian and Turkish Baths

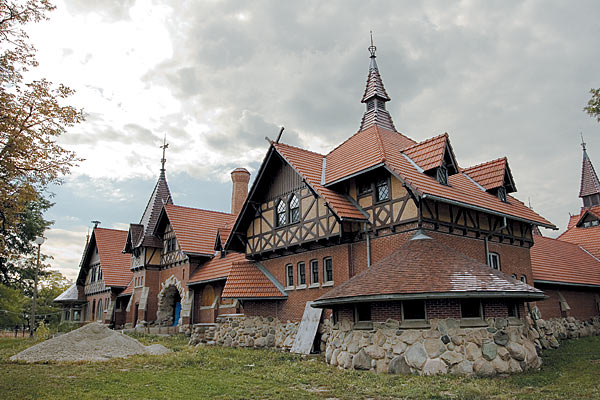
Humboldt Park Stables and Receptory

== Transportation ==
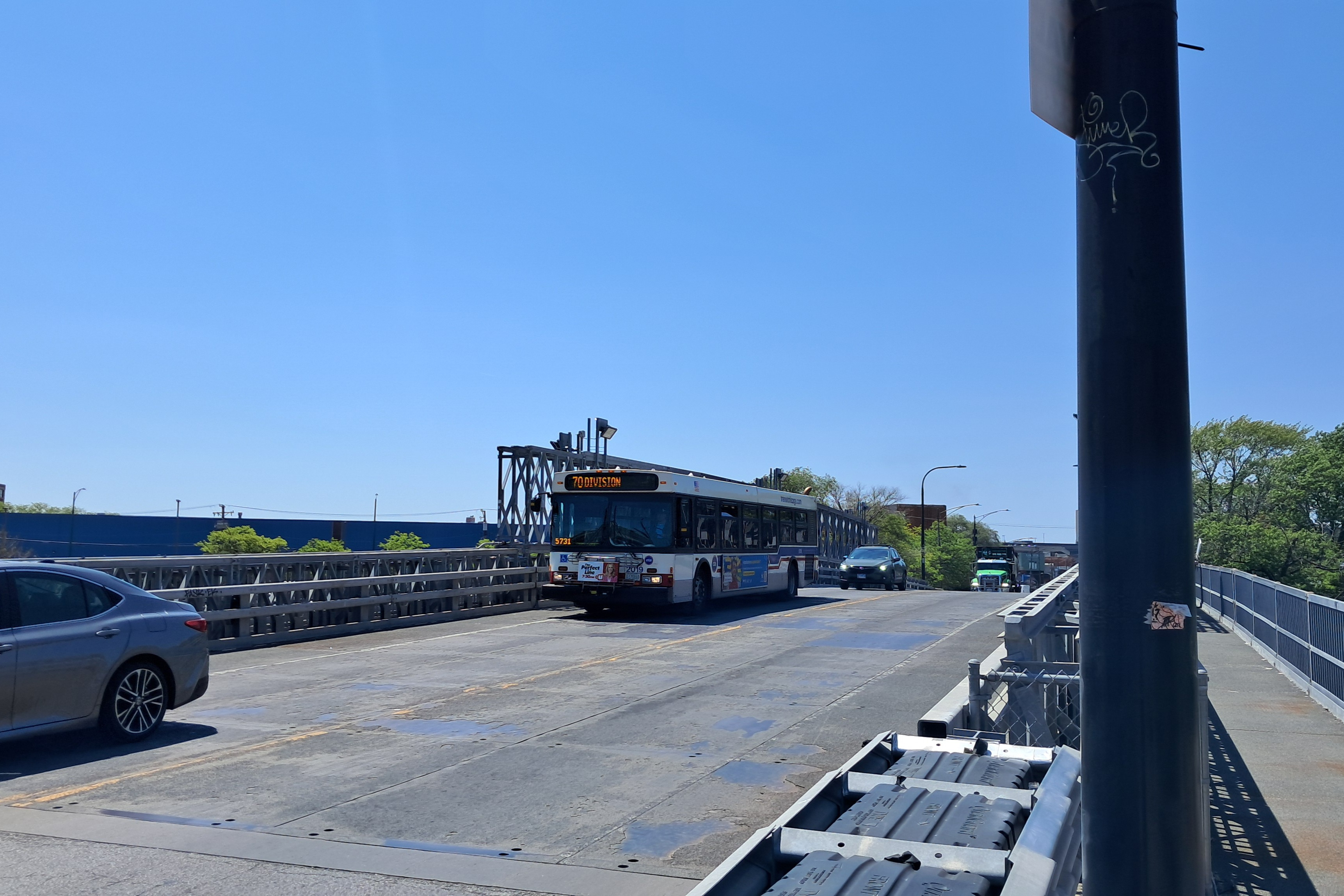
Route 70 bus crossing the North Branch Canal

Division Street is primarily served by the 70 Division bus of the CTA between Austin Boulevard and Dearborn Street. The bus route runs from Austin Boulevard at Division Street to Walton Street between Clark Street and Dearborn Street. The latter terminal is in between the Newberry Library to the north and Washington Square Park to the south.

The Red Line and Blue Line also have a station at Clark Street and Milwaukee Avenue respectively.

== Major intersections ==
The entire route is in Cook County.

Location	mi	km	Destinations	Notes
Chicago	0.0	0.0	US 41 (Lake Shore Drive)	Eastern terminus of Division Street; frontage road only
Chicago	1.8	2.9	I-90 / I-94 (Kennedy Expressway)	
Chicago	6.2	10.0	IL 50 (Cicero Avenue)	
Oak Park–River Forest line	9.3	15.0	IL 43 (Harlem Avenue)	
River Forest	10.3	16.6	Thatcher Avenue	Main segment dead ends here.
Gap in route
Melrose Park	10.6	17.1	IL 171 (1st Avenue)	
Melrose Park	10.95	17.62	5th Avenue	
Melrose Park	Gap in route			
Melrose Park	11.3	18.2	9th Avenue	
Melrose Park	11.7	18.8	19th Avenue (Broadway Avenue)	
Melrose Park	12.3	19.8	25th Avenue	
Gap in route
Stone Park	13.3	21.4	US 45 (Mannheim Road)	
1.000 mi = 1.609 km; 1.000 km = 0.621 mi

== See also ==
- Division Street Russian and Turkish Baths
