= Somebody in Boots =

1935 novel by Nelson Algren

First edition

Somebody in Boots is writer Nelson Algren's first novel, based on his personal experiences of living in Texas during the Great Depression. The novel was published by Vanguard Press in 1935. The title refers to someone with material well-being and authority, as poor folk and the powerless wore shoes or went barefoot. The bosses and police feared by the poor and downtrodden wear boots, which not only symbolize their power and relative affluence, but can be used as weapons against them.

== Plot ==
Cass McKay is a poor illiterate young man set adrift by the Depression. He is a southerner, a "Final Descendant of the South", one of the "wild and hardy tribe that had given Jackson and Lincoln birth... slaveless yeomen who had never cared for slaves or land...."

Cass lives in the Rio Grande Valley in West Texas in a shack "like a casual box on the border; wooden and half-accidental" with his father, his brother (a World War I vet disabled by exposure to poison gas during the war), and sister, subsisting on oatmeal or rice and handouts from the "Relief Station". After a fight between his father and brother, Cass starts drifting, riding the rails from El Paso, Texas to Chicago, with stops in Shreveport, Louisiana and New Orleans. His journey (and the novel) ends in Chicago during the 1933-34 World`s Fair with the intimation that Cass likely will become a career criminal, already having committed a variety of offenses that have landed him in jail twice.

== Autobiographical element ==
The novel is based on Algren's own wanderings through America during the Great Depression. Born in Detroit Michigan and raised in Chicago, Algren graduated from the University of Illinois at Urbana-Champaign with a Bachelor of Science in journalism in 1931. He began traveling throughout the country and wound up in Texas in 1933, where he wrote his first short story while working at a gas station. Intending to return home, he stole a typewriter from a local business college and was imprisoned for theft.

The material in Somebody in Boots would later be reworked into Algren's 1956 novel A Walk on the Wild Side, which also featured a wandering Texan.

Algren typically denigrated his first novel, which he felt was a primitive work. In a preface to a 1987 paperback re-issue published by Thunder's Mouth Press, Algren wrote, `This is an uneven novel written by an uneven man in the most uneven of American times.`` Algren earlier had said that he was glad the book had gone out of print as he felt A Walk on the Wild Side was a superior book.

Somebody in Boots sold only 750 copies. A byproduct of the book was his relationship with Amanda Kontowicz, whom he met at a publication party for his book. The couple married in 1937, divorced, remarried and eventually were divorced a second and final time.

== Native Son & Richard Wright ==
Native Son was the original title Algren gave to the novel, but it was changed in accordance with the wishes of his publisher. Algren and Richard Wright had met at Chicago's John Reed Club circa 1933 and later worked together at the Federal Writers' Project in Chicago. According to Bettina Drew's 1989 biography Nelson Algren: A Life on the Wild Side, he bequeathed the title "Native Son" to Wright.
