= A Walk on the Wild Side =

1956 novel by Nelson Algren

- First edition cover
- Author: Nelson Algren
- Language: English
- Publisher: Farrar, Straus and Cudahy
- Publication date: 1956
- Publication place: United States
- Media type: Print (hardback & paperback)
- Pages: 346 pp. (paperback edition)
- OCLC: 62225900

A Walk on the Wild Side is a 1956 novel by Nelson Algren which was adapted into the 1962 film of the same name. Set in Depression era, it is "the tragi-comedy of Dove Linkhorn", a naive Texan drifting from his hometown to New Orleans.

Algren noted, "The book asks why lost people sometimes develop into greater human beings than those who have never been lost in their whole lives. Why men who have suffered at the hands of other men are the natural believers in humanity, while those whose part has been simply to acquire, to take all and give nothing, are the most contemptuous of mankind."

It is most often quoted for Algren's "three rules of life": "Never play cards with a man called Doc. Never eat at a place called Mom's. Never sleep with a woman whose troubles are worse than your own."

== Plot ==
=== Chapter 1 ===
Fitz Linkhorn barely managed to make a living pumping out cesspools, but his consuming vocation was "Born Again" preaching from the courthouse steps in 1930 Arroyo, Texas; it was a small, mostly Hispanic, and heavily Catholic town in the Rio Grande Valley. Fitz denounced all sins except drinking; because, being a drunk himself, he made sure he was both eloquently, and tastefully drunk as often as possible. He had two sons, Byron, who was weak and sickly, and Dove.

Dove had no education because his father had not wanted to send him to a school with a Catholic principal (And what else could there have been in Arroyo?). Instead, he was supposed to see movies with Byron to learn about life, but Dove never got to go; his brother did not have the price of a ticket. Dove got his education from the hoboes who hung around the Santa Fe tracks, telling one another what towns, lawmen, jails, and railroad bulls (deputized railroad police), to avoid.

Dove began hanging around the La Fe en Dios chili parlor in the ruins of the Hotel Crockett on the other side of town. The hotel was the place where Fitz had met the mother of his boys. The hotel was closed, but the seldom-visited café was run by Terasina Vidavarri, a wary woman traumatized by her marriage, aged sixteen, with a middle-aged ex-soldier who raped her with a swagger stick on their wedding night. She continued Dove's education by teaching him how to read from two books. One of the books was a children's storybook; the other was about how to write business letters. When he was old enough (to enjoy her teaching); Terasina broadened Dove's education, by her and him becoming lovers.

Byron blackmailed Dove into stealing from the café, and Terasina knew that Dove had taken money out of the cash register. She kicked him out, but not before he raped her. Dove then left Arroyo on a freight train in early 1931. Dove took up with a girl named Kitty Twist, a runaway from a children's home, and saved her life when she was about to fall under the wheels of a train. When they attempted a burglary in Houston, Kitty was caught. Dove got away on a freight to New Orleans. One of the first things he saw in New Orleans was a man cutting the heads off turtles that were to be made into turtle soup and throwing the bodies into a pile. Even with the heads cut off, the bodies tried to climb to the top of the pile. One turtle was able to reach the top of the pile before it slid back to the bottom.

"Dove didn't hesitate. 'I'll take the tarpon soup.' He didn't yet know that there was also room for one more at the bottom."

=== Chapter 2 ===
In the port city, with its many different influences and cultures, Dove experienced his most interesting adventures. He worked as a painter on a steamship (but did not paint anything), fooled a prostitute who was trying to rob him, sold coffeepots and "beauty certificates" (which supposedly entitled the bearer to a treatment at a beauty shop) while seducing the women to whom he was selling, and, in his most memorable escapade, worked in a condom factory. The condoms, which were called O-Daddies and bore interesting names and colors, were made in a house by a mom-and-pop firm, Velma and Rhino Gross.

Dove's lengthiest stay was with the people who inhabited the twin worlds of Oliver Finnerty's brothel and Doc Dockery's speakeasy. In the brothel he found, in addition to his old friend Kitty Twist, who had become a prostitute, Hallie Breedlove, a onetime schoolteacher who was the star of Finnerty's string of girls. Hallie was in love with Achilles Schmidt, a former circus strongman whose legs had been cut off by a train. "Legless" Schmidt's upper body was still powerful and every day he surged into Dockery's bar with the air of one who could beat up anyone there—and he could. Dove's main job at Finnerty's was to couple with the girls in the place, who were pretending to be virgins being deflowered, while customers watched through peepholes. Hallie, who still retained vestiges of her former life as a teacher, was interested in Dove's mind and helped him to continue to learn to read. Then she left town.

=== Chapter 3 ===
Dove drowned his sorrow in alcohol. Finnerty fled with the money after calling the cops. Dove spent five months in jail with the colorful petty criminals of "Tank Ten". Once out, he ran in Dockery's bar into Schmidt, now wise to Dove's affair with Hallie. Schmidt beat Dove until he became permanently blind, then people threw out Schmidt whose platform rolled downhill to his death. Dove made his way back to his hometown for 1932, where his brother was now dead and his father now a joke, and went back to Terasina.

== Use of materials ==
Algren reworked some of his material from his first novel Somebody in Boots (1935) in this later work. He also borrowed from his short stories "Kewpie Doll" (for the death scene of the little girl), "Mr. Goodbuddy and the Mighty Dripolator" (for the gift dripolator scene), "Lovers, Sec-fiends, Bugs in Flight" (for the jail scene with that quote), and "The Face on the Barroom Floor" (for the fight scene between Dove and Schmidt).

According to Algren, the title refers to the 1952 song "The Wild Side of Life".

== Film adaptation ==
In 1962 Algren's novel was adapted for the film Walk on the Wild Side, directed by Edward Dmytryk. The screenplay was written by John Fante, with Edmund Morris and Ben Hecht (the latter uncredited), and the film starred Laurence Harvey, Capucine, Jane Fonda, Anne Baxter, and Barbara Stanwyck.

== References in other works ==
In 1970, Lou Reed was approached about a project to turn A Walk on the Wild Side into a musical, a story he tells during his song of the same name on his 1978 Live: Take No Prisoners album. The project never materialized, but he used the title for his song, "Walk on the Wild Side", describing the lives of Warhol superstars he saw at The Factory.

It is referred to in Hunter S. Thompson's Hells Angels (1966) in the context of the mobility of certain elements of society, like the main characters, and how the Angels are a manifestation of that principle. He believed that the Angels were metaphorically the sons of Linkhorn and dustbowl hillbillies who were born in the great California migration.

It is referenced in the film Vertical Limit (2000) but the third rule is given as a joke about never climbing with someone you don't know.
