= The Man with the Golden Arm (novel) =

1949 novel by Nelson Algren

- First edition
- Author: Nelson Algren
- Cover artist: 'Karov'
- Language: English
- Published: 1949 Doubleday
- Publication place: United States
- Media type: Print (hardback)
- Pages: 343 pp
- OCLC: 565975
- LC Class: PS3501.L4625

The Man with the Golden Arm is a novel by Nelson Algren, published by Doubleday in November 1949. One of the seminal novels of post-World War II American letters, The Man with the Golden Arm is widely considered Algren's greatest and most enduring work. It won the National Book Award in 1950.

The novel details the trials and hardships of illicit card dealer "Frankie Machine", along with an assortment of colourful characters, on Chicago's Near Northwest Side. A veteran of World War II, Frankie struggles to stabilize his personal life while trying to make ends meet and fight a growing morphine addiction. Much of the story takes place during the immediate postwar period along Division Street and Milwaukee Avenue in the old Polish Downtown.

== Plot summary ==
The events of the novel take place between 1946 and 1948, primarily on the Near Northwest Side of Chicago. The title character is Francis Majcinek, known as "Frankie Machine," a young man of about 30 who is a gifted card dealer and an amateur drummer. While serving in World War II, Frankie is treated for shrapnel in his abdomen and medicated with morphine. He develops an addiction to the drug, although initially in the story he believes he can control his habit.

Frankie lives in a small apartment on Division Street in a Polish neighborhood with his wife, Sophie (nicknamed "Zosh"). Sophie has been using a wheelchair since a drunk-driving incident caused by Frankie (although the novel implies that her paralysis is psychological in nature). She spends most of her time looking out the window and watching the nearby elevated rail line. She takes out her frustrations by fighting with her husband, and she uses his guilt to keep him from leaving her. The turmoil in their relationship only spurs on his addiction.

Frankie works nights dealing in backroom card games operated by "Zero" Schwiefka. He aspires to join the Musicians' Union and work with jazz drummer Gene Krupa, but this dream never materializes. His constant companion and protégé is Solly "Sparrow" Saltskin, a feeble-minded half-Jewish thief who specializes in stealing and selling dogs; Frankie gets Sparrow a job as a "steerer," watching the door to the card games and drawing in gamblers.

Often referring to his drug habit as the "thirty-five-pound monkey on his back," Frankie initially tries to keep Sparrow and the others in the dark about it. He sends Sparrow away whenever he visits "Nifty Louie" Fomorowski, his supplier. One night, while fighting in a back stairwell, Frankie inadvertently kills Nifty Louie. He and Sparrow attempt to cover up his role in the murder.

Meanwhile, Frankie begins an affair with a childhood friend, "Molly-O" Novotny, after her abusive husband is arrested. Molly helps Frankie fight his addiction, but they soon become separated when Frankie is imprisoned for shoplifting and she moves out of the neighborhood. Without Molly, he begins using drugs again when he is released.

Nifty Louie owed money to politically connected men, and finding his killer becomes a priority for the police department. Sparrow is held for questioning by the police, and he is moved from station to station to circumvent habeas corpus requirements. Eventually he breaks down and reveals what he knows, and Frankie is forced to flee.

While on the run, Frankie manages to find Molly at a strip club near Lake Street. He hides in her apartment and beats his addiction, but in the end the authorities learn where he is hiding. He barely manages to escape and gets shot in the foot, leaving Molly behind. He flees to a flophouse, but without any hope of reuniting with Molly or staying free, he hangs himself in his room on April Fools' Day, 1948.

The novel ends with a transcript of the coroner's inquest, as well as a poem for Frankie entitled "Epitaph."

== Background ==
Algren began writing the novel after (much like his protagonist) returning from World War II, and he originally intended to write a war novel. The part of Chicago he lived in served as the backdrop for the story. He originally intended the title to be Night Without Mercy, but the publisher preferred a less ominous title. Algren stated that "golden arm" originated as a term frequently used by a "little Italian bookie... I knew in the Army." In craps, a golden arm is a player who has rolled dice for over one hour without losing.

Before the novel's publication, a version of its concluding poem, "Epitaph: The Man with the Golden Arm", was released in the September 1947 issue of Poetry (New York: Modern Poetry Association).

The first draft of the story did not include the topic of drug addiction. Algren later recalled, "I’d sent the book to the agent, and the agent said she liked it and all that, but it needed a peg, it didn’t seem to be hung on anything." While considering what to do, he went out for drinks with a friend who later revealed that he was an intravenous drug user. This inspired Algren to incorporate drug use into the novel.

== Reception ==
Annual National Book Awards were re-established in 1950 by the American book industry, recognizing books in three categories published in the United States during 1949. Nelson Algren and The Man With the Golden Arm won the Fiction award which is sometimes called "the first National Book Award for Fiction". (Note: Officially the awards are simply "National Book Awards" in multiple categories; "for Fiction" and so one are not part of the name. The same was true in 1950 and for the pre-war awards, in 1936 to 1942 for previous year's publications anywhere in the world. Some pre-war award categories were Most Distinguished Novel, later Favorite Fiction; Most Original Book, which might be fiction; and Bookseller Discovery, which might be fiction. See National Book Award history and its links.) Former first lady Eleanor Roosevelt made the presentation.

The novel is widely considered a classic of twentieth-century American literature.

Writing of Algren and the novel, Kurt Vonnegut stated that "he was a pioneering ancestor of mine... He broke new ground by depicting persons said to be dehumanized by poverty and ignorance and injustice as being genuinely dehumanized, and dehumanized quite permanently." Poet Carl Sandburg praised the novel's "strange midnight dignity."

In a 1949 letter to Algren, Ernest Hemingway provided the following review of the novel (which Doubleday chose not to include in its marketing):

Into a world of letters where we have the fading Faulkner and that overgrown Li'l Abner Thomas Wolfe casts a shorter shadow every day, Algren comes like a corvette or even a big destroyer... Algren can hit with both hands and move around and he will kill you if you are not awfully careful... Mr. Algren, boy, you are good.

In his 1981 obituary for Algren, Chicago newspaper columnist Mike Royko, who grew up near Division Street, recalled first reading the book while serving in the Korean War. "It was the first time I had read a novel that was set in a place I knew. And Algren, with The Man with the Golden Arm, had captured it. He had the people, the sounds, the alleys, the streets, the feel of the place."

The novel was controversial at the time, and it did receive some critical reviews. In a 1956 article for The New Yorker entitled "The Man with the Golden Beef," Norman Podhoretz was critical of what he saw as the glorification of the underclass at the expense of respectable society. This sentiment was shared by Leslie Fiedler in an article on Algren's writings for The Reporter entitled "The Noble Savages of Skid Row."

Like Algren's previous novel, Never Come Morning, The Man with the Golden Arm drew fire from leaders of Chicago's Polish community, who criticized the portrayal of their community in the story. Royko wrote of these critics, "They believed that... Algren was presenting them in a poor light. I guess they would have preferred that he write a novel about a Polish dentist who changed his name and moved from the old neighborhood to a suburb as soon as he made enough money."

== Film adaptation ==
In 1955, the book was made into a film directed by Otto Preminger and starring Frank Sinatra. Though author Nelson Algren was initially brought to Hollywood to work on the screenplay, he was quickly replaced by Walter Newman. Algren felt negatively about his experiences in Hollywood, the lack of compensation he received, and the liberties taken by the filmmakers (which included an entirely different ending from the novel). When photographer and friend Art Shay asked Algren to pose below the film's marquee, he is reported to have said "What does that movie have to do with me?"; on another occasion Algren commented about the movie that "Sinatra shook heroin like he shook a summer cold".
