= Polish Downtown (Chicago) =

Polish community in the United States

Coordinates: 41°54′13″N 87°40′2″W

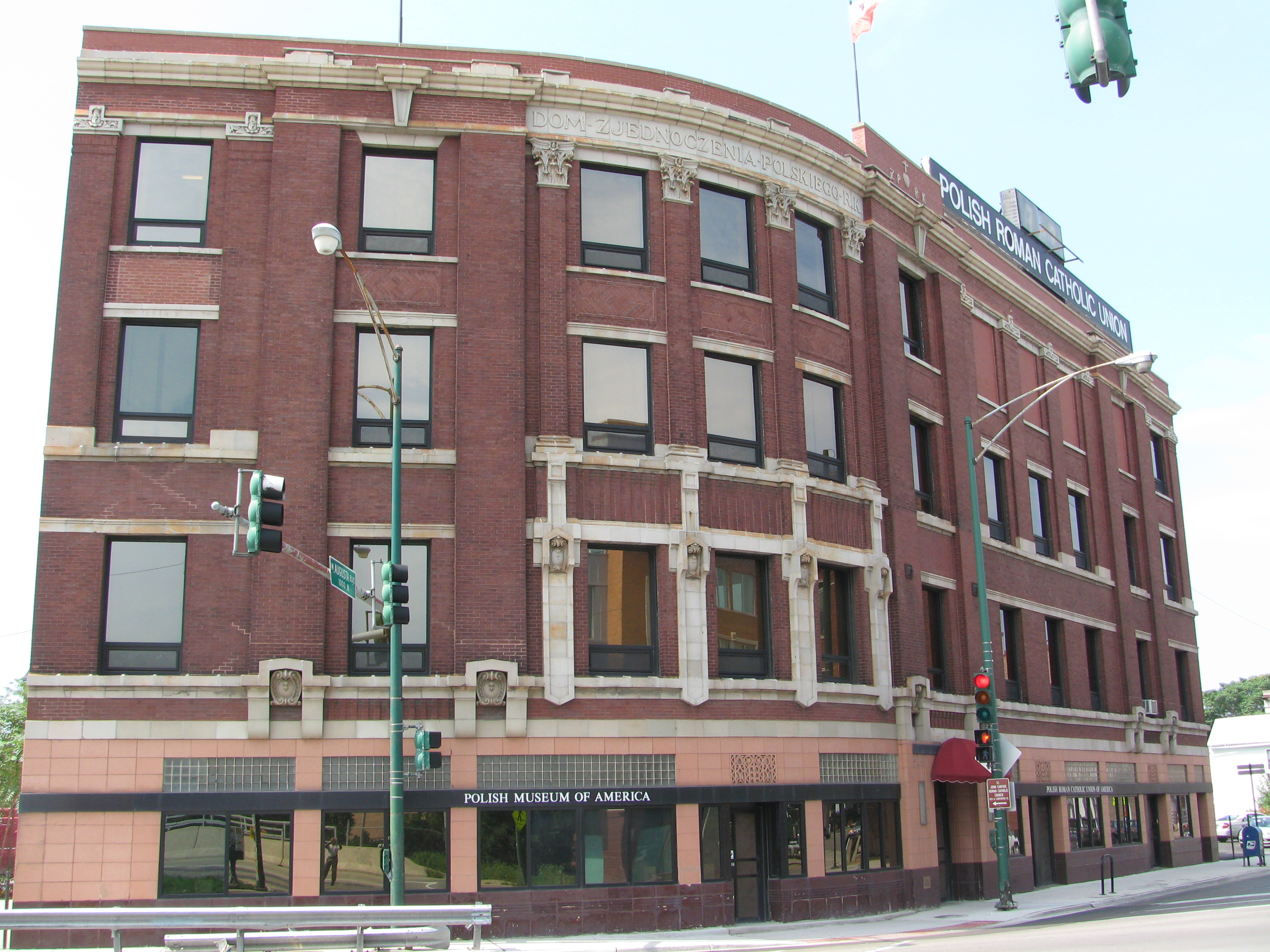
The Polish Museum of America in the PRCUA building designed by John S. Flizikowski is in the old Polish Downtown.

Polish Downtown was Chicago's oldest and most prominent Polish settlement. Polish Downtown was the political, cultural and social capital of Poles in Chicago and of other Polish Americans throughout North America. Centered on Polonia Triangle at the intersection of Division, Ashland and Milwaukee Avenue, the headquarters for almost every major Polish organization in the United States was clustered within its vicinity, beginning with the Polish National Alliance to the Polish Daily News.

== Description ==
Located on the city's near northwest side, the area of Polish Downtown shifted and expanded over time as Polish immigration to Chicago increased along with other Eastern Europeans amid Chicago's population boom in the late nineteenth century.

Historian Edward R. Kantowicz gave the following boundaries for Polish Downtown: Racine Avenue to the east, Fullerton Avenue to the North, Kedzie Avenue to the West and Grand Avenue to the South. The historian Dominic Pacyga notes that this district was not exclusively Polish, and that Italians, Ukrainians, and Jews each possessed their own enclaves within the area. The Polish character of the neighborhood visibly predominated over others in the area, as there was an extensive network of Polish churches, businesses, cultural institutions and fraternal organizations.

The following neighborhoods of Chicago were once a part of Polish Downtown:

- Pulaski Park, Chicago
- River West, Chicago
- Bucktown, Chicago
- Wicker Park, Chicago
- East Village, Chicago
- Noble Square, Chicago

== History ==
The beginnings of the "Polish Patch" that eventually became Polish Downtown are traced back to Anthony Smarzewski-Schermann, who settled in the area in 1851. John Joseph Parot described the area at the time in his book Polish Catholics in Chicago:

"Schermann's property and surrounding environment must have reminded him of many Polish farming communities. From the still undeveloped and sparsely settled prairie on the outskirts of ante-bellum Chicago, he could see nothing but grassland stretching westward to the horizon. East of his land stood a thickly wooded area guarding both the both banks of the nearby North Branch of the Chicago River which swung noose like around Goose Island. The virgin land between Schermann's settlement and the river was populated at the time only by chickens and cattle belonging to neighboring farms; fifty years later this same land would support the highest population density in the city-more than 450 Polish immigrants on each acre of land, packed into tenement houses. But in the 1850s Schermann's rural outpost was a picture of serenity His only outlet was Plank Road, a clumsily built highway actually constructed from wooden planks- a far cry from the bustling commercial thoroughfare later called Milwaukee Avenue along which Polish merchants in the 1920s built their own "Polish Downtown." Schermann's closest neighbors were other Polish settlers, perhaps landless tenant farmers, numbering approximately thirty families during the American Civil War.

This rustic idyll would change dramatically as Chicago's population would grow exponentially following the American Civil War, with increased immigration from Europe. Fueled by the expansion of industry as well as the city's central role as a transportation hub, immigrants, predominately from Eastern and Southern Europe moved to Chicago. By 1890, half of all of Chicago's Poles lived in Polish Downtown. The centrality of this area as the site of initial settlement for the large numbers of newly arriving Polish immigrants was reinforced after the first Polish parish, St. Stanislaus Kostka, was founded in 1867 and Holy Trinity Polish Mission a few years later in 1872. Together the churches made the largest parish in the world, with a combined membership of over 60,000 in the early 1900s. Polish Downtown was in every way "a classic ghetto"; in 1898, eleven contiguous precincts, which contained the heart of the neighborhood at Polonia Triangle, were 86.3% Polish, with one of these precincts reported as 99.9% Polish with only one non-Pole among 2,500 inhabitants.

Along with Holy Trinity Polish Mission, St. Stanislaus Kostka was the center of Chicago's Polish community. The neighborhood became called "Kostkaville". Much of this was due to Saint Stanislaus Kostka's first pastor, Reverend Vincent Michael Barzynski, who is described as "one of the greatest organizers of Polish immigrants in Chicago and America". Barzynski was responsible for founding 23 Polish parishes in Chicago, along with six elementary schools, two high schools, a college, orphanages, newspapers, and St. Mary of Nazareth Hospital, as well as the national headquarters of the Polish Roman Catholic Union of America.

Polish immigration into the area accelerated during and after World War II; as many as 150,000 Poles are estimated to have arrived between 1939 and 1959 as displaced persons. Poles clustered in established ethnic enclaves such as this one, which offered shops, restaurants, and banks where people spoke their language. Division Street was referred to as Polish Broadway, "teeming with flophouses and gambling dens and polka clubs and workingman's bars like the Gold Star and Phyllis' Musical Inn".

== Cultural significance ==
The historian Edward R. Kantowicz wrote in his essay, "Polish Chicago: Survival through Solidarity", that "Polish Downtown was to Chicago Poles what the Lower East Side was to New York's Jews." Victoria Granacki in Polish Downtown wrote, "Nearly all Polish undertakings of any consequence in the U.S. during that time either started or were directed from this part of Chicago's near northwest side".

Polish Downtown, particularly Pulaski Park, served as Chicago Congressman Dan Rostenkowski's base of operations. The family still owns the building opposite St. Stanislaus Kostka church at 1372 Evergreen from which he ran his operations.

Polish Downtown was also significant in the literary output of Nelson Algren who lived in the area. Polish bars that Algren frequented for his notorious gambling, such as the Bit of Poland on Milwaukee Avenue, figured in his novels such as Never Come Morning and The Man with the Golden Arm. Algren, who compared Ashland Avenue to "a bridge between Warsaw and Chicago" had a complex if not troubled relationship with Chicago Polonia. His second wife Amanda Kontowicz was Polish, and would listen to old Polish love songs sung by an elderly waitress while gambling. His writing about the area's Polish American underclass, against the background of prevalent anti-immigrant xenophobia, was taken by Poles as blatant Anti-Polonism. His book Never Come Morning was banned for decades from the Chicago Public Library system because of the massive outcry against it by Chicago Polonia. Later efforts to commemorate Algren brought up old controversies: for example, when the city proposed renaming a portion of Evergreen Street, where Algren lived, as Algren Street, and, in the 1990s, when the Polonia Triangle was to be renamed in Algren's honor.

Polish Downtown also figures in John Guzlowski’s writing. His memoir Echoes of Tattered Tongues: Memory Unfolded (Aquila Polonica Press) chronicles the author's experiences growing up among the immigrants and displaced persons living there. He heard and saw Jewish hardware store clerks who had Auschwitz tattoos on their wrists, Polish Cavalry officers who mourned for their dead horses, and Polish women who had walked from Siberia to Iran to escape the Russians. His Hank and Marvin Mysteries (Suitcase Charlie, Little Altar Boy, and Murdertown) are also set in this area.

== Religion ==
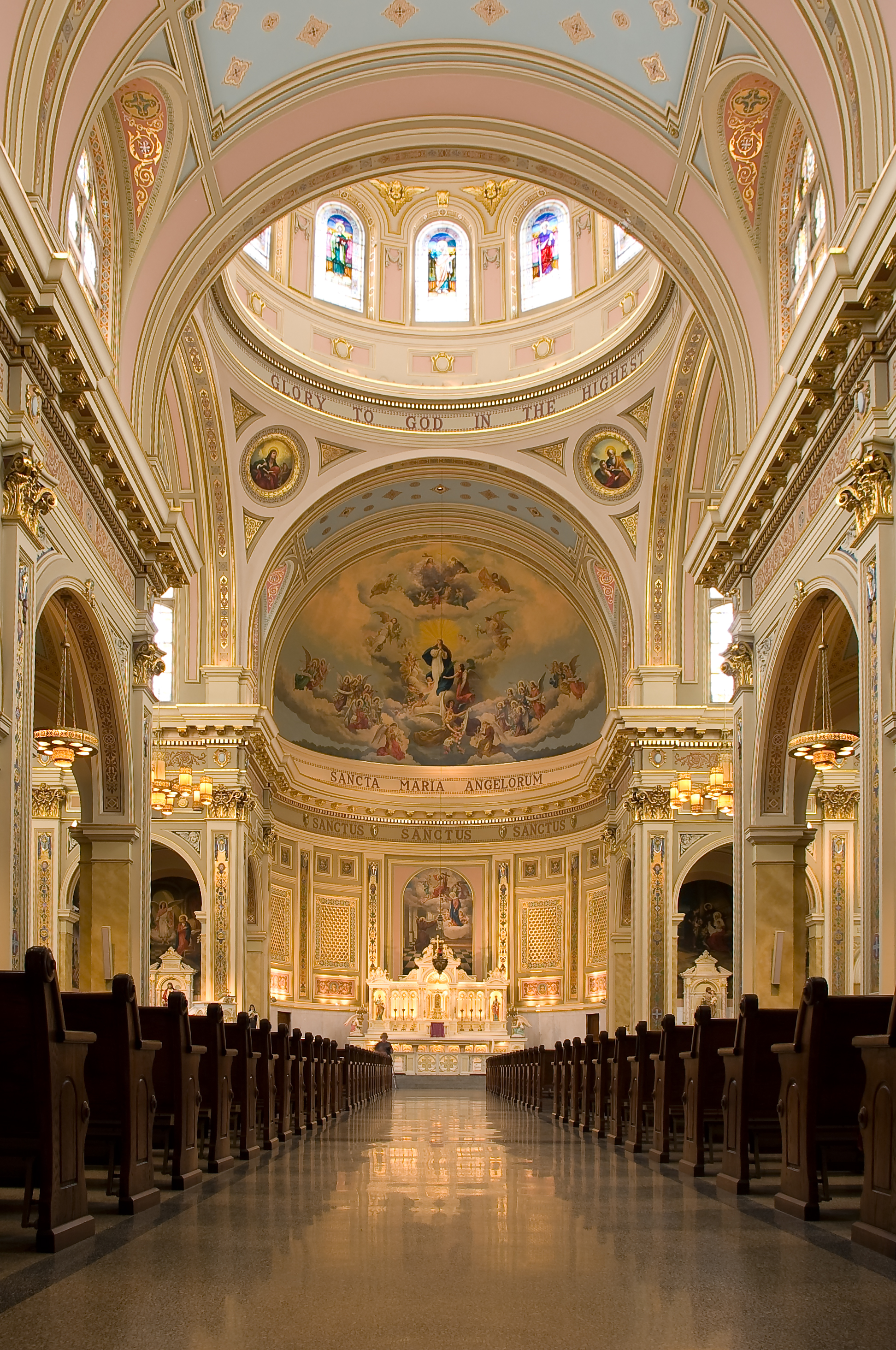
Interior of St. Mary of the Angels Catholic Church.

Polish Downtown contained a number of "Polish Cathedrals" that can be seen by drivers on the Kennedy Expressway. The combined membership of the exclusively Polish Roman Catholic parishes of Polish Downtown together had over 100,000 parishioners in 1918, all located within a one-mile radius.

Although most of them are Roman Catholic churches, a schism that escalated into violence by parishioners of St. Hedwig's Church led to the founding of an independent Polish Catholic parish. This parish eventually joined the Polish National Catholic Church. Raised to the status of a cathedral, the parish erected a new building designed by famed architect J.G Steinbach in 1930. The Covenant Presbyterian Church bought the building in 1993.

== Decline ==
Completion of the Kennedy Expressway in 1960, whose construction had displaced many residents, disrupted the network of Polish-American churches, settlement houses, and neighborhood groups. Additionally Puerto Ricans and other Latinos displaced by urban renewal in Old Town and Lincoln Park began moving in. In 1960 Latinos comprised less than 1 percent of West Town's population, but by 1970 that proportion had increased to 39 percent. At the same time, more established ethnic Poles moved out to newer housing in the suburbs, following World War II and the housing boom.

Downtown banks redlined West Town for much of the mid-20th century. Real estate values plummeted as landlords neglected their buildings and speculators sat on vacant land and abandoned property. Small businesses along Chicago Avenue closed. The arson rate in the vicinity was so high that in 1976, Mayor Richard J. Daley convened a task force to address the crisis. The Polish exodus out of the neighborhood followed the Kennedy Expressway into the suburbs. The Northwest Community Organization was founded in 1962 to stem white flight by promoting home ownership and integration between longtime ethnic Eastern European residents and the newcomers. The institutional infrastructure that held Ukrainian Village together during the 1970s and 1980s was lacking in East Village. Much of the Polish population had moved northwestward to Avondale, Jefferson Park and beyond. The Latino community, which had begun to organize around issues of affordable housing and other redevelopment strategies designed to stave off displacement, increasingly came into conflict with the mostly European-American artists and other urban-pioneer types. By the early 1980s, the latter were a minor but significant presence in the area.

== Legacy ==
The neighborhoods that comprise the old Polish Downtown have been gentrified and now present a cosmopolitan mix of people of diverse backgrounds. While Polish Downtown is no longer the center of Chicago's Polish Community, its legacy is present in the businesses, restaurants, and historic buildings. Numerous prominent Polish-American cultural and civic institutions continue operation in the area.
