= Nelson Algren =

American writer (1909–1981)

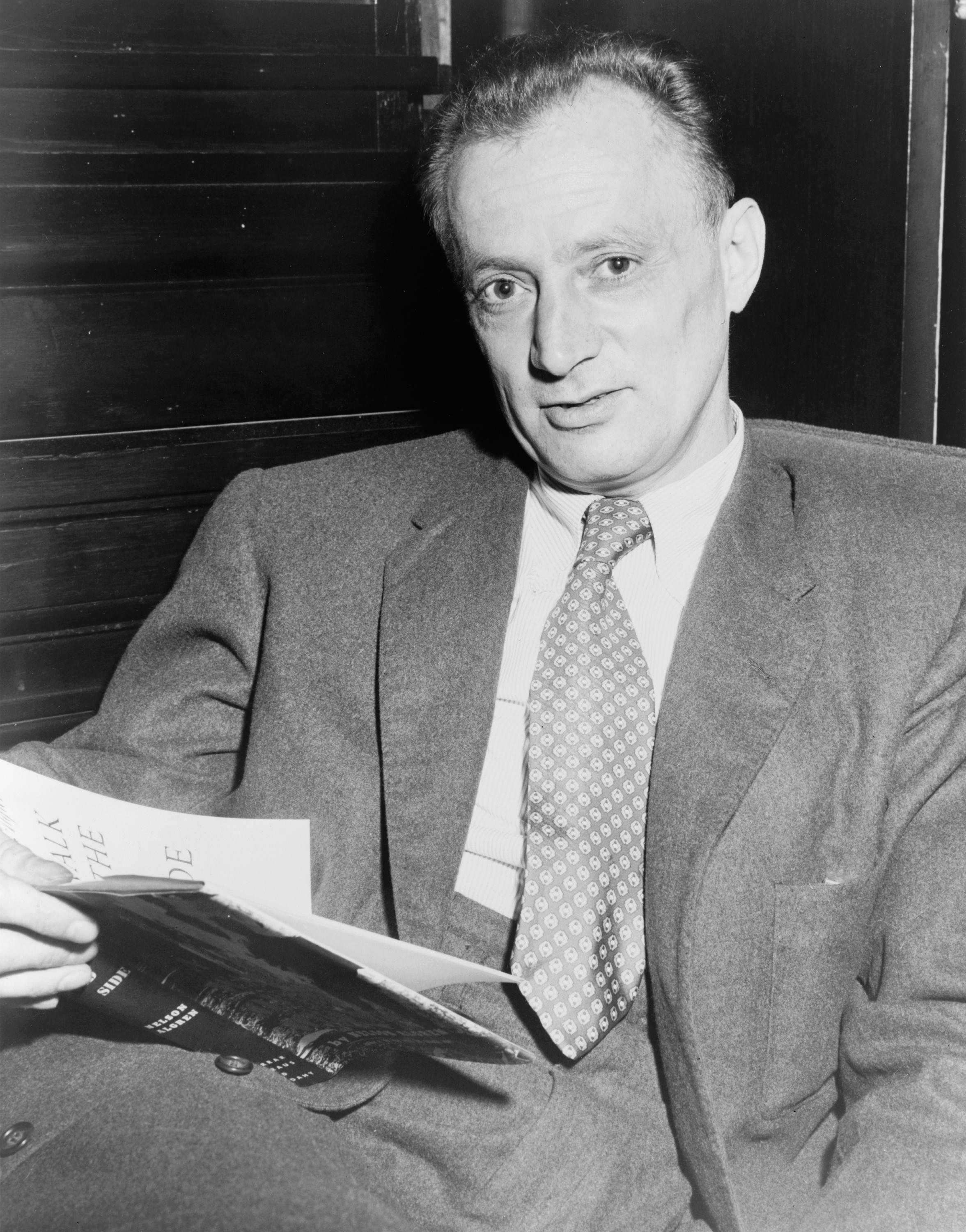
- Algren in 1956
- Born: Nelson Ahlgren Abraham; March 28, 1909; Detroit, Michigan, U.S.
- Died: May 9, 1981 (aged 72); Long Island, New York, U.S.
- Education: University of Illinois, Urbana–Champaign (BA)
- Occupation: Writer
- Spouses: Amanda Kontowicz (m. 1937; div. 1946); Betty Ann Jones (m. 1965; div. 1967)
- Partner: Simone de Beauvoir (1947–1964)
- Writing career
- Genres: Novel, short story
- Notable awards: National Book Award; 1950

Nelson Algren (born Nelson Ahlgren Abraham; March 28, 1909 – May 9, 1981) was an American writer. His 1949 novel The Man with the Golden Arm won the National Book Award and was adapted as the 1955 film of the same name.

Algren articulated the world of "drunks, pimps, prostitutes, freaks, drug addicts, prize fighters, corrupt politicians, and hoodlums". Art Shay singled out a poem Algren wrote from the perspective of a "halfy," street slang for a legless man on wheels. Shay said that Algren considered this poem to be a key to everything he had ever written. The protagonist talks about "how forty wheels rolled over his legs and how he was ready to strap up and give death a wrestle."

According to Harold Augenbraum, "in the late 1940s and early 1950s he was one of the best known literary writers in America." A lover of French writer Simone de Beauvoir, he is featured in her novel The Mandarins, set in Paris and Chicago. He was called "a sort of bard of the down-and-outer" based on this book, but also on his short stories in The Neon Wilderness (1947) and his novel A Walk on the Wild Side (1956). The latter was adapted as the 1962 film of the same name (directed by Edward Dmytryk, screenplay by John Fante).

== Life ==
Algren was born in Detroit, Michigan, the son of Goldie (née Kalisher) and Gerson Abraham. At the age of three, he moved with his parents to Chicago, Illinois, where they lived in a working-class, immigrant neighborhood on the South Side. His father was the son of a Swedish convert to Judaism, through his German Jewish wife. His mother was of German Jewish descent and owned a candy store on the South Side of town. When he was young, Algren's family lived at 7139 S. South Park Avenue (now S. Martin Luther King Jr. Drive) in the Greater Grand Crossing section of Chicago.

When he was eight, his family moved from the South Side to an apartment at 4834 N. Troy Street, in the North Side neighborhood of Albany Park. His father worked as an auto mechanic nearby on North Kedzie Avenue.

In his essay Chicago: City on the Make, Algren added autobiographical details: he recalled being teased by neighborhood children after moving to Troy Street because he was a fan of the South Side White Sox. Despite living most of his life on the North Side, Algren never changed his affiliation and remained a White Sox fan.

Algren was educated in Chicago's public schools, graduated from Hibbard High School (now Roosevelt High School) and went on to study at the University of Illinois at Urbana–Champaign, graduating with a Bachelor of Science in journalism during the Great Depression in 1931. During his time at the University of Illinois, he wrote for the Daily Illini student newspaper.

=== Literary career and marriage ===
Algren wrote his first story, "So Help Me", in 1933, while he was in Texas working at a gas station. Before returning to Chicago, he was caught stealing a typewriter from an empty classroom at Sul Ross State University in Alpine. He boarded a train for his getaway but was apprehended and returned to Alpine. He was held in jail for nearly five months and faced a possible additional three years in prison. He was released, but the incident made a deep impression on him. It deepened his identification with outsiders, has-beens, and the general failures who later populated his fictional world.

In 1935 Algren won the first of his three O. Henry Awards for his short story, "The Brother's House." The story was first published in Story magazine and was reprinted in an anthology of O. Henry Award winners.

His first novel, Somebody in Boots (1935), was later dismissed by Algren as primitive and politically naive, claiming he infused it with Marxist ideas he little understood, because they were fashionable at the time. The book was unsuccessful and went out of print.

Algren married Amanda Kontowicz in 1937. He had met her at a party celebrating the publication of Somebody in Boots. They eventually would divorce and remarry before divorcing a second and final time.

His second novel, Never Come Morning (1942), was described by Andrew O'Hagan in 2019 as "the book that really shows the Algren style in its first great flourishing." It portrays the dead-end life of a doomed young Polish-American boxer turned criminal. Ernest Hemingway, in a July 8, 1942, letter to his publisher Maxwell Perkins, said of the novel: "I think it very, very good. It is as fine and good stuff to come out of Chicago." The novel offended members of Chicago's large Polish-American community, some of whose members denounced it as pro-Axis propaganda. Not knowing that Algren was of partly Jewish descent, some incensed Polish-American Chicagoans said he was pro-Nazi Nordic. His Polish-American critics persuaded Mayor Edward Joseph Kelly to ban the novel from the Chicago Public Library.

=== Military service ===
Algren served as a private in the European Theater of World War II as a litter bearer. Despite being a college graduate, he was denied entry into Officer Candidate School. There is conjecture that it may have been due to suspicion regarding his political beliefs, but his criminal conviction would have most likely excluded him from OCS.

According to Bettina Drew in her 1989 biography Nelson Algren: A Life on the Wild Side, Algren had no desire to serve in the war but was drafted in 1943. An indifferent soldier, he dealt on the black market while he was stationed in France. He received a bad beating by some fellow black marketeers.

=== Fame ===
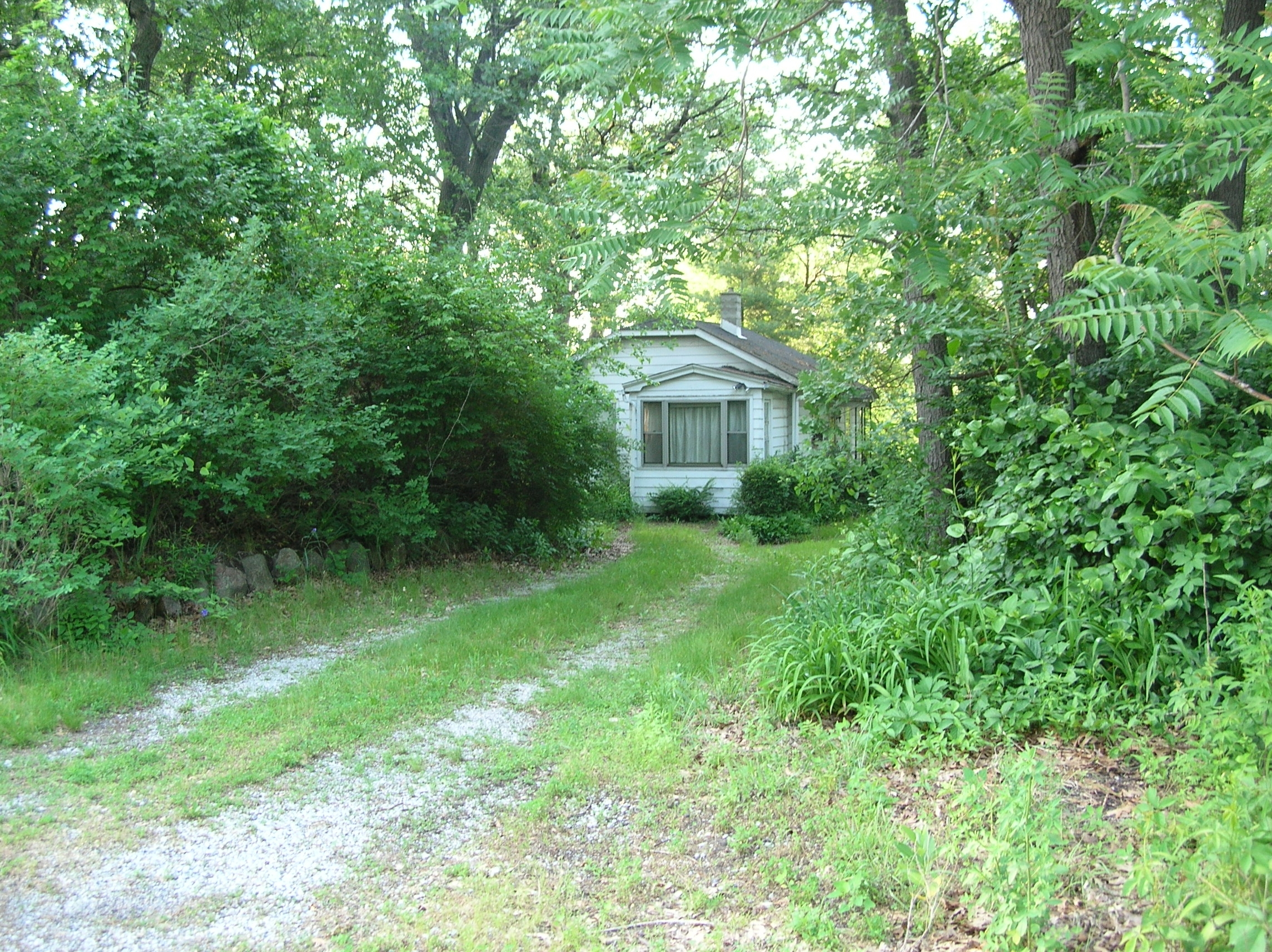
Dunes cottage where Algren and de Beauvoir summered in Miller Beach, Indiana.

Algren's first short-story collection, The Neon Wilderness (1947), collected 24 stories from 1933 to 1947. The same year, Algren received an award from the American Academy of Arts and Letters and a grant from Chicago's Newberry Library.

It was in that same year that Algren began an affair with Simone de Beauvoir. Mary Guggenheim, who had been Algren's lover, recommended that Beauvoir visit Algren in Chicago. The couple would summer together in Algren's cottage in the lake front community of Miller Beach, Indiana, and also travel to Latin America together in 1949. In her novel The Mandarins (1954), Beauvoir wrote of Algren (who is 'Lewis Brogan' in the book):

At first I found it amusing meeting in the flesh that classic American species: self-made leftist writer. Now, I began taking an interest in Brogan. Through his stories, you got the feeling that he claimed no rights to life and that nevertheless he had always had a passionate desire to live. I liked that mixture of modesty and eagerness.

Algren and Beauvoir eventually became disenchanted with each other. A bitter Algren wrote of Beauvoir and her longtime companion Jean-Paul Sartre in a Playboy magazine article about a trip he took to North Africa with Beauvoir, that she and Sartre were bigger users of others, than a prostitute and her pimp in their own way.

Algren's next novel, The Man with the Golden Arm (1949), would become his best known work. It won the National Book Award for Fiction in 1950. The protagonist of the book, Frankie Machine, is an aspiring drummer and also a dealer in illicit card games. Frankie becomes trapped in the demimonde of Chicago, having picked up a morphine habit during his brief military service during World War II. He is married to a woman he mistakenly believes became crippled in a car accident he caused.

Algren's next book, Chicago: City on the Make (1951), was a scathing essay that outraged the city's boosters but portrayed the back alleys of the city, its dispossessed, its corrupt politicians and its swindlers. Algren also declared his love of the city as a "lovely so real".

The Man With the Golden Arm was adapted as a 1955 movie of the same name, starring Frank Sinatra and directed and produced by Otto Preminger. Algren soon withdrew from direct involvement. It was a commercial success but Algren loathed the film. He sued Preminger seeking an injunction to stop him from claiming ownership of the property as "An Otto Preminger film", but he soon withdrew his suit for financial reasons.

In the fall of 1955, Algren was interviewed for The Paris Review by rising author Terry Southern. Algren and Southern became friends through this meeting and remained in touch for many years. Algren became one of Southern's most enthusiastic early supporters and, when he taught creative writing in later years, he often used Southern as an example of a great short story writer.

Algren had another commercial success with the novel A Walk on the Wild Side (1956). He reworked some of the material from his first novel, Somebody in Boots, as well as picking up elements from several published short stories, such as his 1947 "The Face on the Barroom Floor". The novel was about a wandering Texan adrift during the early years of the Great Depression. He said it was superior to the earlier book. It was adapted as the 1962 movie of the same name. Some critics thought the film bowdlerized the book, and it was not commercially successful.

=== Decline and second marriage ===
A Walk on the Wild Side was Algren's last commercial success. He turned to teaching creative writing at the University of Iowa's Writers Workshop to supplement his income.

In 1965, he met Betty Ann Jones while teaching at the Writers Workshop. They married that year and divorced in 1967. According to Kurt Vonnegut, who taught with him at Iowa in 1965, Algren's "enthusiasm for writing, reading and gambling left little time for the duties of a married man."

Algren played a small part in Philip Kaufman's underground comedy Fearless Frank (1967) as a mobster named Needles.

In 1968, he signed the Writers and Editors War Tax Protest pledge, vowing to refuse tax payments in protest against the Vietnam War.

According to Bettina Drew's biography, Algren angled for a journalism job in South Vietnam. Strapped for cash more than a decade after his only two commercially successful novels, he saw Vietnam as an opportunity to make money, not from journalism fees but dealing on the black market.

=== Hurricane Carter and Paterson, New Jersey ===
In 1975, Algren was commissioned to write a magazine article about the trial of Rubin "Hurricane" Carter, the prize fighter who had been found guilty of double murder. While researching the article, Algren visited Carter's hometown of Paterson, New Jersey. Algren was instantly fascinated by the city of Paterson and he immediately decided to move there. In the summer of 1975, Algren sold off most of his belongings, left Chicago, and moved into an apartment in Paterson.

=== Death ===
In 1980, Algren moved to a house in Sag Harbor, Long Island. He died of a heart attack at home on May 9, 1981. He is buried in Oakland Cemetery, Sag Harbor, Long Island.

== Posthumously published works ==
After Algren died, it was discovered that the article about Hurricane Carter had grown into a novel, The Devil's Stocking, which was published posthumously in 1983.

In September 1996, the book Nonconformity was published by Seven Stories Press, presenting Algren's view of the difficulties surrounding the 1955 film adaptation of The Man With the Golden Arm. Nonconformity also presents the belief system behind Algren's writing and a call to writers everywhere to investigate the dark and represent the ignored. The Neon Wilderness and The Last Carousel were also reprinted by Seven Stories Press and recognized as the Library Journal Editors' Best Reprints of 1997.

In 2009, Seven Stories then published Entrapment and Other Writings, a major collection of previously unpublished writings that included two early short stories, "Forgive Them, Lord," and "The Lightless Room," and the long unfinished novel fragment referenced in the book's title. In 2019, Blackstone Audio released the complete library of Algren's books as audiobooks. And in 2020 Olive Films released Nelson Algren Live, a performance film of Algren's life and work starring Willem Dafoe and Barry Gifford, among others, produced by the Seven Stories Institute.

== Political views and FBI surveillance ==
Algren's friend Stuart McCarrell described him as a "gut radical," who generally sided with the downtrodden but was uninterested in ideological debates and was politically inactive for most of his life. McCarrell states that Algren's heroes were the "prairie radicals" Theodore Dreiser, John Peter Altgeld, Clarence Darrow and Eugene V. Debs. Algren references all of these men – as well as Big Bill Haywood, the Haymarket defendants and the Memorial Day Massacre victims – in Chicago: City on the Make.

Algren told McCarrell that he never joined the Communist Party, despite its appeal to artists and intellectuals during the Great Depression. Among other reasons, he cited negative experiences both he and Richard Wright had with party members. However, his involvement in groups deemed "subversive" during the McCarthy years drew the attention of the Federal Bureau of Investigation (FBI). Among his affiliations, he was a participant in the John Reed Club in the 1930s and later an honorary co-chair of the "Save Ethel and Julius Rosenberg Committee" in Chicago. According to Herbert Mitgang, the FBI suspected Algren's political views and kept a dossier on him amounting to more than 500 pages but identified nothing concretely subversive.

During the 1950s, Algren wished to travel to Paris with his romantic companion, Simone de Beauvoir, but due to government surveillance his passport applications were denied. When he finally did get a passport in 1960, McCarrell concludes that "it was too late. By then the relationship [with de Beauvoir] had changed subtly but decisively."

== Algren and Chicago Polonia ==
Algren described Ashland Avenue as figuratively connecting Chicago to Warsaw in Poland. His own life involved the Polish community of Chicago in many ways, including his first wife Amanda Kontowicz. His friend Art Shay wrote about Algren, who while gambling, listened to old Polish love songs sung by an elderly waitress. The city's Polish Downtown, where he lived for years, played a significant part in his literary output. Polish bars that Algren frequented in his gambling, such as the Bit of Poland on Milwaukee Avenue, figured in such writings as Never Come Morning and The Man With the Golden Arm.

His novel Never Come Morning was published several years after the invasion of Poland by Nazi Germany and the Soviet Union, a period when Poles, like Jews, were labeled an inferior race by Nazi ideology. Chicago's Polish-American leaders thought Never Come Morning played on these anti-Polish stereotypes, and launched a sustained campaign against the book through the Polish press, the Polish Roman Catholic Union of America, and other Polish-American institutions. Articles appeared in the local Polish newspapers and letters were sent to Mayor Ed Kelly, the Chicago Public Library, and Algren's publisher, Harper & Brothers. The general tone of the campaign is suggested by a Zgoda editorial that attacked his character and mental state, saw readers who got free copies as victims of a Nazi-financed plot, and said the novel proved a deep desire to harm ethnic Poles on Algren's part. The Polish American Council sent a copy of a resolution condemning the novel to the FBI. Algren and his publisher defended against these accusations, with the author telling a library meeting that the book was about the effects of poverty, regardless of national background. The mayor had the novel removed from the Chicago Public Library system, and it apparently remained absent for at least 20 years. At least two later efforts to commemorate Algren in Polish Downtown echoed the attacks on the novels.

Shortly after his death in 1981, his last Chicago residence at 1958 West Evergreen Street was noted by Chicago journalist Mike Royko. The walk-up apartment just east of Damen Avenue in the former Polish Downtown neighborhood of West Town was in an area that had been dominated by Polish immigrants and was once one of Chicago's toughest and most crowded neighborhoods. The renaming of Evergreen Street to Algren Street caused controversy and was almost immediately reversed.

In 1998, Algren enthusiasts instigated the renaming after Algren of the Polish Triangle in what had been the center of the Polish Downtown. Replacing the plaza's traditional name, the director of the Polish Museum of America predicted, would obliterate the history of Chicago ethnic Poles and insult ethnic Polish institutions and local businesses. In the end a compromise was reached where the Triangle kept its older name and a newly installed fountain was named after Algren and inscribed with a quotation about the city's working people protecting its essence, from Algren's essay "Chicago: City on the Make".

== Hoax broadcast ==
A passage featured in Algren's book The Devil's Stocking (1983) was broadcast on TV some six years earlier during the Southern Television hoax in the UK which generated international publicity when students interrupted the regular broadcast through the Hannington transmitter of the Independent Broadcasting Authority for six minutes on November 26, 1977. Issue No. 24 of Fortean Times (Winter 1977) transcribed the hoaxer's message as:

This is the voice of Asteron. I am an authorized representative of the Intergalactic Mission and I have a message for the planet Earth. We are beginning to enter the period of Aquarius and there are many corrections which have to be made by Earth people. All your weapons of evil must be destroyed. You have only a short time to live to learn to live together in peace. You must live in peace or leave the galaxy.

The Devil's Stocking is Algren's fictionalized account of the trial of Rubin "Hurricane" Carter, a real-life prize-fighter who had been found guilty of double murder, about whom Algren had written a magazine article for Esquire in 1975. In the book, as a period of unrest within the prison begins, the character 'Kenyatta' gives a speech closely mirroring the Fortean Times transcript of the 1977 hoax, and those of other American newspaper reports of the broadcast. The passage in Algren's book says:

I am an authorized representative of the Intergalactic Mission," Kenyatta finally disclosed his credentials. "I have a message for the Planet Earth. We are beginning to enter the period of Aquarius. Many corrections have to be made by Earth people. All your weapons of evil must be destroyed. You have only a short time to learn to live together in peace. You must live in peace" – here he paused to gain everybody's attention – "you must live in peace or leave the galaxy!"

== Honors and awards ==
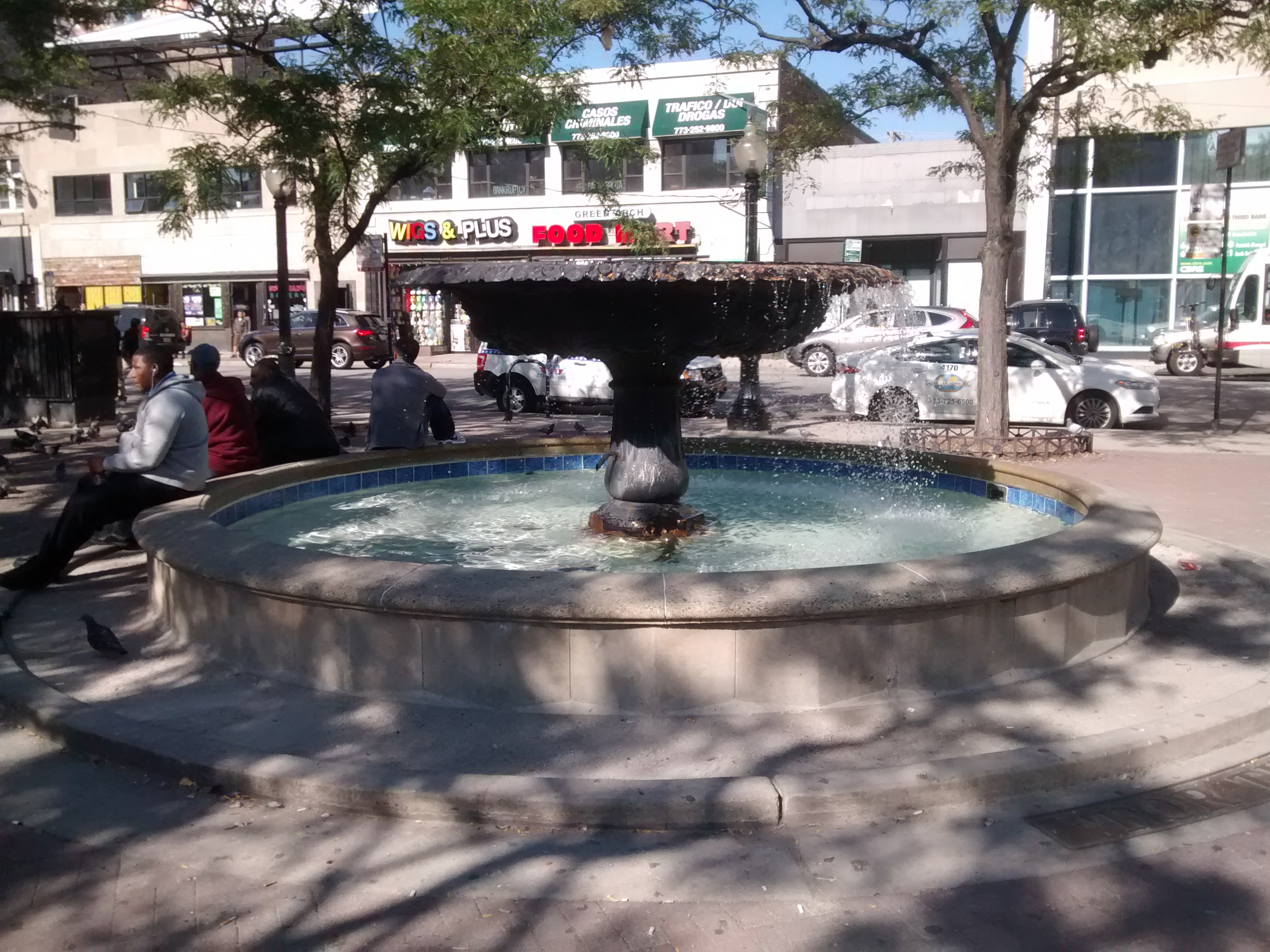
The Nelson Algren Memorial fountain in Chicago

Algren won his first O. Henry Award for his short story "The Brother's House" (published in Story Magazine) in 1935. His short stories "A Bottle of Milk for Mother (Biceps)" (published in the Southern Review) and "The Captain is Impaled" (Harper's Magazine) were O. Henry Award winners in 1941 and 1950, respectively. None of the stories won the first, second or third place awards but were included in the annual collection of O. Henry Award stories.

The Man with the Golden Arm won the National Book Award for Fiction in 1950.

In 1947 Algren won an Arts and Letters Award from the National Institute of Arts and Letters, the forerunner to the American Academy of Arts and Letters. In 1974 the Institute awarded him the Award of Merit Medal for the novel. And three months before he died in 1981, Algren was elected to the Academy of Arts and Letters.

Algren was also honored in 1998 with the Nelson Algren Fountain located in Chicago's Polish Triangle, in what had been the heart of Polish Downtown, the area that figured as the inspiration for much of his work. Appropriately enough, Division Street, Algren's favorite street as well as the onetime Polish Broadway, runs right past it.

In 2010, Algren was posthumously inducted into the Chicago Literary Hall of Fame.

== In popular culture ==
=== In literature and publications ===
- In his 1967 novella, Trout Fishing in America, Richard Brautigan writes about crating up and mailing a crippled wino (Trout Fishing in America Shorty) to Nelson Algren.
- In 2011, literary publication 3:AM Magazine named Algren a cult hero.

=== In music ===
- Leonard Cohen used images from The Man with the Golden Arm in "The Stranger Song", from his first album, Songs of Leonard Cohen (1967): "you've seen that man before: his golden arm dispatching cards, but now it's rusted from the elbows to the finger."
- In the documentary Classic Albums: Lou Reed: Transformer, musician Lou Reed says that Algren's 1956 novel, A Walk on the Wild Side, was the launching point for his similarly titled 1972 song.
- According to the liner notes of The Tubes' second album, Young and Rich (1976), A Walk on the Wild Side is the inspiration for their song "Pimp".
- The Verve has a song called "Neon Wilderness" on their 1997 album Urban Hymns.
- The Minnesota-based punk-rock band Dillinger Four quote Algren as an inspiration in the song "Doublewhiskeycokenoice" from their 1998 album Midwestern Songs of the Americas. In that song Patrick Costello sings "Nelson Algren came to me and said, 'Celebrate the ugly things' / The beat-up side of what they call pride could be the measure of these days."
- The 2002 album Adult World by guitarist Wayne Kramer (founding member of the Detroit band MC5) contains a song titled "Nelson Algren Stopped By," in which guest band X-Mars-X provides a shuffling jazz background while Kramer reads a prose poem about walking the streets of present-day Chicago with Algren.
- In 2005, The Hold Steady mentioned Algren in the song "Chicago Seemed Tired Last Night" from the Separation Sunday album. The first line of the song is "Nelson Algren came to Paddy at some party at the Dead End Alley/He told him what to celebrate" and toward the end the song goes "Hey Nelson Algren. Chicago seemed tired last night/They had cigarettes where there were supposed to be eyes." The name 'Paddy' in the song is a reference to Patrick Costello and the 'Dead End Alley' is the name of the house where the Dillinger Four's members used to live.
- The Devil Wears Prada on their 2019 album The Act has the song "Please Say No" which is based on the novel Never Come Morning.

=== Onstage ===
- In 1988, A Walk on the Wild Side was staged as a musical at the Back Alley Theatre in Van Nuys, California. Will Holt, who wrote the book, music, and lyrics, went on to win the Los Angeles Dramalogue Critics Award for his work.
- In 2000, John Susman's play Nelson & Simone was produced at Chicago's Live Bait Theatre, directed by Richard Cotovsky, and starring Gary Houston and Rebecca Covey. The play dramatizes the love affair between Algren and Simone de Beauvoir.

== Nelson Algren Award ==
The Nelson Algren Award, also known as the Nelson Algren Short Story Award and Nelson Algren Literary Award, is or was a nationally recognized award for short fiction, open to writers living in the U.S. It was established in 1981 by Chicago magazine, supported by Brena and Lee A. Freeman. The Chicago Tribune took over running the award in 1986, and it was presented annually until 2020, when it was presented in partnership with the Robert R. McCormick Foundation. In that year, there was one grand prize of $3,500, and five finalists were awarded $750 each. The award was suspended in 2021 for review.

Recipients of the award include Louise Erdrich (1982), Stuart Dybek (1985), Geoffrey Becker (1989), Kim Edwards (1990), Emily Raboteau (2001), Jeremy T. Wilson (2012), Brenda Peynado (2015), and Edward Hamlin (2020).

== Bibliography ==
=== Novels ===
- Somebody in Boots. 1935; as The Jungle, Avon, 1957.
- Never Come Morning. New York: Harper & Brothers, 1942; Four Walls Eight Windows, 1987; Seven Stories, 1996.
- The Man with the Golden Arm. Doubleday, 1949; Seven Stories, 1996.
- A Walk on the Wild Side. 1956.
- The Devil's Stocking. New York: Arbor House, 1983; Seven Stories, 2006.

=== Short-story collections ===
- The Neon Wilderness. New York: Doubleday, 1947; Four Walls Eight Windows, 1986.
- Nelson Algren's Own Book of Lonesome Monsters: 13 Masterpieces of Black Humor. Algren-edited anthology with one Algren story. 1962.
- The Last Carousel. New York: G. P. Putnam's Sons 1973; Seven Stories Press, 1997.
- He Swung and He Missed. Short story for younger readers. 1993.
- The Texas Stories of Nelson Algren. 1994.
- Entrapment and Other Writings. Posthumous collection of fragments of the unfinished titular novel, uncollected stories, and poems. New York: Seven Stories, 2009.

=== Nonfiction ===
- Galena Guide. The City of Galena, Illinois. 1937.
- Chicago: City on the Make. Prose Poem. 1951.
- Who Lost an American?. Travel book. 1963; in Notes From a Sea Diary & Who Lost an American, Seven Stories, 2009.
- Conversations with Nelson Algren. Interviews by H. E. F. Donohue. 1964.
- Notes from a Sea Diary: Hemingway All the Way. Travel book. 1965; in Notes From a Sea Diary & Who Lost an American, Seven Stories, 2009.
- America Eats. Travel book. 1992 (written 1930s).
- Nonconformity: Writing on Writing. Essay. 1996 (written 1951–1953).
