= Art Shay =

American photographer and writer

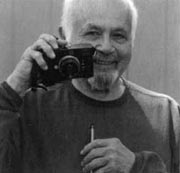
- Born: March 31, 1922; Bronx, New York, U.S.
- Died: April 28, 2018 (aged 96); Deerfield, Illinois, U.S.
- Notable work: Nelson Algren's Chicago, Couples, Animals

Art Shay (March 31, 1922 – April 28, 2018) was an American photographer and writer.

== Biography ==
Born in 1922, Shay grew up in the Bronx and then served as a navigator in the U.S. Army Air Forces in World War II, during which he flew 52 bomber missions. Shay joined the staff of Life magazine as a writer, and quickly became a Chicago-based freelance photographer for Life, Time, Sports Illustrated, and other national publications. He photographed seven US Presidents and many major figures of the 20th century. Shay also wrote weekly columns for various newspapers, several plays, children's books, sports instruction books and several photo essay books. Shay's photography is sold at galleries and is in permanent collections of major museums including the National Portrait Gallery and The Art Institute of Chicago. Shay's long friendship with the writer Nelson Algren led to the publication of Shay's Nelson Algren's Chicago. Shay and Algren met in 1949 and collaborated on many projects, including photos and an essay for Holiday Magazine that Algren later turned into his book Chicago: City on the Make. Shay took well-known pictures of Simone de Beauvoir (nude and portrait) when she visited Chicago to be with Algren. Shay wrote a play about Algren's triangle relationship with de Beauvoir and Jean-Paul Sartre, which had a stage reading in Chicago in 1999. Another collection of Shay's work with Nelson Algren is featured in Shay's 2007 Book Chicago's Nelson Algren published by Seven Stories Press. The 2014 documentary by Montrose Pictures, Algren -The Movie, featured over 100 new Algren images from Shay's collection.

Shay published more than 75 books on various subjects. In the late 1960s and early 1970s, he wrote two series of photography illustrated children's books published by Reilly & Lee. Shay's What It's Like to Be A ... series of books explained various occupations including a doctor, fireman, pilot, policeman, nurse, teacher, dentist, musician, and a TV producer. Shay's What Happens ... series of books explained concepts such as what happens when you build a house, spend money, turn on a light, and turn on the gas. Other books in Shay's "What Happens ..." series included what happens at the zoo, at a gas station, at a newspaper, at an animal hospital, at the circus, in a skyscraper, at the state fair, and at a weather station. In 2002, The University of Illinois Press published Shay's photographic essays, Animals and, in 2003, Couples.

Shay's comedy titled A Clock for Nikita was produced and ran at the Stagelight Theater in Buffalo Grove, Illinois, from April 7 to May 3, 1964. His 2000 autobiography is titled Album for an Age: Unconventional Words and Pictures from the 20th Century. In 2002, the American Theater Company in Chicago staged Shay's autobiographical play, Where Have You Gone, Jimmy Stewart?, directed by Mike Nussbaum.

In 2007, Shay had his first major retrospective of his black and white photographs which ran for six months at the Chicago History Museum: "The Essential Art Shay: Selected Photographs." In 2008, The Museum of Contemporary Art, Chicago held an exhibit of photographs titled Art Shay: Chicago Accent which included pieces from between 1949 and 1968 of Shay's work while working with Algren of Chicago's "underclass."

In 2010, Chicago's Thomas Master's Gallery featured Shay's first show of exclusively color photography titled "Art Shay: True Colors." In 2012, Shay was inducted into the National Racquetball Hall of Fame.

Since the opening in 1976 of Northbrook Court Mall in Northbrook, Illinois, Shay chronicled life at the mall. He also worked on a project on the life of The Smashing Pumpkins' Billy Corgan. Since the end of 2010, Shay wrote a weekly photography blog "From the Vault of Art Shay" on Chicagoist.

On February 2, 2015, Seven Stories Press published Shay's final book, My Florence, a picture book chronicling his late wife Florence's life in 20th-century Chicago.

Shay died in April 2018, at the age of 96, in Deerfield, Illinois, from heart failure.

== Bibliography ==
- My Florence (New York: Seven Stories Press, 2015).
