= Chicago: City on the Make =

1951 essay by Nelson Algren

First edition (publ. Doubleday)

Chicago: City on the Make is a book-length essay by Nelson Algren published in 1951.

== Background ==
Initially greeted with scorn by critics and newspaper editors in the city of its gaze (The Chicago Daily News famously called it a "Case for Ra(n)t Control"), it is now widely regarded by scholars as a definitive prose portrait of the city of Chicago, although it has never rivaled the literary status of Carl Sandburg's 1916 poem "Chicago". Algren leans heavily on the imagery and themes developed by Sandburg, to whom Algren dedicated the book. Subsequent portraits of Chicago, such as Studs Terkel's 1985 Chicago, have likewise drawn heavily upon Algren's work.

== Synopsis ==
In the 12,000-word lyrical essay, Algren summarizes 120 years of Chicago history as a tangle of hustlers, gangsters, and corrupt politicians, but he ultimately declares his love for the city with these famous lines from Chapter 2: "It's every man for himself in this hired air. / Yet once you've come to be part of this particular patch, you'll never love another. Like loving a woman with a broken nose, you may well find lovelier lovelies. But never a lovely so real." Algren locates the city's heart in the "nobodies nobody knows," the ginsoaks, stew bums, and shell-shocked veterans who lurk in the alleys and linger in the weedy wastes underneath the 'L' tracks. Unrivaled in its depiction of Chicago's downtrodden, the essay recounts the repeated ways Chicago sells out its dreams and disappoints its dreamers, including the 1919 Black Sox scandal, in which eight Chicago White Sox players were accused of accepting bribes to throw the world series. Indeed, Algren writes, the whole city has always been "a rigged ball game."

== Legacy ==
The University of Chicago Press issued a new edition of the essay upon its 50th anniversary in 2001, and it remains one of Chicago's most popular local books. Nostalgia for Chicago's colorful history may explain the essay's continued success. In a 2002 reassessment of the essay, University of Chicago scholar Jeff McMahon wrote, "Why does Algren's textual Chicago continue to resonate with Chicago readers today? In sentences that assess Algren's legacy as a Chicago writer — sentences in which Algren serves as subject, Chicago as object — one verb often recurs. As Mike Royko writes in 'Algren's Golden Pen,' Algren captures Chicago. From the discourse on this essay emerges the argument that the text contains some captured aspect of Chicago that still applies to the city today."
