= Dennis Wolkowicz =

Theater manager and organist from Chicago, Illinois

- Born: January 5, 1951; Chicago
- Died: February 24, 2025 (aged 74)
- Other name: Jay Warren
- Education: Gordon Tech High School
- Occupations: Theater manager, photoplay organist
- Years active: 1986-2025
- Website: https://www.silentfilmchicago.com/

Dennis Wolkowicz (January 5, 1951 - February 24, 2025) was a theater owner and photoplay organist active in Chicago, Illinois. He was the president and co-founder of the Silent Film Society of Chicago, and accompanied silent films on the organ under the stage name Jay Warren.

== Life ==
=== Early life ===
Wolkowicz grew up in a Polish American household in Irving Park, Chicago. Wolkowicz graduated from Gordon Tech High School and then joined the National Guard. While he was training to become a military police office in 1973, his father died, and Wolkowicz returned to Chicago to take over his family's butcher shop. After his mother died in 1985, Wolkowicz pursued a career in music, initially working as a salesman for Baldwin Piano Company.

=== Career ===
In 1986, Wolkowicz became the manager of the Gateway Theater, by then part of the Copernicus Center, a Polish-American cultural center. Wolkowicz began screening silent films at the Copernicus Center. Wolkowicz hired organists to accompany the silent films on a vintage pipe organ he had installed, and eventually filled this role himself. In 1988, Wolkowicz founded the Silent Film Society of Chicago, which screened films at the Gateway and Pickwick Theatre in Park Ridge, Illinois. In 2000, the Society held a Silent Summer Film Festival at the Gateway.

Wolkowicz ended his association with the Copernicus Center in 2004, and became the manager of the Portage Theater in 2006, restoring it and running it until 2014. In 2010, Wolkowicz led a campaign opposing the sale of the Portage to a church, due to the theater's role in revitalizing the Six Corners shopping district. Wolkowicz stayed on as theater manager when Congress Theater owner Eddie Carranza bought the Portage in 2013. Carranza had initially sought to evict Wolkowicz and his business partner Dave Dziedzic. Wolkowicz moved the Silent Film Festival to the Des Plaines Theatre in 2013. In 2014, it moved across the street to the Leela Arts Center. In 2016, it was announced that Wolkowicz would run the Patio Theater.

== Death and legacy ==
Wolkowicz died from a heart attack on February 24, 2025, aged 74. He was due to perform at City News Cafe in Six Corners a few hours after his death. In August 2026, the block of Milwaukee Avenue on which the Portage Theater is located was given the honorary name Jay Warren Way.
