= National Veterans Art Museum =

Art museum in Chicago, Illinois, US

- Established: 1980; at 1801 S. Indiana Avenue since 1995, moved 2012
- Location: 4041 N. Milwaukee Avenue; Chicago, US
- Coordinates: 41.954324°N 87.748769°W
- Public transit access: Irving Park (CTA), #80, #72, #56
- Website: www.nvam.org

The National Veterans Art Museum (formerly the National Vietnam Veterans Art Museum) in Portage Park, Chicago displays art produced by veterans from the Vietnam War and other wars and conflicts. Originally a traveling exhibition, while in Chicago it was viewed by Mayor Richard M. Daley, who was so taken by the power of the art that he immediately insisted that the city provide a permanent home for it.

== History ==
The National Veterans Art Museum is the result of efforts of the Vietnam Veterans Art Group, formed in 1981. The group built a following almost immediately after their first show, Vietnam: Reflexes and Reflections, which opened in October 1981. With increasing popularity and press, the Group grew; veterans from all over the United States began to send in work to be displayed. In 1996 the Vietnam Veterans Art Group established a museum, the only one of its kind at 1801 S. Indiana Ave in Chicago's South Loop, which has been repurposed as the fieldhouse of the Chicago Women's Park and Gardens. In 2012, the museum was relocated to Portage Park in Chicago's historic Six Corners neighborhood. The entrance hall hosted Above and Beyond by Zachary Keltner, displaying 58,226 dog tags hanging from the ceiling, representing the US soldiers who died in Vietnam. Above and Beyond by Zachary Keltner was exhibited for nearly 10 years at Harold Washington Library Center and deinstalled December 2025. The museum started with 700 Vietnam War-era works, and contains over 2,500 pieces from artists who served in WWII, the Korean War, the Gulf War, and the Global War on Terror.

== Mission ==
The museum's mission is to inspire greater understanding of the impact of war through the collection, preservation, and exhibition of art created by veterans of all U.S. military conflicts. The museum displays military and artistic heritage, helping civilians and veterans make connections across diverse ranges of experience. With nearly 2,500 works of art by more than 250 artists, the museum offers visitors of all ages and backgrounds insight into war from the viewpoint of people who were physically and emotionally involved in military conflicts. In addition, the museum provides an artistic outlet for veterans to work through and express their combat and military service experiences.
