= Des Plaines Theatre =

Theater in Des Plaines, Illinois

- Des Plaines Theatre in 2026

General information
- Architectural style: Art Deco
- Location: 1476 Miner St., Des Plaines, Illinois, United States of America
- Opened: August 9, 1925
- Owner: City of Des Plaines, Onesti Entertainment

Design and construction
- Architect: William Betts
- Architecture firm: Betts & Holcomb

Renovating team
- Architects: Pereira & Pereira

Other information
- Seating capacity: 998

Website
- https://desplainestheatre.com/

The Des Plaines Theatre is a theater located in Des Plaines, Illinois.

== History ==
=== 20th century ===
The Des Plaines Theatre opened on August 9, 1925 in Des Plaines, Illinois, which was then still semi-rural. The Des Plaines is one of nine theaters built by brothers Paul, Otto, and Martin Polka, along with the Pickwick Theatre in nearby Park Ridge, Illinois. The Des Plaines Theatre was designed by William Betts of the firm Betts & Holcomb. A bomb exploded behind the theater in the summer of 1932, causing minor damage. In 1935, Balaban and Katz bought the theatre and had it renovated by the firm Pereira & Pereira, who added an electric marquee. The theater reopened in November of that year. In March 1982, a fire in the basement of the theater caused $500,000 worth of damage, causing it to close for a bout a year. The theater was divided into two smaller theaters before reopening.

=== 21st century ===
The Des Plaines Theater Preservation Society was formed in 2003 in response to plans to sell the building to Mt. Prospect National Bank. The society filed a petition to grant the theater landmark status in order to prevent the bank from demolishing it. Des Plaines businessman Dhitu Bhagwakar purchased theater from the bank that same year, and screened Bollywood films. Bhagwakar began renovations in 2010 aiming to convert the building into a venue for live performances in addition to film screenings. In 2013, the roof of the theater collapsed onto the stage, and the theater was closed for five months to repair the damage. That summer, the Silent Film Festival of Chicago was hosted at the Des Plaines Theatre. In January 2014, the City of Des Plaines ordered the theater closed after Bhagwakar failed to meet a deadline to address building code issues.

In 2018 the City of Des Plaines bought the building for $1.8 million dollars. Ron Onesti, owner of the Arcada Theater Building in St. Charles, Illinois, became the operator of the Des Plaines Theater, which reopened on October 31, 2021, with a performance by Kevin Costner. The city funded the renovation, with Onesti leasing the building. Des Plaines-based Rivers Casino contributed $2.2 million to the $6.6 million restoration. Onesti remodeled the theater, adding a bar on the second floor, and a pizzeria in the lobby.

==== Controversy ====
In January of 2023, the Des Plaines Theatre canceled a planned event organized by Awake Illinois, a group that opposes gender identity and sexual orientation education in schools, medical treatments for transgender youth, and drag shows. Although Onesti had stated he would not cancel the event, he stated that people opposed to the event threatened to mail him bullets and fill his garbage cans with dog feces. Des Plaines city council members were divided on whether the event should take place, with some considering it inappropriate for the city-owned venue, and others considering it a matter of free speech. Mayor of Des Plaines, Andrew Goczkowski stated that the city could not demand that Onesti cancel the event, but "there's no place for politics in a building that's publicly owned," and promised to speak with Onesti about what kinds of events the theater should host.

== See also ==
- Arcada Theater Building
- Pickwick Theatre
- Copernicus Center
- Portage Theater
- Patio Theater
