= Chopin Park =

Park in Chicago, Illinois, United States

Coordinates: 41.9432°N 87.7630°W

- Chopin Park fieldhouse in 2026.
- Interactive map of Chopin Park
- Location: Chicago, Illinois

Chopin Park is an 8-acre (32,000 m^{2}) park located at 3420 North Long in the Portage Park community area of North Side, Chicago, Illinois.

The park stretches from Roscoe Street on the south to Cornelia Avenue to the north between Linder and Long avenues. The historic fieldhouse was designed by Albert A. Schwartz and contains an assembly hall with a stage and seven rooms, where many preschool and music classes take place. The park also offers a Park Kids after-school program that attracts local students.

Chopin Park is named after Frédéric Chopin, Poland's most famous pianist and composer. Portage Park has the largest Polish community in the Chicago Metropolitan Area according to the 2000 census. The area is the center of one of Chicago's "Polish Patches", Władysławowo, and the park is right across the street from St. Ladislaus Roman Catholic Church.

There are/were plans to erect a statue of Frédéric Chopin in Chopin Park for the 200th anniversary of Chopin's birth in 2010.

There are also plans to erect, along Chicago's lakefront, a full-scale replica of Wacław Szymanowski's Chopin Statue in Warsaw's Royal Baths Park.

== See also ==
- Memorials to Frédéric Chopin
- North Side of Chicago
