= Portage Theater =

Theater in Portage Park, Chicago

- Portage Park Theater
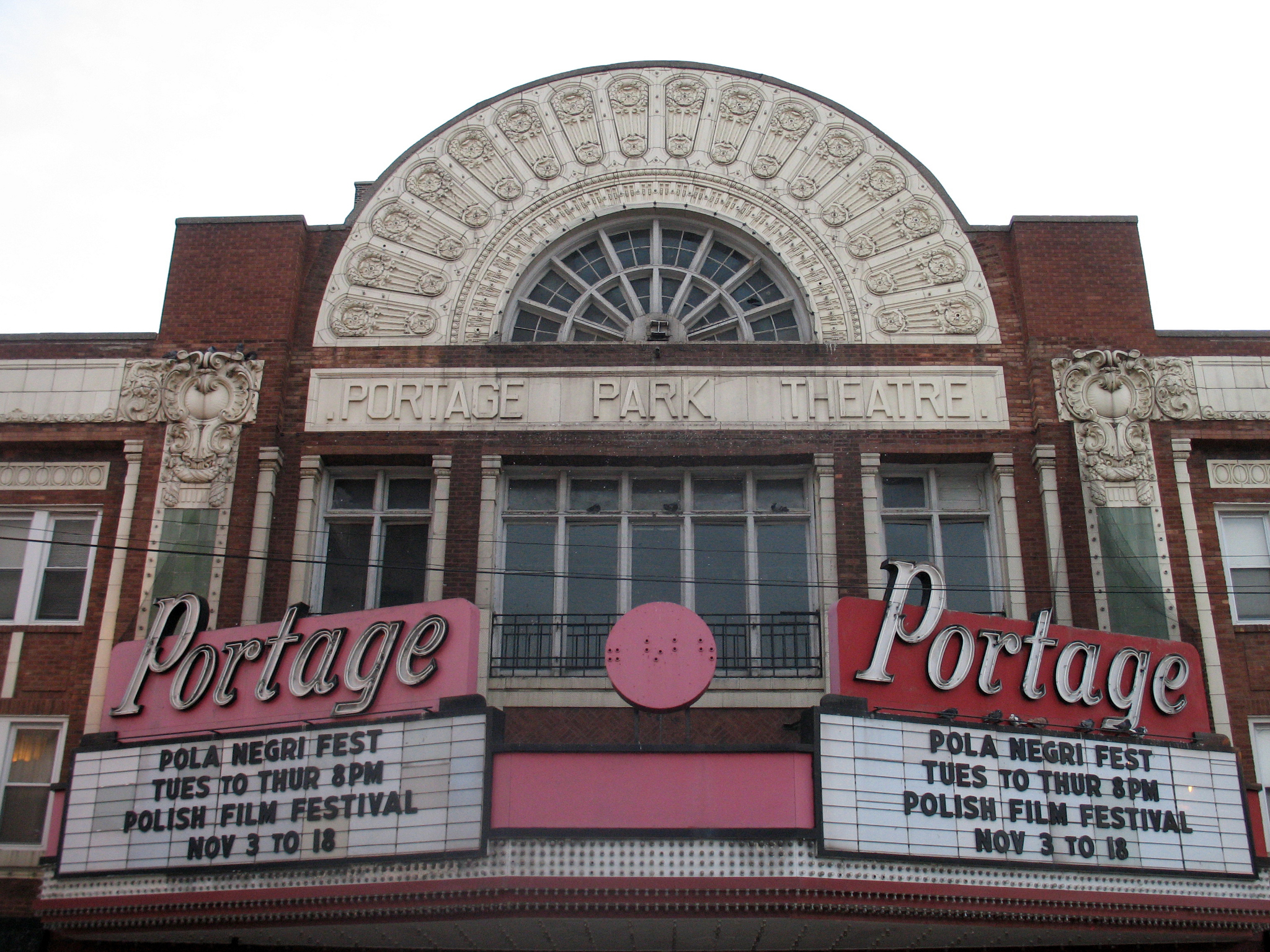
- Portage Theater
- Interactive map of Portage Theater
- Address: 4050 North Milwaukee Avenue; Chicago, Illinois 60641; United States
- Coordinates: 41.954192°N 87.748371°W
- Capacity: 2250
- Type: Performing Arts Center

Construction
- Opened: December 11, 1920
- Closed: 2001
- Reopened: 2006
- Architect: Lindley Phelps Rowe

Located at Six Corners in the Portage Park neighborhood of Chicago's Northwest Side, the Portage Theater is one of the oldest movie houses in Chicago. The Portage Theater opened on December 11, 1920, as the Portage Park Theatre (the former name is still visible on the building's facade). Built for the Ascher Brothers circuit with 1,938 seats, the Portage was the first theater built specifically for film (and not vaudeville) in the area. The Portage Theater was designated a Chicago landmark in 2013.

== History ==
The Portage Theater's interior features a megaphone-shaped auditorium based on a formal Beaux-Arts opera house design. When the theater was taken over by Balaban and Katz in 1940, its marquee, entrance lobby and foyer were redecorated in a streamlined art deco style similar to other prominent art deco designs at Six Corners such as Sears department store and the Klee Brothers building.

The Portage became a second-run movie house in the 1960s. In 1975, the Portage Theater was renamed the Portage Palace and briefly served as a venue for live performances by country music acts, with Conway Twitty becoming the first to play there on May 9, 1975. In the 1980s, a wall dividing the auditorium was constructed to create two smaller theaters. The Portage was closed in 2001 after years of sporadic operation. The theater was restored and renovated, and reopened after a five-year hiatus in the spring of 2006 as a single-screen, 1300-plus seat theater showing both silent and sound classic motion pictures, as well as hosting other live events.

The Portage Theater closed once again on May 25, 2013, further reopening in June 2014. The theater closed once again in February 2018. The theater was taken over by the operator of the nearby Patio Theater in March 2025, with plans to reopen as a community space. Renovations began in April 2026. The Portage Theater was made a Chicago Landmark in 2013.

== In popular culture ==
In the film Public Enemies, based on the life of 1930s bank robber John Dillinger the interior of the Portage was used as a stand-in for interior shots of the Biograph Theater on Lincoln Avenue, where Dillinger was killed by FBI agents upon exiting the theater in 1934.

== See also ==
- Patio Theater
- Copernicus Center
- Des Plaines Theatre
- Pickwick Theatre
