= Jay Warren (disambiguation) =

Wikimedia disambiguation

Jay Warren may refer to:

- Jay Warren, politician from Pitcairn Islands
- Jay Warren (footballer), Tahitian footballer
- The stage name of Dennis Wolkowicz, a Chicago-based photoplay organist and theater manager
