= Chicago Women's Park and Gardens =

Sculpture garden in Chicago, Illinois, United States

Coordinates: 41°51′26″N 87°37′18″W

Chicago Women's Park and Gardens is a 3.23 acre public sculpture garden in South Loop that honors the contributions of women throughout the history of Chicago. Landscape architect Mimi McKay and architect Tannys Langdon designed the space. Its "Helping Hands" sculpture by Louise Bourgeois honors Jane Addams. Its fieldhouse was formerly the National Vietnam Veteran’s Art Museum until the museum was relocated to Portage Park.

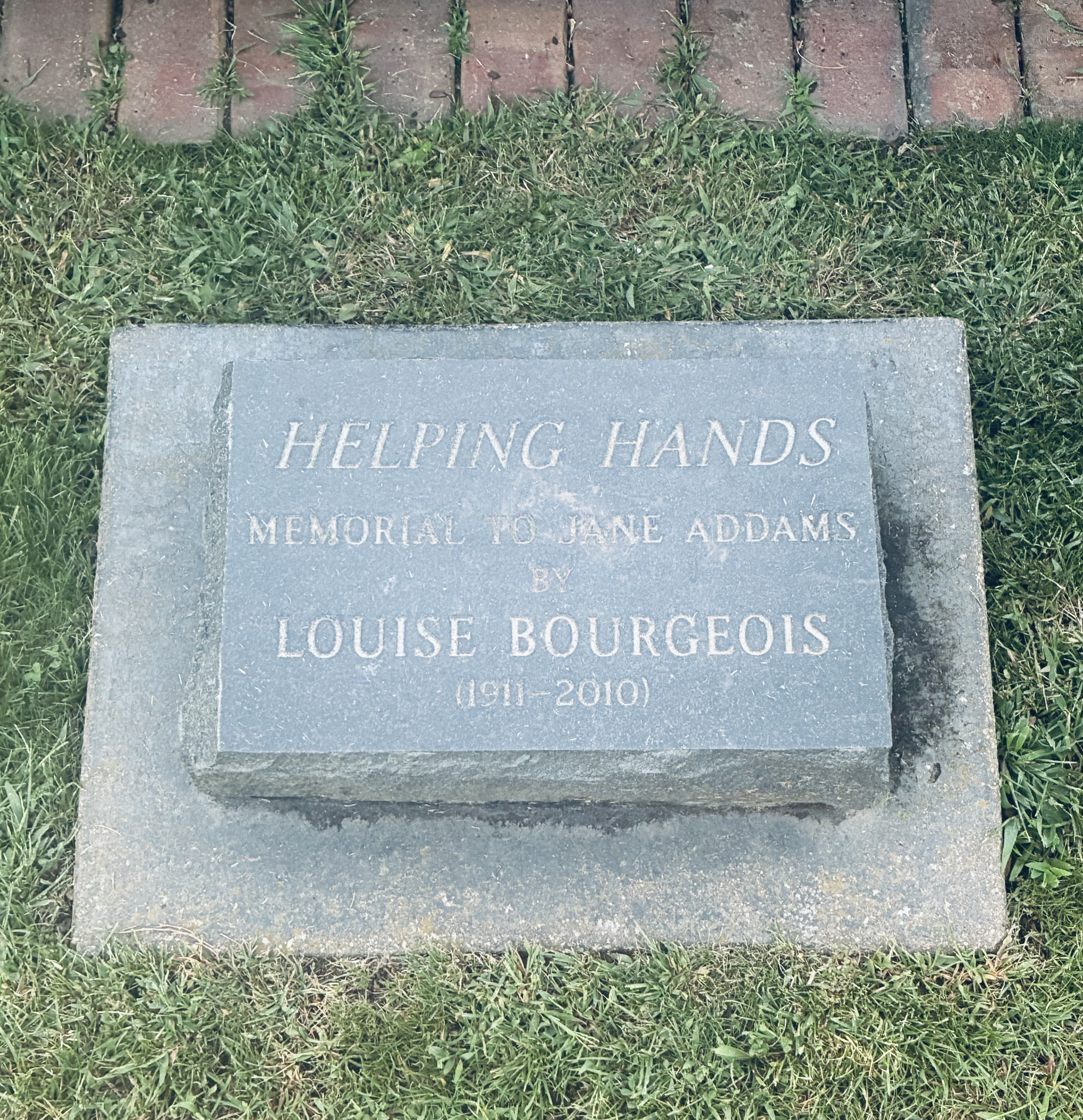
Helping Hands by Louise Bourgeois plaque

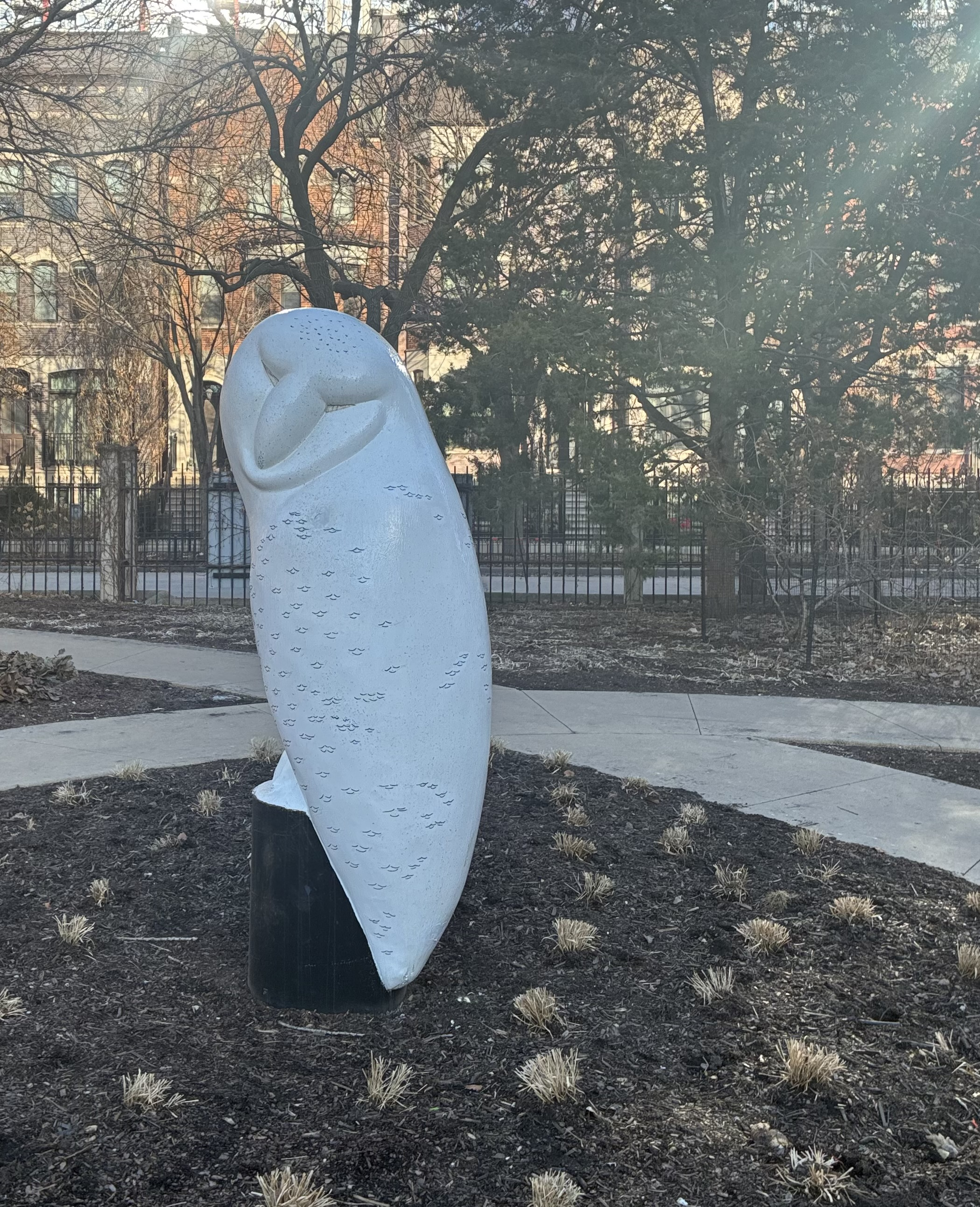
Owl sculpture in winter

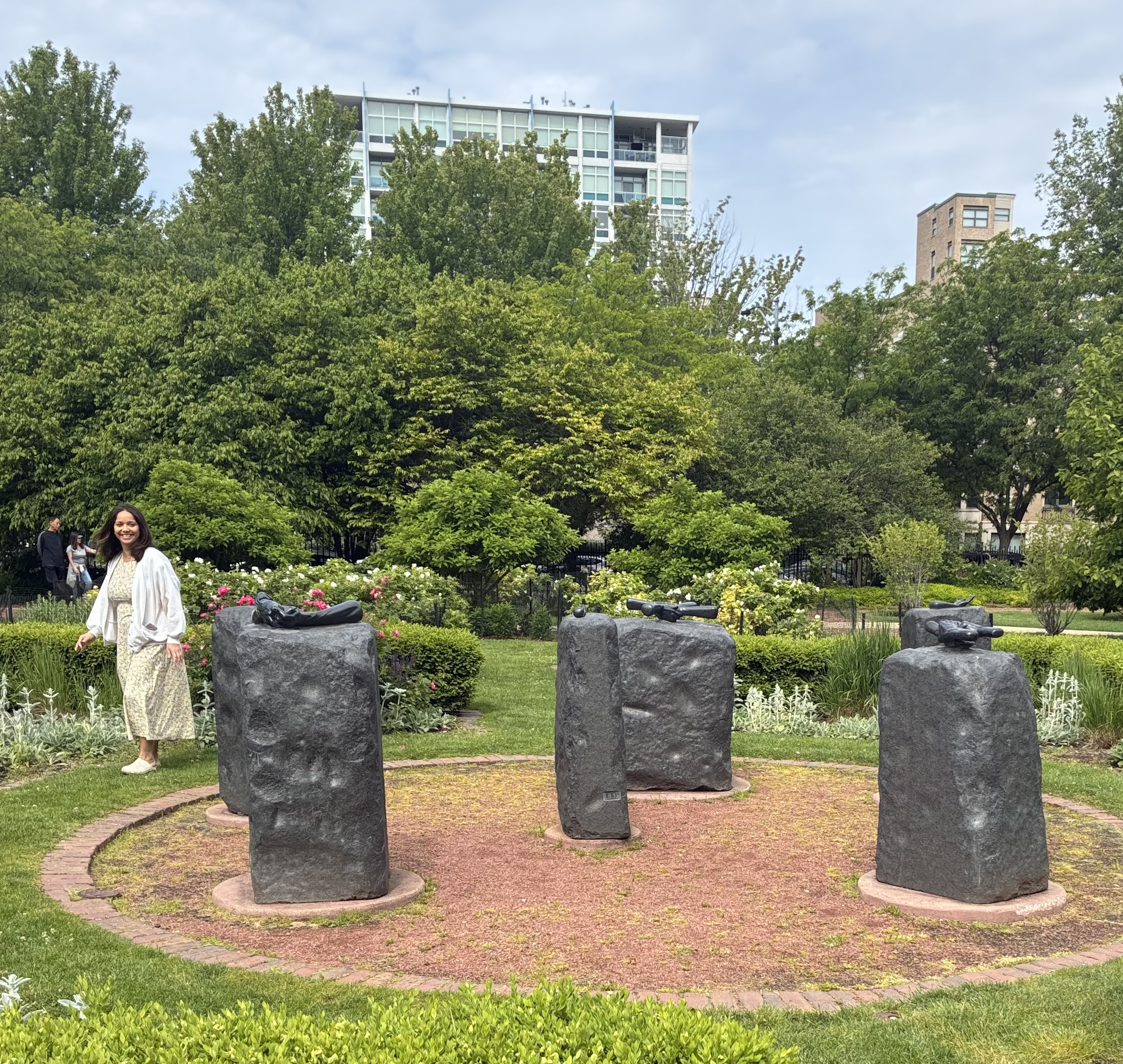
Helping Hands sculpture by Louise Bourgeois

== See also ==
- List of parks in Chicago
- List of sculpture parks
- Chicago park and boulevard system
- List of artworks by Louise Bourgeois
