= St. Ladislaus Roman Catholic Church (Chicago) =

Coordinates: 41°56′30″N 87°45′40.8″W

St. Ladislaus Church
- St. Ladislaus in 2026
- St. Ladislaus; Church
- Location: Chicago
- Country: United States
- Denomination: Roman Catholic
- Website: St. Ladislaus's Parish

History
- Founded: 1914
- Dedication: St. Ladislaus
- Dedicated: August 29, 1915

Architecture
- Functional status: Active
- Heritage designation: For Polish immigrants
- Architect: Leo Strelka
- Architectural type: Church
- Style: Romanesque Revival
- Groundbreaking: November 17, 1952
- Completed: June 12, 1955

Specifications
- Materials: Brick

St. Ladislaus (Polish: Kościół Świętego Władysława) is a historic church of the Roman Catholic Archdiocese of Chicago located in Chicago, Illinois.

Built in 1955, St. Ladislaus Roman Catholic Church is a prominent Polish parish on Chicago's Northwest Side. Its establishment in 1914 helped drive residential settlement and commercial development in the Portage Park neighborhood.

== History ==
St. Ladislaus was founded in 1914 as a Polish parish in a still rural area that had been annexed to the city in 1889 in advance of the World's Columbian Exposition. The Polish term for the surrounding area, Władysławowo derives from the Polish name for the church's patron, St. Ladislaus. Originally a mission of St. Wenceslaus, the first church, a combination church and school building, was already in place by August 1915. The parish numbered about 100 families in 1920. The parish was key in spurring growth in the Portage Park area as it drew in Polish immigrants from the tenements west of the city center concentrated in the Polish Downtown area of West Town. Nearby Chopin Park stands as a testament to this, named after Poland's most famous pianist and composer of the infamous Funeral March. With this development, the original pastor's residence above the Hupka (now Kopec) Funeral Chapel at 5259 W. Roscoe at the time of the building of the first church gave way to the parish plant typical of Polish parishes in the Chicago area, as first the school was enlarged and a convent as well as a rectory were bought. The cost of all these improvements totalled nearly $76,000.

Rapid growth of the Portage Park area had led to rapid growth of St. Ladislaus in the same way the parish served as a magnet for this development. By the time St. Ladislaus celebrated its silver jubilee, the parish had paid off all its debt, and a building fund for the new church had already been started. However construction was delayed by the outbreak of World War II. Finally, on November 17, 1952, ground was broken for the church at the northwest corner of Long and Henderson. The cornerstone was laid on April 12, 1953, and the imposing brick edifice was opened on June 12, 1955, for its first Mass. Today the parish numbers about 1500 families and still retains its original Polish character.

== Architecture ==
The church was designed by the firm of Leo Strelka who designed Providence of God in Pilsen and St. Bronislava on Chicago's Southeast Side The church, not completed until 1955 is a simplified Romanesque brick building, notable for its traditional design at a time when Modernism dominated sacred architecture. The church's interior decoration is austere in comparison with the rich ornament of Chicago's more well-known Polish Cathedrals. The church has a barrel-vault ceiling, marble pulpit, baptismal font, altars and statues, as well as a pipe organ once used at St. Helen Parish. The communion rail is also constructed of marble with gates cast in bronze. There are two side altars, one dedicated to Saint Joseph, and the other to the Immaculate Conception of the Virgin Mary as well as shrines to the Sacred Heart and to Our Lady of Sorrows. The rose window is considered the church's finest treasure and washes the interior of the church in a sea of light along with a series of 14 large and 14 smaller stained glass windows flanking the nave. The front's façade is dominated by a central niche with a sculpture of Saint Ladislaus looming over the building's main entrance, while a bas-relief representation of the Lamb of God rests above the main doorway.

The new millennium was an occasion for the church to initiate a campaign to conduct needed renovation to the church, including repairing the campanile, repaving the parking lot and make other improvements.

== Church in architecture books ==
- Sinkevitch, Alice (2004). The AIA Guide to Chicago. Harvest Books.
- Schulze, Franz; Harrington, Kevin (2003). Chicago's Famous Buildings. University Of Chicago Press.
- McNamara, Denis R. (2005). Heavenly City: The Architectural Tradition of Catholic Chicago. Liturgy Training Publications.
- Chiat, Marylin (2004). The Spiritual Traveler: Chicago and Illinois: A Guide to Sacred Sites and Peaceful Places. HiddenSpring.
- Lane, George A. (1982). Chicago Churches and Synagogues: An Architectural Pilgrimage. Loyola Press.
- Kantowicz, Edward R. (2007). The Archdiocese of Chicago: A Journey of Faith. Booklink.
- Kociolek, Jacek (2002). Kościoły Polskie w Chicago {Polish Churches of Chicago} (in Polish). Ex Libris.

== See also ==
- Polish Cathedral style churches of Chicago
- Polish Americans
- Roman Catholicism in Poland
