= Statue of Frédéric Chopin (Warsaw) =

Bronze statue of Frédéric Chopin in Warsaw, Poland

Coordinates: 52°12′53″N 21°01′41″E

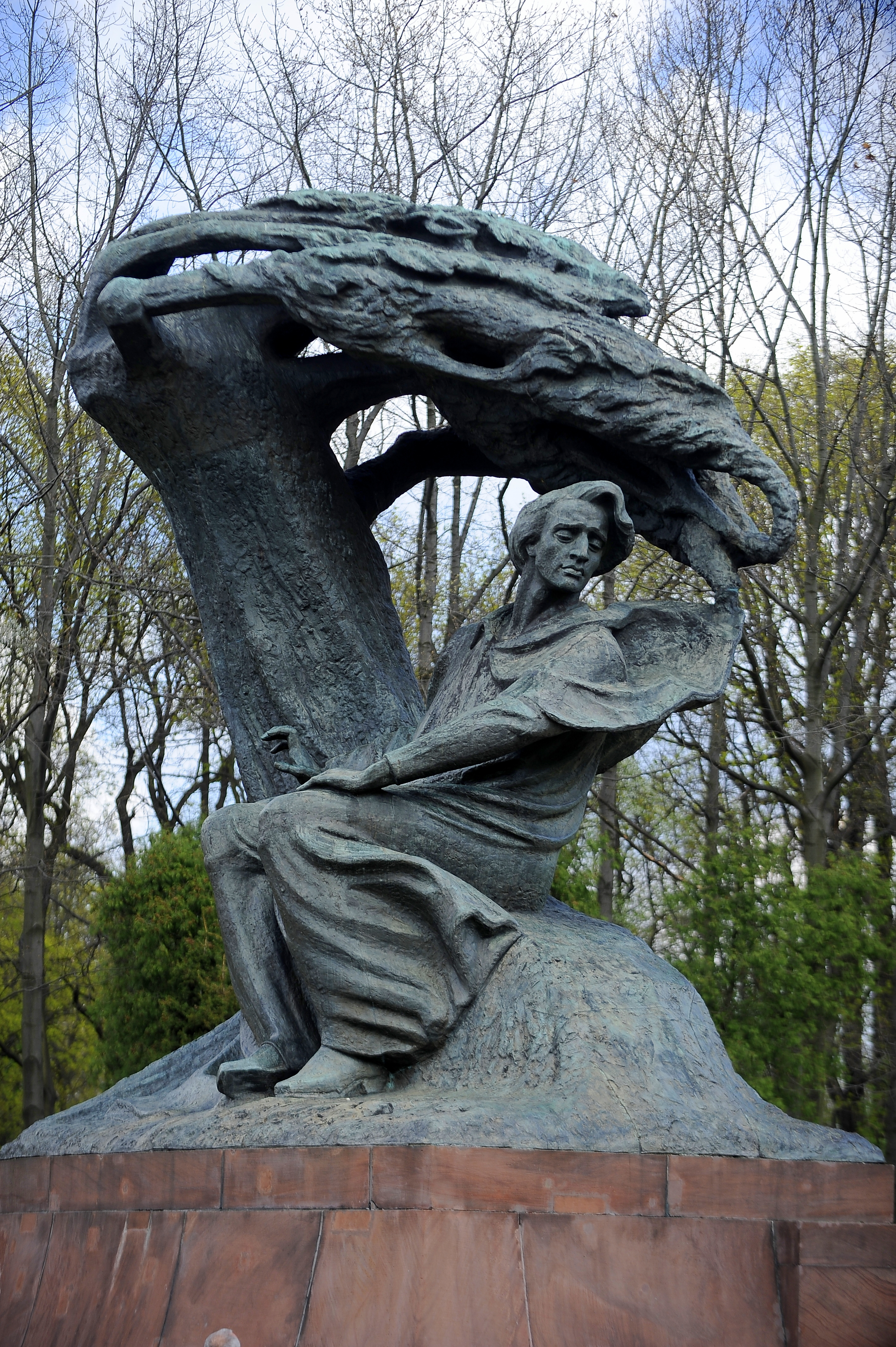
- Frédéric Chopin Monument in Warsaw
- Interactive map of Statue of Frédéric Chopin
- Location: Warsaw, Poland
- Designer: Wacław Szymanowski
- Material: bronze
- Beginning date: 1909
- Completion date: 1926
- Opening date: 14 November 1926; 11May 1958
- Dedicated to: Frédéric Chopin

Historic Monument of Poland
- Designated: 1994-09-08
- Part of: Warsaw – historic city center with the Royal Route and Wilanów
- Reference no.: M.P. 1994 nr 50 poz. 423

The statue of Frédéric Chopin (Polish: Pomnik Fryderyka Chopina) is a large bronze statue of Frédéric Chopin (1810–1849), designed by Wacław Szymanowski, that stands in the upper part of Warsaw's Royal Baths Park (also known as Łazienki Park), adjacent to Aleje Ujazdowskie (Ujazdów Avenue).

== History ==
It was designed in 1907 by Wacław Szymanowski for its planned erection on the centenary of Chopin's birth in 1810 but its execution was delayed by controversy about the design, then by the outbreak of World War I. The statue was finally cast and erected in 1926. The members of the jury who selected the winning project included such figures as Antoine Bourdelle, Józef Pius Dziekoński and Leopold Méyet.

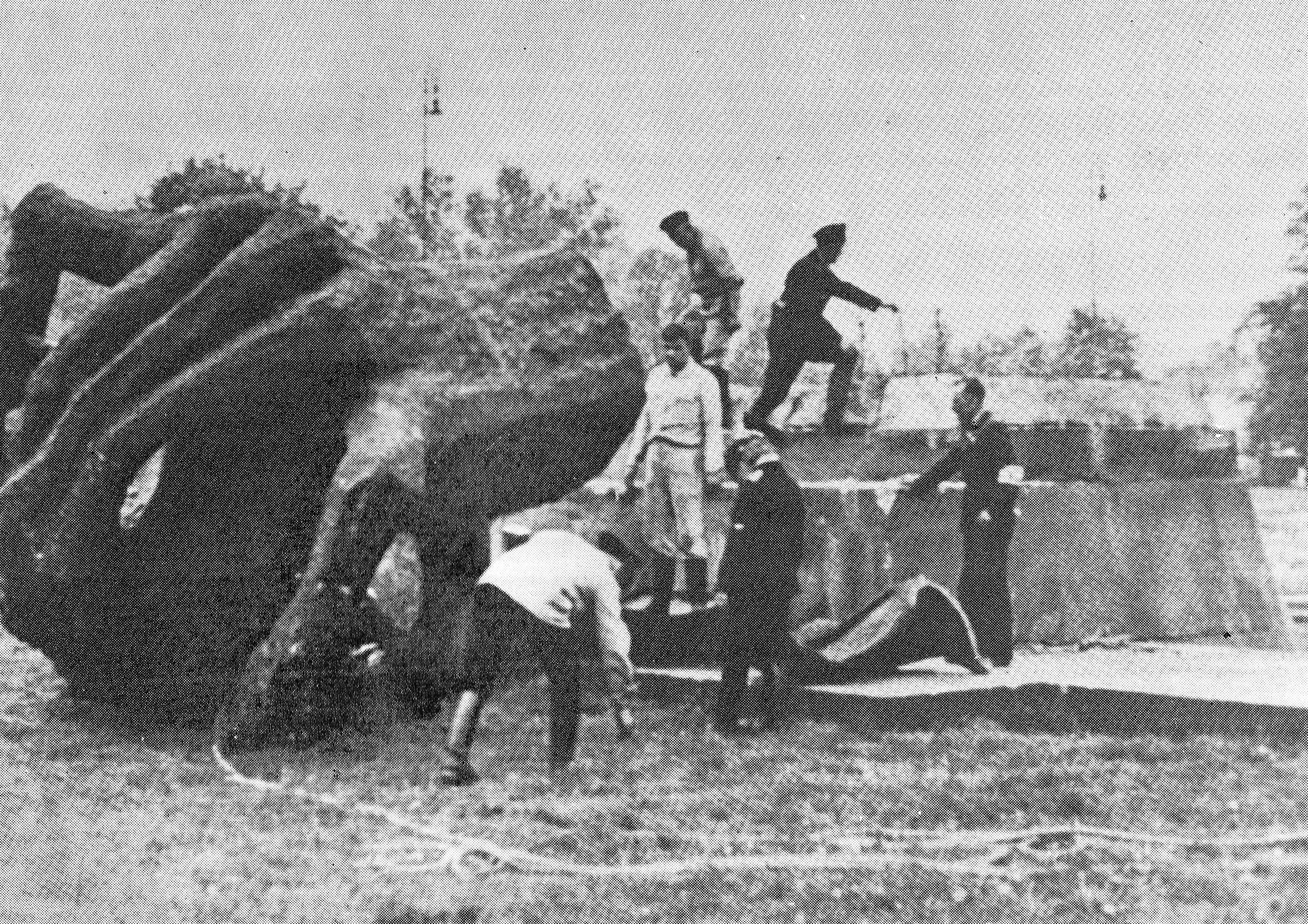
Statue destroyed by the Germans (1940)

The statue was blown up on 31 May 1940, during World War II, on the order of Governor-General Hans Frank and was the first monument destroyed by the occupying Germans in Warsaw. According to local legend, the next day a handwritten sign was found at the site which read: "I don’t know who destroyed me, but I know why: so that I won’t play the funeral march for your leader."

After the end of the war, the monument was rebuilt. Architect Oskar Sosnowski designed the pedestal and basin, which are made of red Wąchock sandstone. The inscription on the pedestal reads: "The Statue of Fryderyk Chopin, destroyed and plundered by the Germans on 31 May 1940, rebuilt by the Nation. 17 October 1946." Another inscription engraved on the monument is a quote from Adam Mickiewicz's narrative poem Konrad Wallenrod: "Flames will consume our painted history, sword-wielding thieves will plunder our treasures, the song will be saved..."

The original mould for the statue, which had survived the war, made it possible to cast a replica, which was placed at the original site in 1958. Since 1959, free piano recitals of Chopin's compositions have been performed at the statue's base on summer Sunday afternoons.

The stylized willow over Chopin's seated figure echoes a pianist's hand and fingers, and the Polish eagle's head on the right end.

A 1:1-scale replica of Szymanowski's statue stands in Hamamatsu, Japan. There are also preliminary plans to erect another replica along Chicago's lakefront, in addition to a different sculpture commemorating the artist in Chopin Park.

Szymanowski's statue was the world's tallest Chopin monument until the unveiling, on 3 March 2007, of a slightly taller, modernistic bronze in Shanghai, China.

== Gallery ==
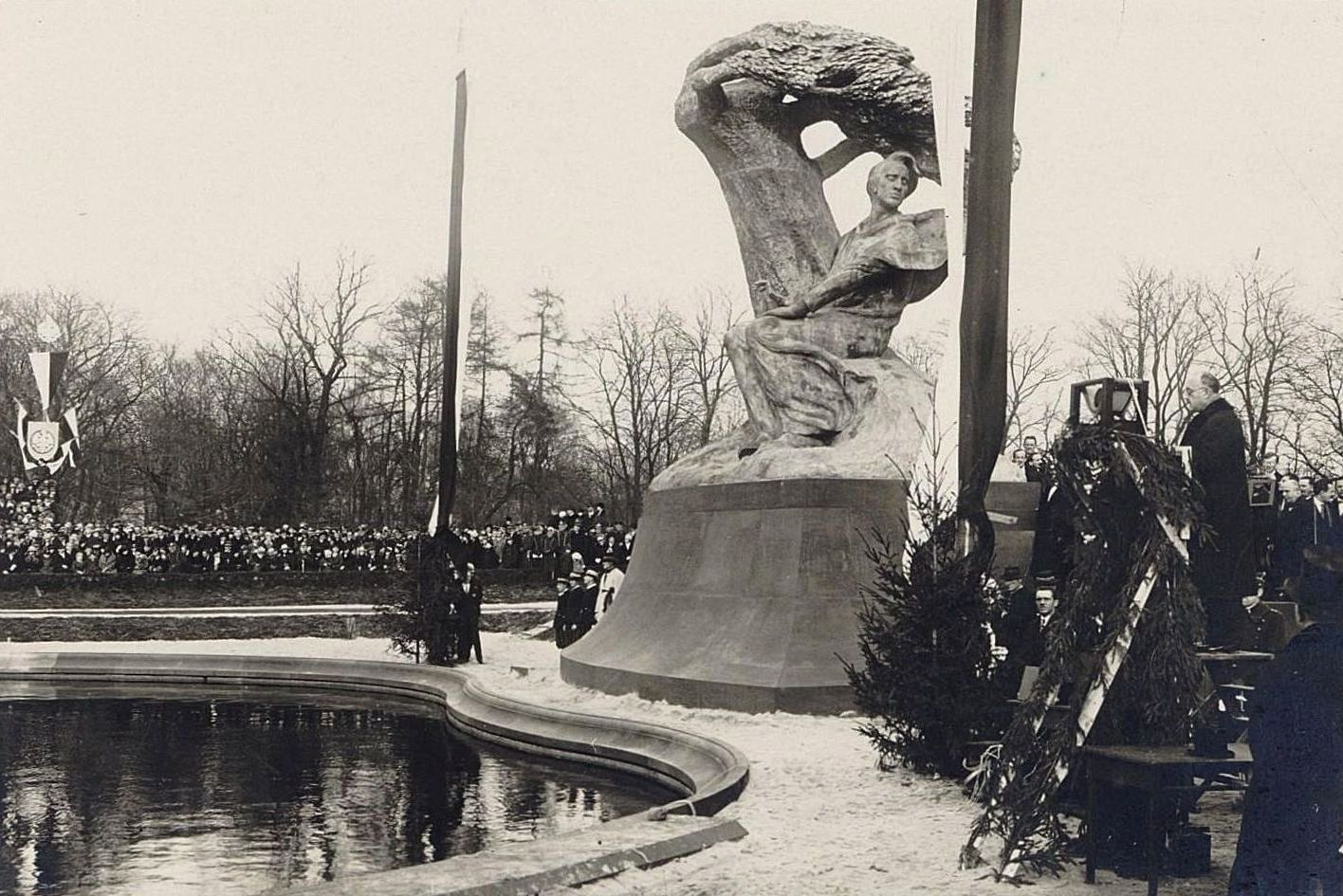
Opening ceremony, 1926

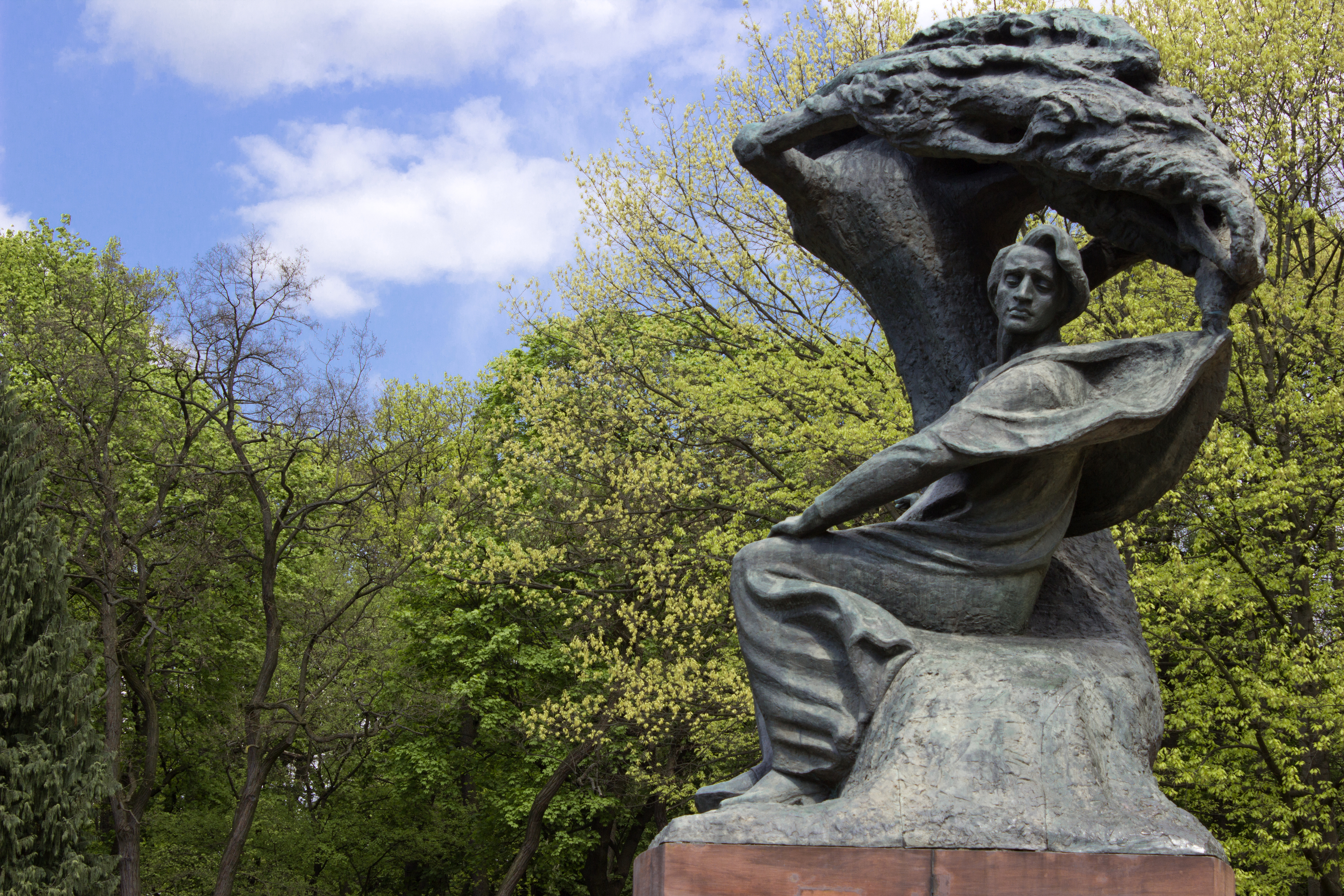
Chopin Statue in Warsaw

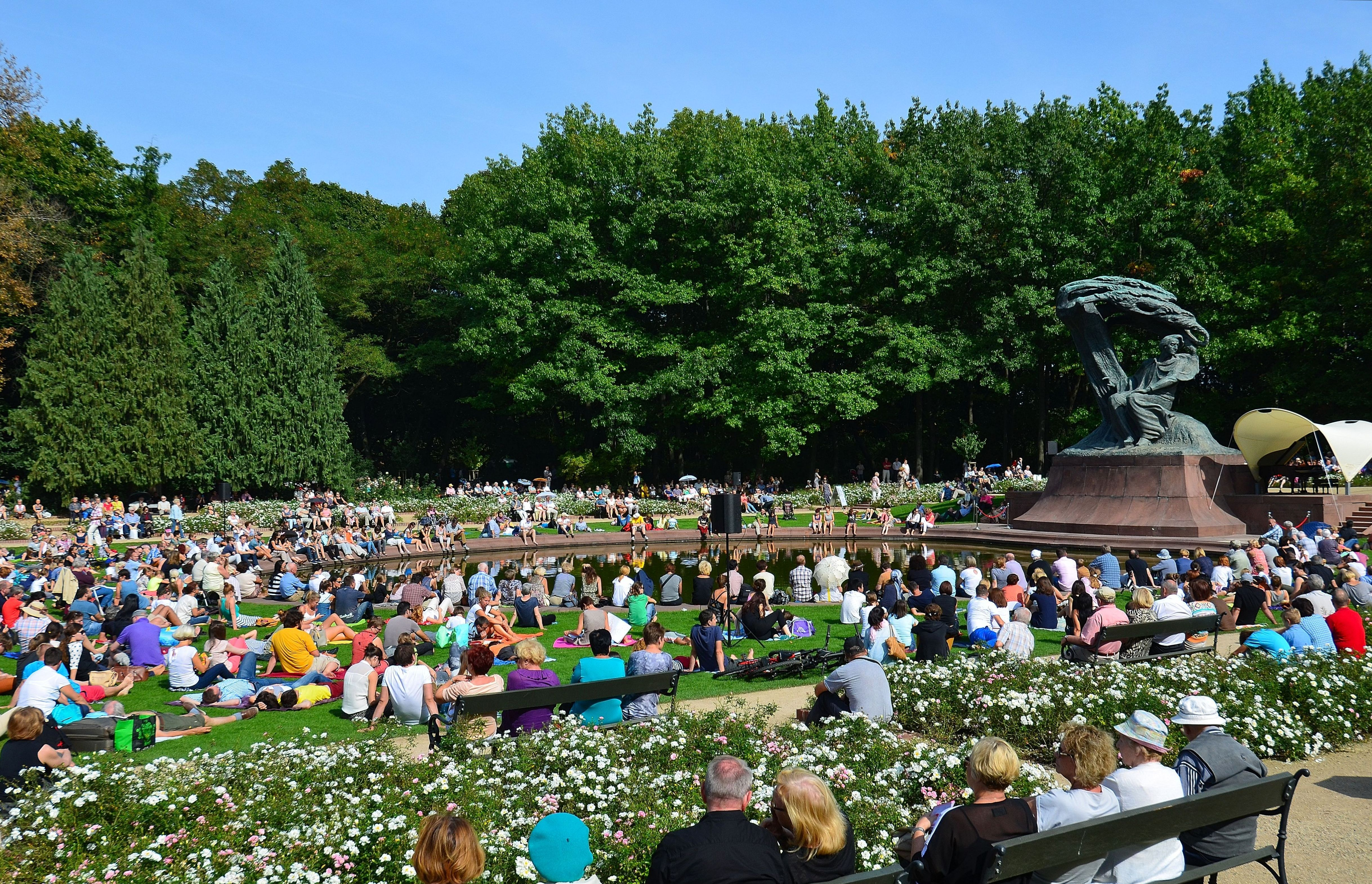
Annual Chopin summer piano concerts at the Royal Baths Park

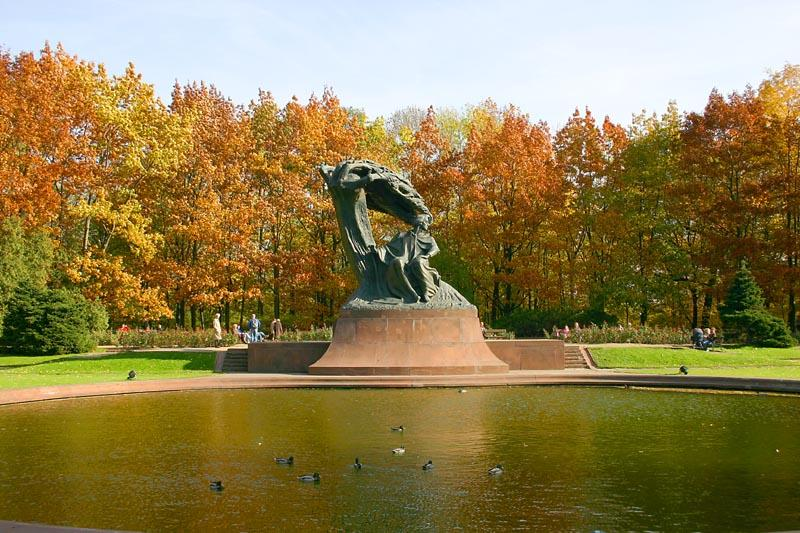
General view

== See also ==
- Adam Mickiewicz Monument in Warsaw
