= Ascher Brothers =

Former theater business in Chicago and Wisconsin

Ascher Brothers was a theater business in Chicago and Wisconsin. It was owned by brothers including Max Ascher, Nathan Ascher, and Harry Ascher who established it in 1909. The business owned more than two dozen theaters and was one of the city's largest owners of theaters along with Balaban and Katz and Lubliner and Trinz. The brothers exited the theater business in 1929.

Ascher Brothers was founded in 1909 and operated nickelodeons and acquiring, leasing, and constructing additional theaters through the 1910s. By 1919 Ascher Brothers operated at least 15 theaters including the Adelphi, Calo, Milford, Cosmopolitan, Metropolitan, and Crown. They added the Portage Park Theatre Building built in 1919. Their theaters succeeded the simple storefront operations and preceded the grand theater houses of the 1920s.

One of their theaters opened across from Marshall Field and Company on State Street.

Their theaters included organs and five-piece orchestras including at the Portage Theater. Henry L. Newhouse designed several of their theaters.

By 1923, Goldwyn Pictures owned a 60 percent stake in Ascher company stock.

== Theaters ==
- Adelphi
- Calo
- Milford
- Cosmo Theater (1913) at 7938 South Halsted
- Frolic Theater (1915) at 951 East 55th Street
- Colony
- Columbus Theater (1916) at 6236 South Ashland (63rd St. And Ashland Avenue)
- Roosevelt Theatre
- Metropolitan
- Oakland Square
- Portage Theater (1919), leased by Ascher Brothers
- Commercial Theater (1920) at 9150 South Commercial
