= R. Harold Zook =

American architect

- Born: Roscoe Harold Zook; 21 May 1889; Valparaiso, Indiana
- Died: 17 April 1949 (aged 59); Hinsdale, Illinois
- Education: Armour Institute of Technology
- Occupation: Architect
- Buildings: Pickwick Theater; St. Charles Municipal Building

Roscoe Harold Zook (21 May 1889 – 17 April 1949) was an American architect best known for his work in suburban Chicago, Illinois. He received a degree in architecture from the Armour Institute of Technology (now Illinois Institute of Technology, or IIT) in 1914. In 1916, Zook married his first wife, Mildred Barnard. They divorced in the late 1930s. They had one son, Harold Barnard Zook, who followed in his father's footsteps to become an architect in Corona del Mar, California. In the early 1940s, Zook married his second wife, Florence (Barkey) Nissen, whom he met through mutual friends (and clients). Zook died in April 1949, just short of his 60th birthday.

== Early life and career ==
Roscoe Harold Zook was born in Valparaiso, Indiana on May 21, 1889, the sixth child of Florence and Dennis Coder Zook. His father was a builder, working as a master carpenter for the Pennsylvania Railroad in Fort Wayne. Zook's uncle, Jacob Steel Zook, was also a builder, most notably designing the Brumback Library in Van Wert, Ohio, now recognized as a Historic Place.

R. Harold Zook spent most of his childhood in Fort Wayne, attending the public schools and showing an early proficiency for art. He attended college at the Armour Institute of Technology. After graduating in 1914, Zook was named to the faculty and taught for four years. He also taught interior design at the Art Institute of Chicago and apprenticed under Howard Van Doren Shaw. In the 1910s, Zook served as President of the Architects Club of Chicago, and was a member of several local architectural clubs. In 1922, Zook made an unsuccessful entry in the Chicago Tribune design competition for their new Chicago building.

Zook built a home and studio in Hinsdale in 1924. In 1925, Zook partnered with William F. McCaughey, a fellow apprentice of Shaw, to start a new architectural firm, operating out of the Auditorium Building. Later, he opened a new office on the 17th floor of the Marquette Building. He designed thirty-four homes and buildings in Hinsdale from 1922 to 1953. Twenty-eight houses in the neighborhood are still occupied. He also worked in Iowa, Wisconsin and Virginia.

He is known for the "Cotswold style cottages" he designed which use details from Tudor architecture including timber framing, exposed beams, diamond-shaped window panes, and intricate brick or stonework. He developed a roofing technique that came to be known as the "Zook roof", with wood shingles laid out in an undulating pattern across the surface to recreate the appearance of a thatched roof. The roofers used "rolled eaves" at the edges of the roof to make a curved transition into the wall below. Zook designed ornamental ironwork for several of these houses using a trademark spider web pattern.

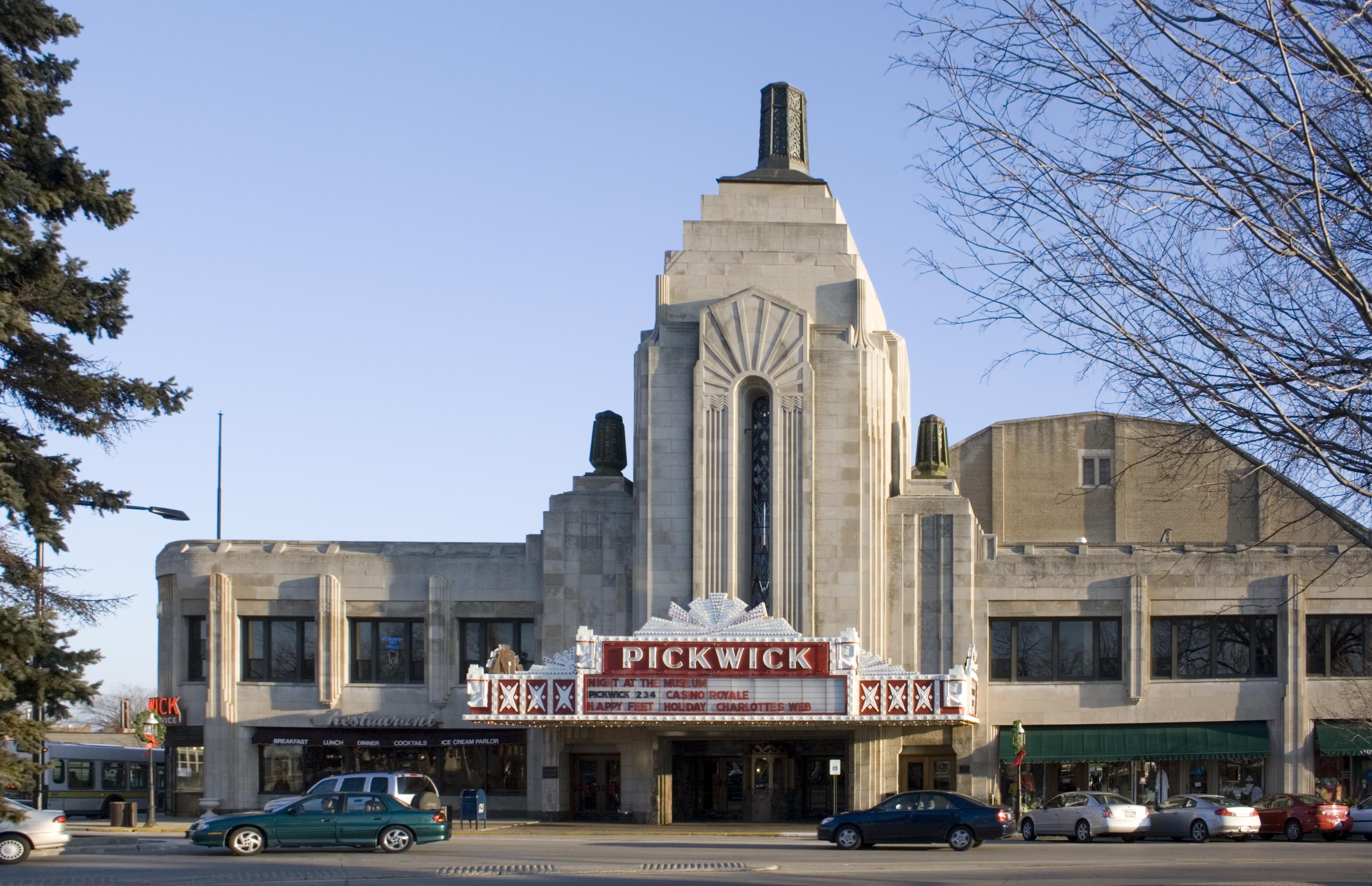
The Pickwick Theatre, in downtown Park Ridge

In partnership with architect William F. McCaughey, Zook designed the 1928 art deco style Pickwick Theatre in Park Ridge, Illinois. This was their only theater design, now listed on the National Register of Historic Places. The theater features a 100-foot-tall (30 m) tower and lantern, a unique marquee and one of the original installations of a Mighty Wurlitzer theater organ.

== Buildings ==
- 1924 - Harold Zook Home & Studio - Hinsdale, Illinois
- 1928 - Jensen House (or W. W. Thompson Home), 325 East Eighth Street, Hinsdale, Du Page County, IL
- 1928 - Pickwick Theater - Park Ridge, Illinois
- 1933 - Salerno Cookie Factory, 4500 Division St., Chicago (demolished in 2015)
- 1934 - Burns Field Shelter
- 1936 - Ralph Becker Residence, 6551 N. Waukesha, Chicago
- 1940 - St. Charles Municipal Building - St. Charles, Illinois
- 1948 - Aichinger Residence, 371 Kent Road, Riverside, Illinois
- 1927 - Private Residence Oak Street Hinsdale 2015 Luxe Magazine photo tour and article HGTV Faces of Design Dramatic Transformation winner with before and after photos
