= Pickwick Theatre =

Art deco movie palace in Illinois, USA

- Pickwick Theater Building
- U.S. National Register of Historic Places
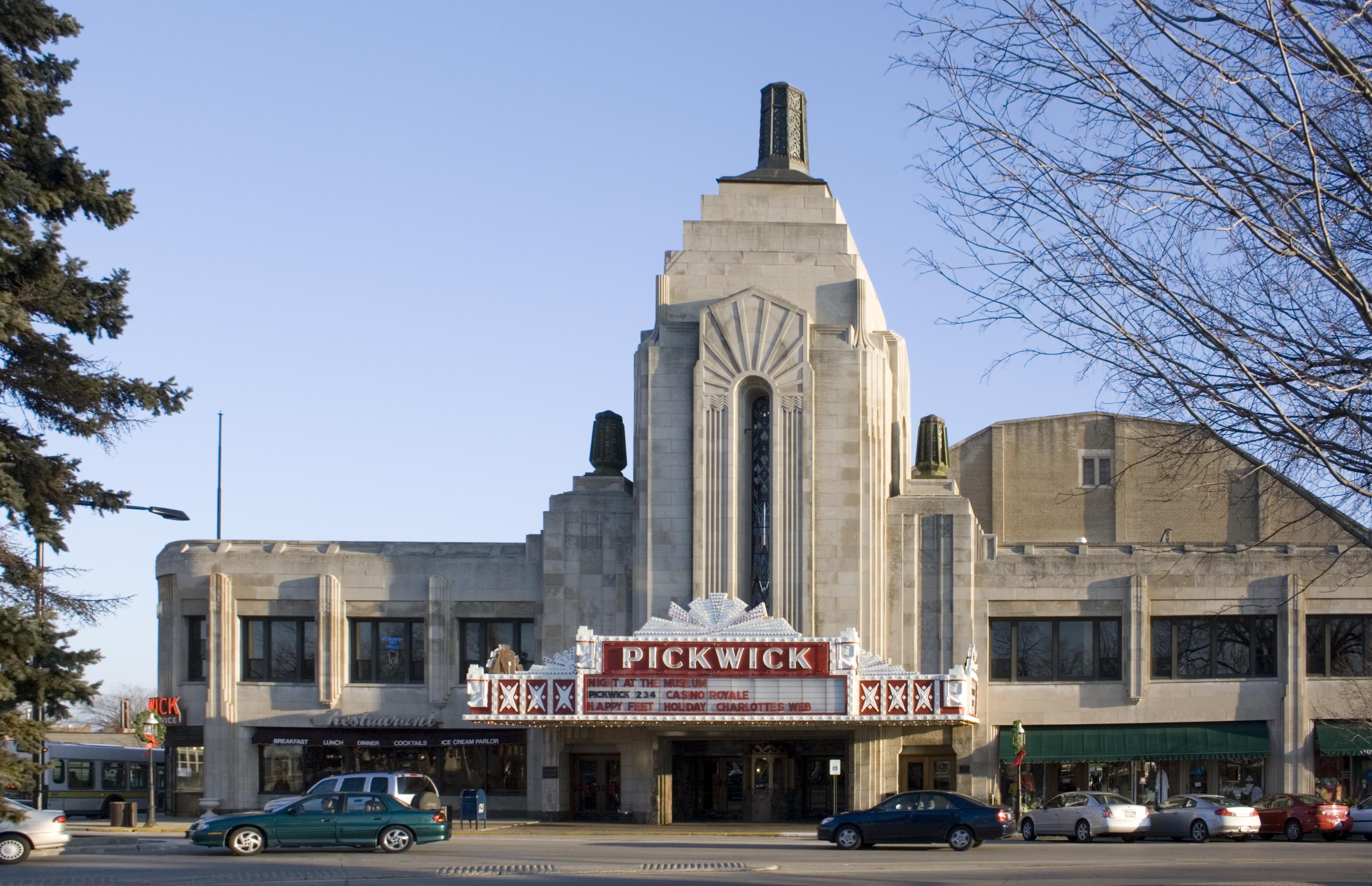
- Pickwick Theatre

- Location within Illinois Location within the United States
- Location: 5 S. Prospect Ave., Park Ridge, Illinois
- Coordinates: 42°0′38″N 87°49′45″W
- Area: 0.4 acres (0.16 ha)
- Built: 1928
- Architects: Roscoe Harold Zook, William F. McCaughey, Alfonso Iannelli
- Architectural style: Art Deco
- NRHP reference No.: 75000657
- Added to NRHP: February 24, 1975

The Pickwick Theatre is an art deco movie palace located in Park Ridge, Illinois, a suburb of Chicago.

Designed by Roscoe Harold Zook, William F. McCaughey, and Alfonso Iannelli, the Pickwick opened in 1928 as a vaudeville stage and movie theatre. It is widely recognized for its marquee and 100-foot tower, which appeared in the opening credits of At the Movies. The main auditorium, built to resemble an Aztec or Mayan temple, originally seated up to 1,400 people. Seating capacity in the main auditorium was reduced by 200 seats in 1968 and an additional 400 seats in 2012 as the result of renovations. The 2012 renovation project, valued at $1.2 million, also included a new roof, mechanical improvements and exterior renovations including those to the original marquee.

The theater was named in 1928 by the mayor of Park Ridge, William H. Malone I, for the title character Samuel Pickwick in Charles Dickens' novel The Pickwick Papers.

The building was placed on the National Register of Historic Places in 1975 and continues to host films as well as live stage shows. In 1990, theatre management expanded the Pickwick by adding three new screens behind the original auditorium. In 2017, owner Dino Vlahakis added a 39-seat theatre located on the second floor of the rear building, in place of the theatre's offices. In celebration of the 2018 Illinois Bicentennial, the Pickwick Theater was selected as one of the Illinois 200 Great Places by the American Institute of Architects Illinois component (AIA Illinois).

In 2022, the Pickwick Theatre was featured in an episode of NBC's Chicago Fire.

In 2023, the Pickwick announced that it would be operated by the Copernicus Foundation.

== See also ==
- Des Plaines Theatre
- Copernicus Center
- Portage Theater
- Patio Theater
