= Wacław Szymanowski =

Polish sculptor and painter (1859–1930)

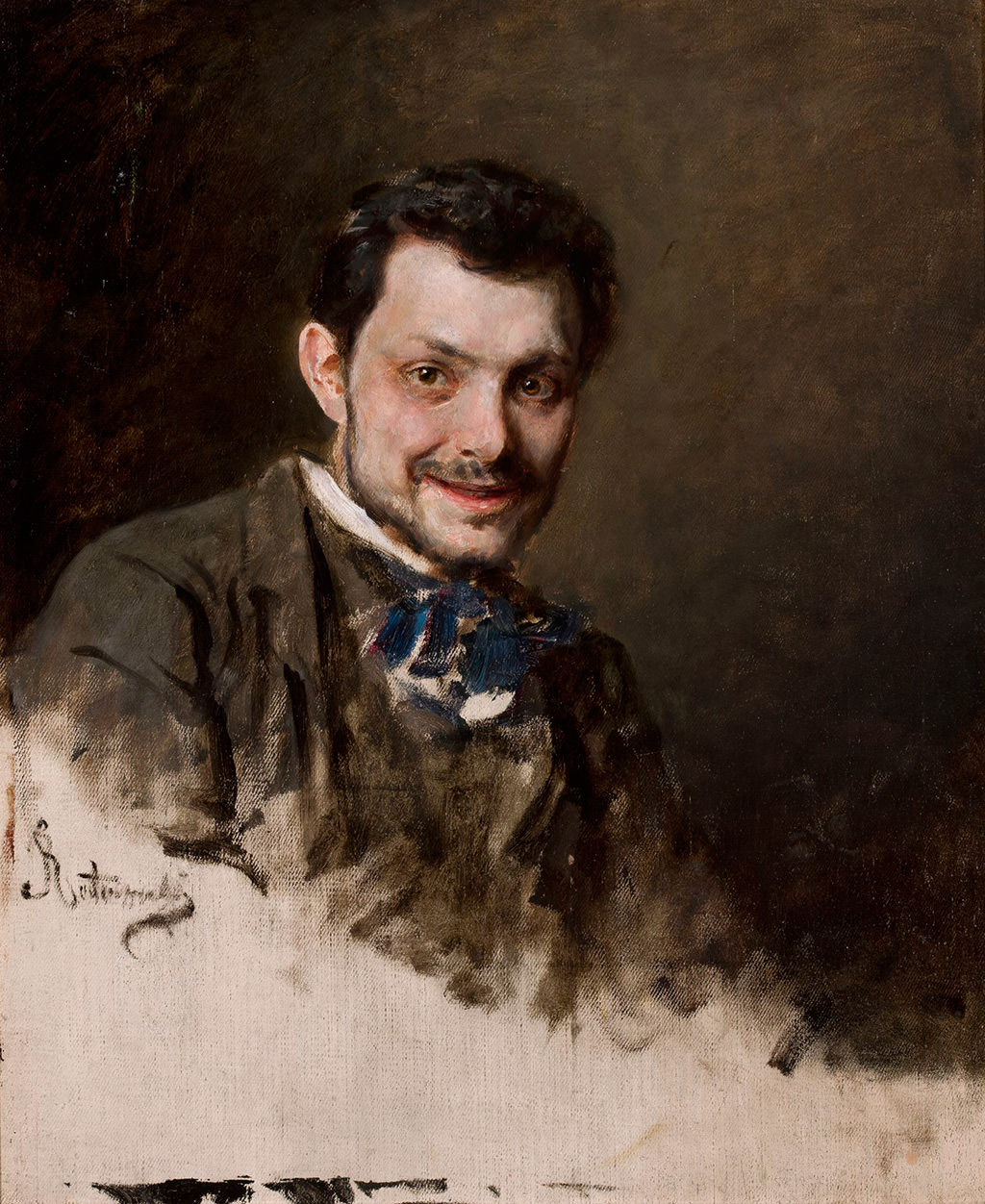
Wacław Szymanowski by Rostworowski (1888)

Wacław Szymanowski (23 August 1859 – 22 July 1930) was a Polish sculptor and painter. He is best known for his statue of composer Frédéric Chopin in Warsaw's Royal Baths Park (Łazienki Park).

== Life ==
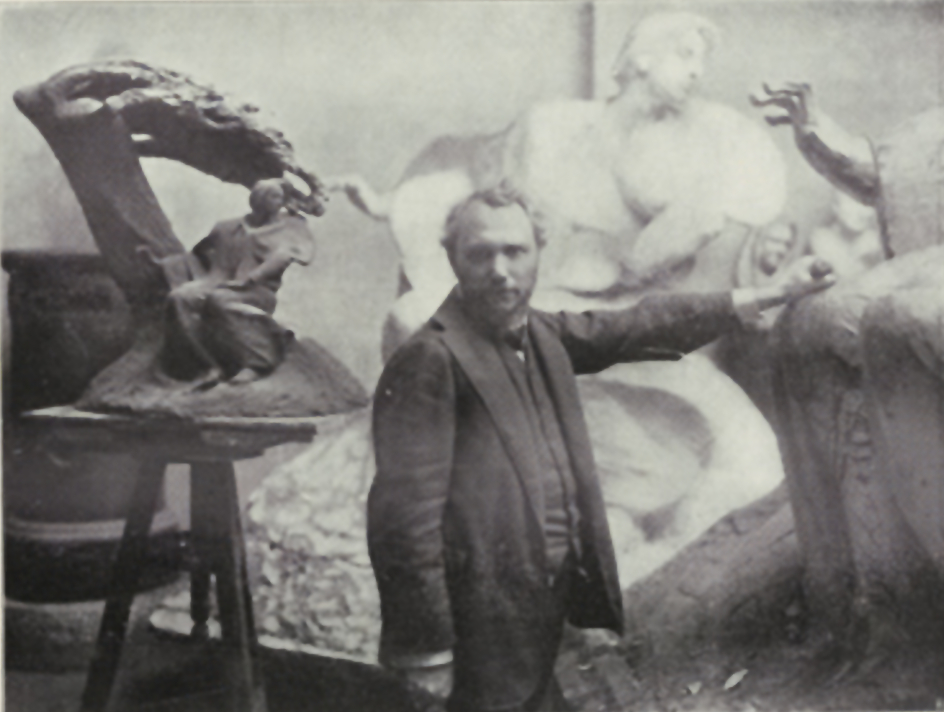
Szymanowski in studio, working on Chopin Monument

Szymanowski was born in Warsaw and was the son of Wacław Szymanowski, the journalist and writer (9 July 1821 – 21 December 1886), and the father of Wacław Szymanowski, the physicist and politician (14 April 1895 – 15 January 1965).

Until about 1895 the painter-cum-sculptor occupied himself mainly with executing genre paintings of Polish mountaineers and Hutsuls, and portraits.

He then turned to sculpture, creating compositions in Art Nouveau-Symbolist style. He designed the monuments to Artur Grottger in Kraków (1907) and to Frédéric Chopin in Warsaw; tomb monuments (including his father's at Warsaw's Powązki Cemetery); and portrait busts. He died in Warsaw at age 70.

== Chopin monument ==
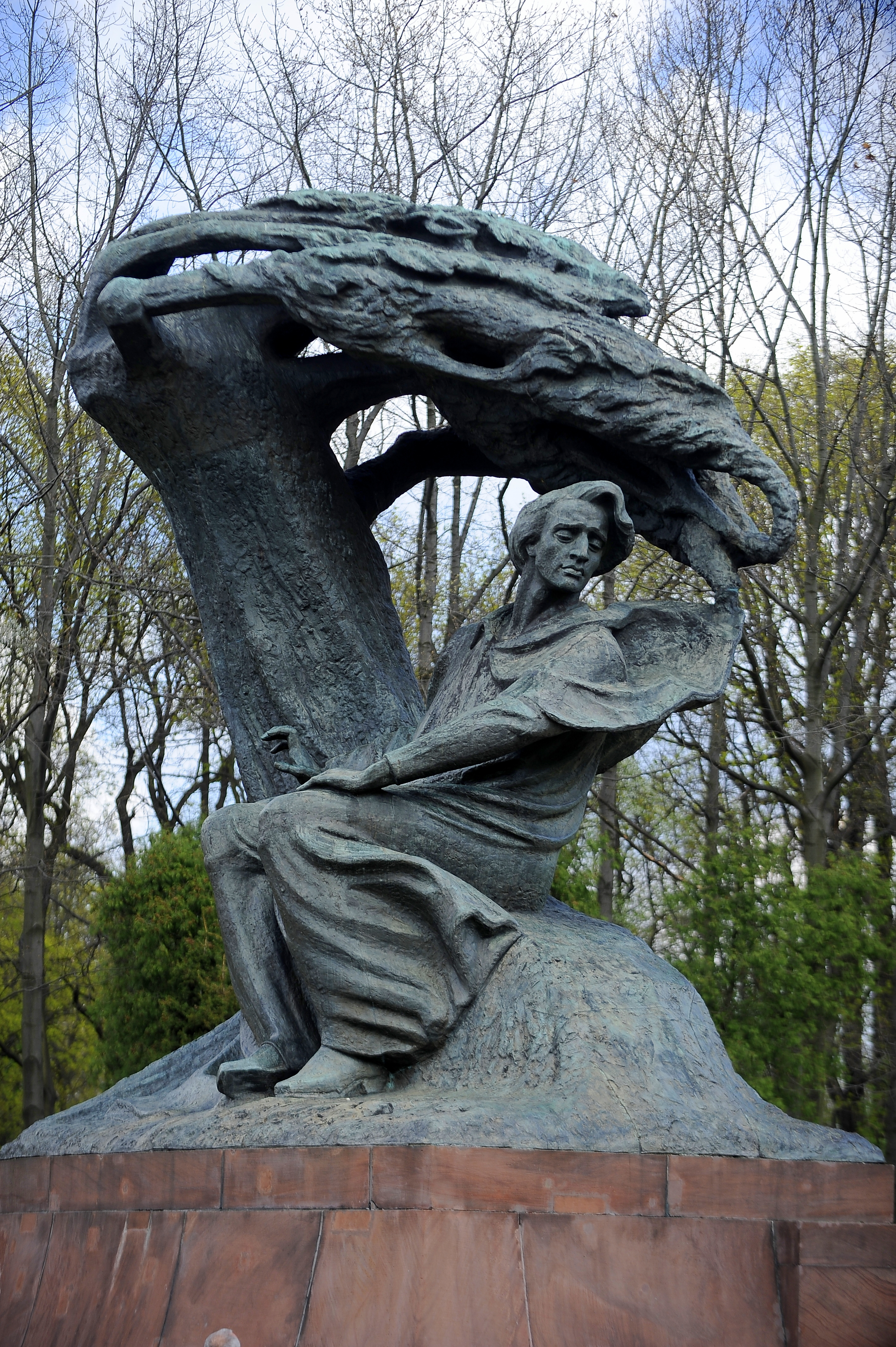
Frederic Chopin Monument in Warsaw

In 1907 Szymanowski designed the bronze statue of Frédéric Chopin that now stands in Warsaw's Łazienki Park. The statue was originally to have been erected in 1910, on the centenary of Chopin's birth, but it was delayed by controversy about the design, then by the outbreak of World War I. The statue was finally cast and erected after the war, in 1926.

== See also ==
- List of Poles—visual arts
