= Six Corners =

Shopping district in Portage Park, Chicago

Coordinates: 41°57′14″N 87°44′50″W

- Shopping District
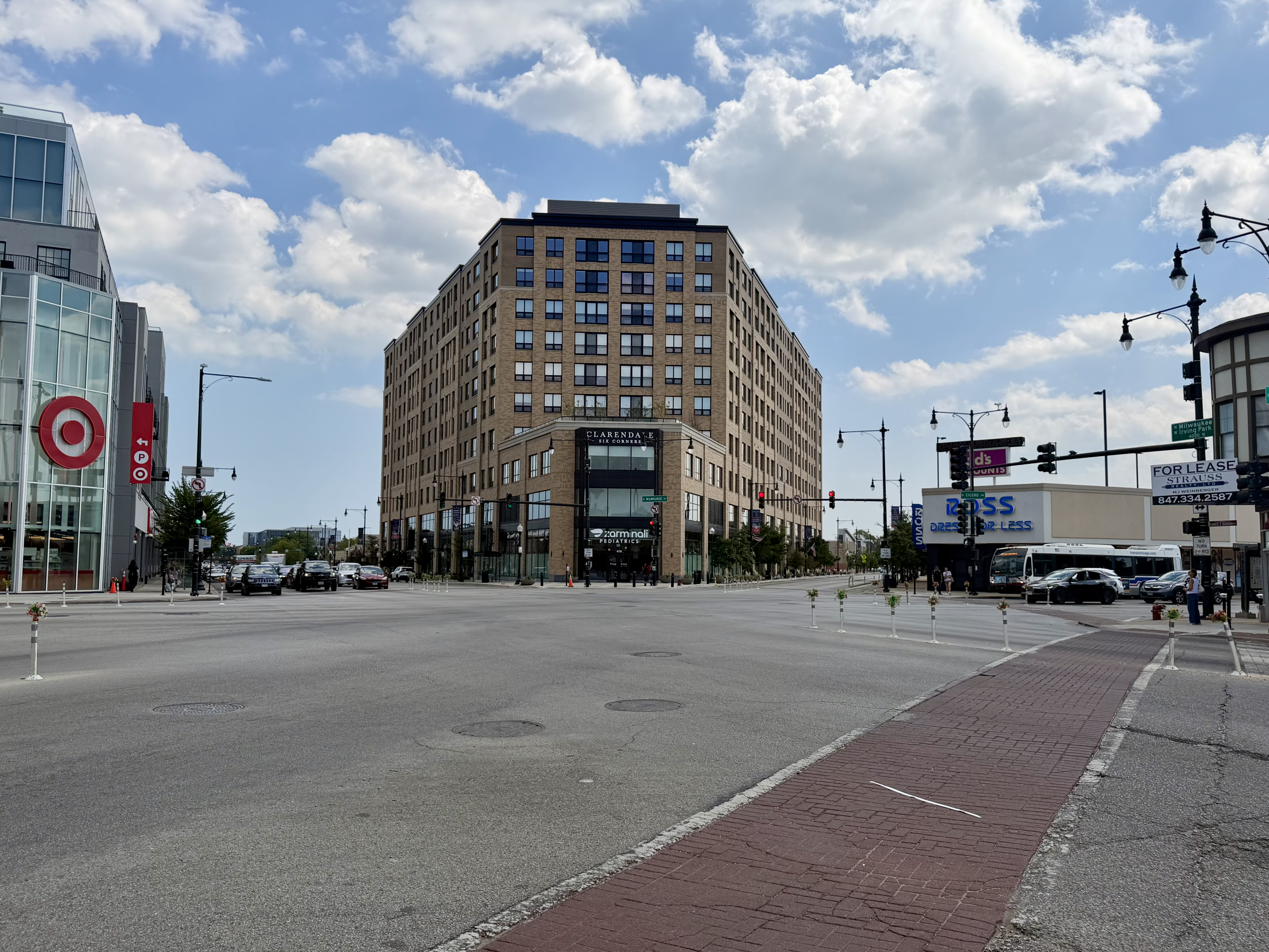
- Six Corners in 2026
- Location: Portage Park, Chicago
- Intersection: Milwaukee Avenue, Cicero Avenue, Irving Park Road
- Interactive map of Six Corners

Six Corners is a commercial area in the Portage Park neighborhood of Chicago's Northwest Side, which was the largest commercial center in Chicago outside of the Loop for most of the 20th century. The area's name comes from the fact that it is located at the intersection of three streets—Irving Park Road, Cicero Avenue and Milwaukee Avenue—thus the intersection has six streetcorners.

== Early history ==
The Dickinson Tavern was built at the present intersection of Milwaukee and Belle Plaine avenues. Jefferson Township was incorporated at the Dickinson Tavern in 1850, and the tavern served as the town hall and post office. In 1889, Jefferson Township was annexed by the City of Chicago, forming much of the city's northwest side. The Dickinson Tavern was demolished in 1929 to make way for a paint store. The area began to be called Six Corners by the 1920s.

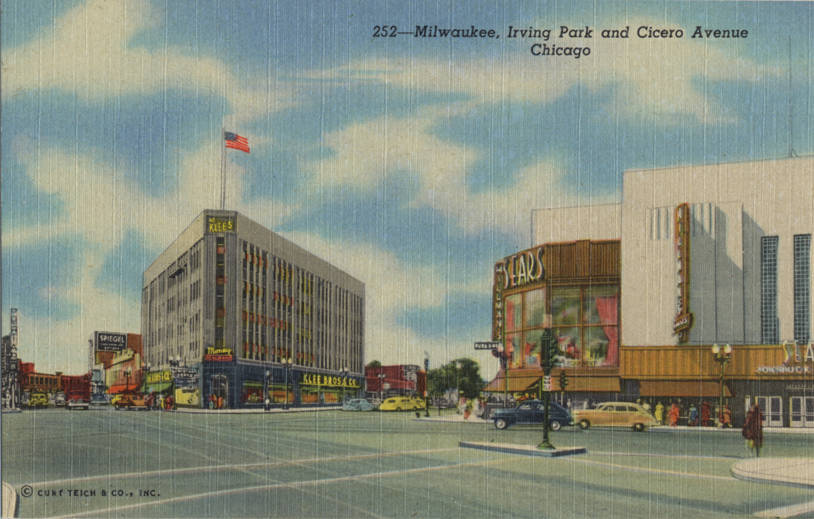
Mid-20th century postcard view.

== Notable buildings ==
=== Portage Theatre ===
The neoclassical Portage Theater at 4042-60 N. Milwaukee Ave opened on December 11, 1920, as the Portage Park Theatre, being the first theater designed for films rather than vaudeville shows in the Portage Park area. The original name is still visible on the façade of the building. The theater was designed by architect Lindsey Phelps Rowe of Fridstein & Co. and originally had a capacity of almost 2,000 seats. It was later managed by the Ascher Brothers and by 1929 was managed by Fox Chicago. The theater was managed by the G.C.S. circuit and reopened with a redesigned Art Moderne lobby on March 4, 1940. It became a second-run theater in the 1960s.

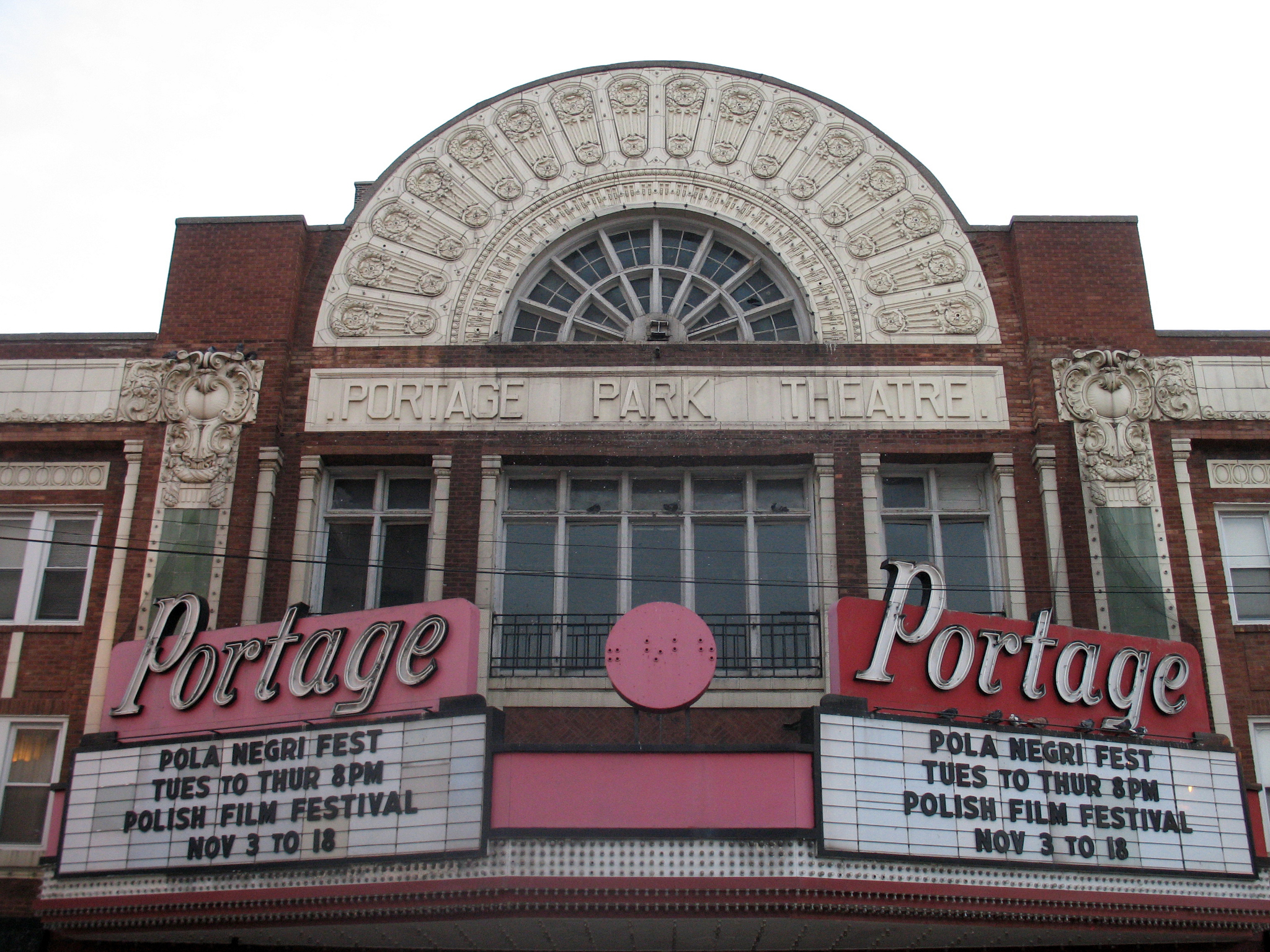
Portage Theater

In 1975, the Portage Theater was renamed the Portage Palace and briefly served as a venue for live performances by country music acts, with Conway Twitty becoming the first to play there on May 9, 1975. In the 1980s, the auditorium was divided in two. The theater closed in 2001 after years of sporadic operation. The theater was reopened after renovations in the spring of 2006 as a single-screen theater seating over 1,300. The Portage Theater closed once again on May 25, 2013, further reopening in June 2014. The theater closed once again in February 2018. The theater was taken over by the operator of the nearby Patio Theater in March 2025, with plans to reopen as a community space. Renovations began in April 2026. The Portage Theater was made a Chicago Landmark in 2013.

=== Klee Building ===
The five-story art deco Klee building at 4001-13 N. Milwaukee Ave, named for clothing retailer Klee Brothers, was built in 1931. Klee Brothers occupied the first floor, with the upper floor suites being occupied by dentists and other professionals. Klee Brothers sold the property to the clothing chain Rothschild's in the 1960s. After Rothschild's left in the 1980s, the building's first floor housed a series of bank branches, including the Capitol Federal Bank for Savings (CFBS). CFBS went bankrupt in the savings and loan crisis of the 1980s and 1990s.

CFBS president, George Demes, and chairman Alexander Sarovich had purchased the building in their own names. After both pleaded guilty to charges of financial improprieties, Sarovich was sentenced to probation and maintained sole ownership of the Klee building. By 1998, the Klee Building's first floor commercial space was vacant. The City of Chicago purchased the building from Sarovich through eminent domain for US$1.8 million. In 2005, the Chicago Tribune reported that a mixed-used redevelopment of the Klee Building and adjacent properties was scheduled to begin before the end of that year.

The Heller Building at 4015 N. Milwaukee and Woolworth Building at 4017-4021 N. Milwaukee were demolished in 2005 as part of the redevelopment of the Klee Building.

=== Sears ===
Sears opened a three-story art deco store at 4730 W. Irving Park Road on October 20, 1938, reportedly attracting a crowd of around 100,000 people. The Nimmons, Carr & Wright-designed building had a Hillman's grocery store in the basement, and was the first Sears to be air-conditioned. The Six Corners location was one of four Sears stores built after the company conducted an eight-year study of shopping habits. The building was constructed with large display windows but few other sources of natural light, as the study concluded that customers preferred merchandise lit with artificial light. During its operation, this Sears location served as the primary anchor of the Six Corners shopping district. As the company and area declined, the Six Corners location became the last remaining Sears in Chicago, eventually closing in July 2018. In 2024, the Sears building was reopened as a multi-use apartment and retail building, with a Target on the ground floor. As part of the redevelopment of the building for residential use, many exterior windows were added.

=== Peoples Gas ===
Peoples Gas operated an aboveground gas tank at 3955 N. Kilpatrick Avenue, just east of the Six Corners intersection, until 1971 when the structure was dismantled. The facility continued to operate until 2019 when Peoples Gas moved to the Forest Glen community area. As of September 2026, the land remained vacant after the facility was demolished, with plans to redevelop the property having been stalled multiple times.

The Peoples Gas Irving Park Neighborhood Store at 4839 W. Irving Park Road was built in 1926 with a design by Von Holst & Elmslie. It was designated a Chicago Landmark in 1987.

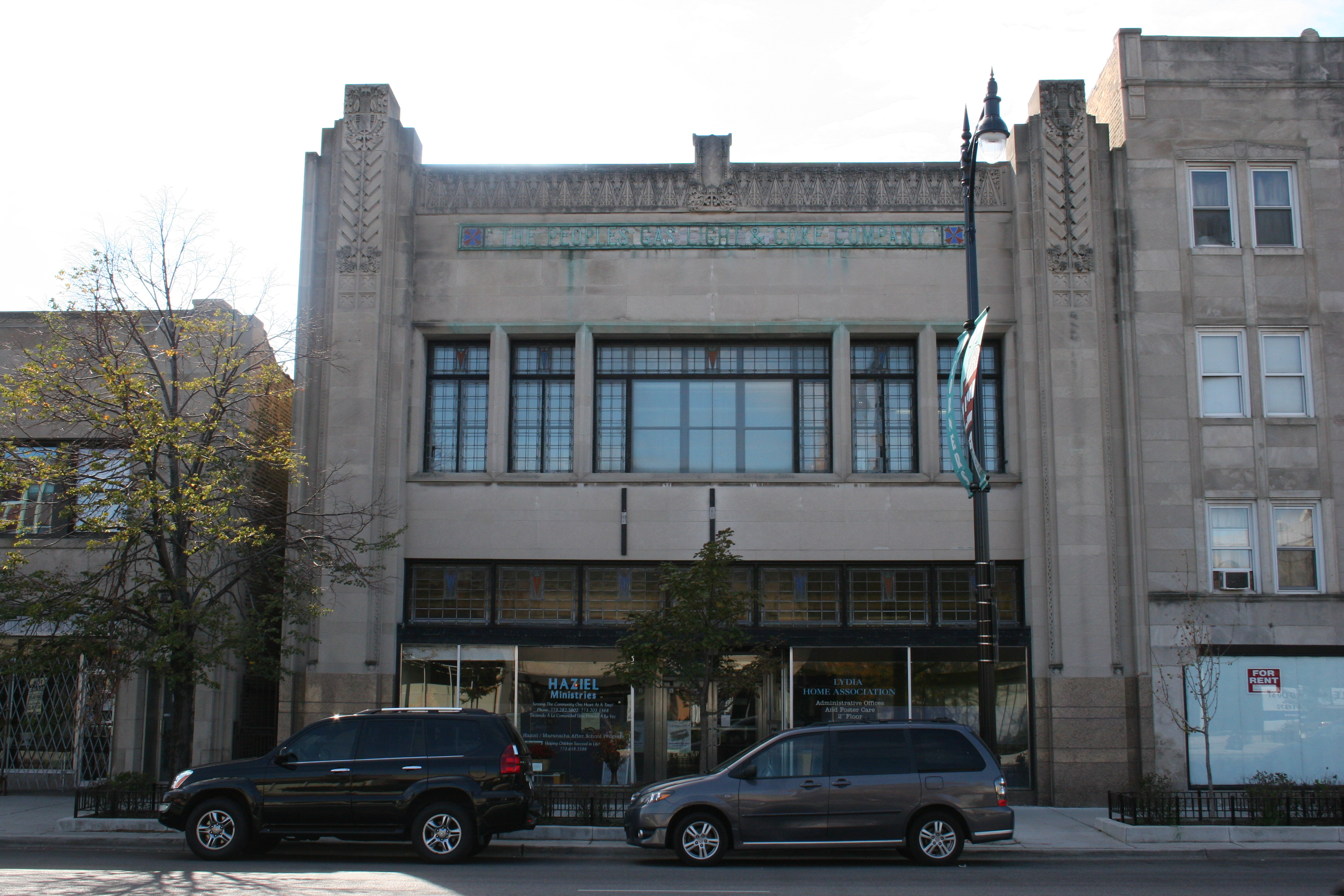
Peoples Gas Irving Park Neighborhood Store

=== Straus and Schram ===
The former Straus and Schram building is at 4901 W. Irving Park Road.The building has housed a Bank of America branch, the Northwest Chicago Film Society, and a Binny's Beverage Depot.

== Later history ==
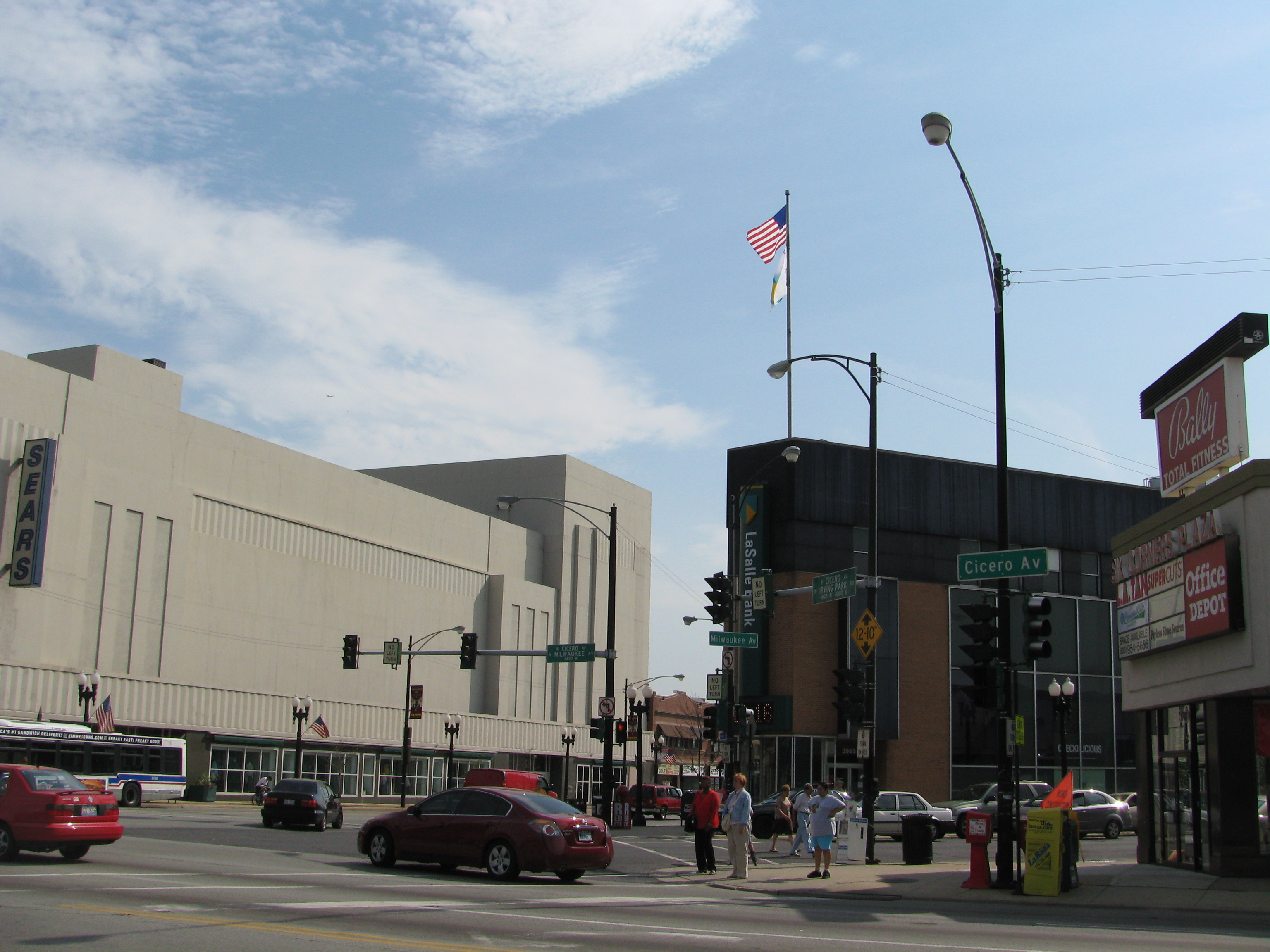
Six Corners in 2007

=== Decline ===
Six Corners experienced an economic decline between the 1980s and 2010s, starting with the long vacancy of the Klee Building. The closing of bank branches in Six Corners, as well as the construction of large indoor shopping malls in nearby suburbs, further contributed to dwindling patronage of businesses in the district. Harlem Irving Plaza in Norridge, Illinois, located 3.5 miles due west of Six Corners along Irving Park Road, greatly expanded in the late 1970s, adding two new department stores and a food court. Some residents likened Six Corners during this era to a ghost town.

=== Preservation and revitalization efforts ===
In 1997, a study by National Main Street Center, a program of the National Trust for Historic Preservation, identified conversion of the Klee Building as a first step towards revitalizing Six Corners.

In August 2013, the Planning and Development Department of the City of Chicago adopted the Six Corners Economic Development Master Plan. The plan was made in collaboration with a committee consisting of various area business and property owners, neighborhood associations, and representatives from the 45th and 38th City wards. The goals of the plan are to attract more businesses and patrons to the Six Corners area, upgrade buildings, and improve the ease of pedestrian and vehicular navigation of the district.

In 2020, local groups lobbied for the preservation of the Sears building under any new development plans, hoping to prevent it from being demolished like other historic buildings in Six Corners and around Chicago had been.

At least eight businesses were scheduled to open at Six Corners in the spring of 2014. In 2016, the Chicago Tribune reported that the former Bank of America building at 4747 W Irving Park Road would be turned into a retail building called The Point at Six Corners, with Aldi and Ross serving as the anchor tenants.

In September 2026, Alderman James Gardiner of the 45th ward announced that construction of a new shopping center was expected to begin by March 2027. The planned Shops at Six Corners will be built on a vacant lot once used by Peoples Gas.

=== Neighborhood associations ===
In the mid-1990s, the nonprofit organization Greater Northwest Development Corporation successfully urged the city to set up a tax increment financing district (TIF) for the area east of Cicero Avenue and the Klee Building to allocate property taxes towards infrastructure improvements and development. The establishment of this TIF led to the opening of a Jewel shopping center at Six Corners. A second TIF was setup for the rest of Six Corners west of Cicero sometime before 2003.

The City of Chicago maintains a number of special service areas (SSAs), managed by associations of local businesses, in which property owners pay taxes for city services like holiday decorations, trash pickup, security, and snow removal. The Six Corners was granted its own SSA, Special Service Area 28, in 2014 by request of the Six Corners Association. The Six Corners Association managed SSA 28 until 2020. The Six Corners Chamber of Commerce Managed the SSA until 2022, when it was removed from the role by a City Council committee over alleged mismanagement. After the Belmont-Central Chamber of Commerce was appointed to temporarily manage the SSA, the Portage Park Chamber of Commerce took over the role in 2023. In 2026, Six Corners Association announced that it would dissolve at the end of that year.

== In popular culture ==
In 2013, the local Filament Theatre premiered a play called Crossing Six Corners, based on interviews with residents and historians. A new version of the play premiered at the Filament in 2017 to commemorate the 75th anniversary of the Six Corners Sears.

In 2018, the play Six Corners, by playwright Keith Huff, in which several scenes take place in the eponymous shopping district, premiered at the American Blues Theatre in Chicago.

== Naming dispute ==
Other three-street intersections in Chicago are sometimes referred to as "six corners". As the economic impact of the Portage Park shopping district declined, Wicker Park replaced Portage Park as the largest commercial area in Chicago outside the Loop. Subsequently, the "six corners" description has also been applied to the intersection of Milwaukee, North, and Damen avenues in the Wicker Park, with at least two Wicker Park businesses incorporating the words "six corners" into their names. This has led to confusion among tourists, and debate among Chicagoans about which intersection is the "real Six Corners." Opponents of use of the term for the Wicker Park intersection have suggested reviving its older nickname, "The Crotch.”

== See also ==
- The Brickyard (shopping mall)
- Chicago Loop
- Golf Mill Shopping Center
- Magnificent Mile
- Milwaukee-Diversey-Kimball District
