= Portage Park, Chicago =

Community area in Chicago, Illinois

Portage Park
- Community area
- Community Area 15 – Portage Park
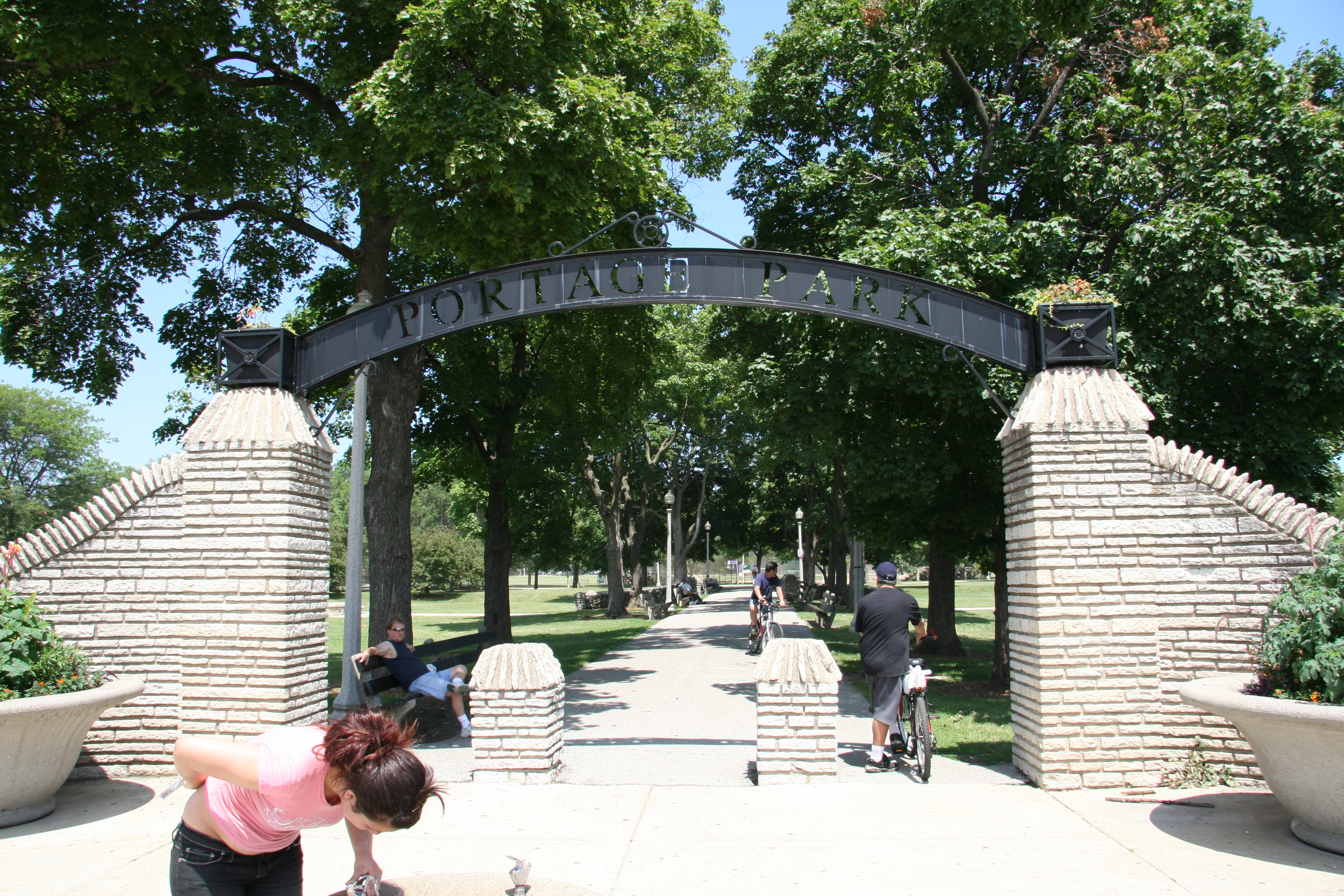
- The southwestern entrance into Portage Park at the intersection of Irving Park Road and Central Avenue

- Location within the city of Chicago
- Coordinates: 41°57′N 87°45.6′W
- Country: United States
- State: Illinois
- County: Cook
- City: Chicago
- Named for: Portage Park
- Neighborhoods: List: Portage Park; Jefferson Park; Old Portage Park; Kilbourn Park; Władysławowo; Belmont-Central

Area
  - Total: 3.98 sq mi (10.31 km^{2})

Population (2024)
  - Total: 63,031
  - Density: 15,830/sq mi (6,114/km^{2})

Demographics 2024
  - White: 46.6%
  - Black: 2.3%
  - Hispanic: 40.9%
  - Asian: 5.9%
  - Other: 4.3%
- Time zone: UTC-6 (CST)
  - Summer (DST): UTC-5 (CDT)
- ZIP Codes: parts of 60630, 60634, 60641
- Median household income 2018: $66,309
- Source: U.S. Census, Record Information Services

Portage Park is one of the 77 community areas of Chicago in Illinois, United States, located on the northwest side of Chicago. Portage Park is bordered by the community areas of Jefferson Park and Forest Glen to the north, Dunning and the suburb of Harwood Heights to the west, Irving Park to the east and Belmont-Cragin to the south.

The area is notable for its Six Corners outdoor shopping district, centered at the intersection of Irving Park Road, Cicero Avenue and the diagonal Milwaukee Avenue, the Portage Theater and for its namesake - Portage Park. The name of the park was taken from the major portage linking the Des Plaines and Chicago rivers along what is today Irving Park Road. The area was so swampy that in wet weather, Native Americans and trappers were easily able to paddle through the area in either direction without leaving their canoes. In those days, the Des Plaines was perhaps the most significant way to the Illinois, and then on to the Mississippi (and to return).

Portage Park has the largest Polish community in the Chicago Metropolitan Area according to the 2000 census. Portage Park is home to the Polish American Association, the Polish Jesuit Millennium. One of the area's parks is named Chopin Park after Frédéric Chopin, Poland's most famous composer.

== History ==
In 1850, along with construction of the Northwest Plank Road (present Milwaukee Avenue), Jefferson Township was incorporated at the Dickinson Tavern. Jefferson Township was part of a large swath of land annexed to the city in 1889 in advance of the World's Columbian Exposition. Much of the area was still largely rural in the early 20th century until the extension of streetcar lines into the area along Milwaukee, Irving, and Cicero lured in immigrants from the overcrowded tenements of the city's ethnic enclaves. Soon Scandinavian, German, Italian, Polish and Irish families from the industrial areas by the Chicago River such as Polish Downtown and Goose Island were buying lots in the vicinity to build their homes. Area developers such as Szajkowski, Schorsch as well as Koester and Zander subdivided what had been farmland into subdivisions of what became part of Chicago's famous "bungalow belt".

== Demographics ==
Historical population
Census	Pop.	Note	%±
1930	64,203		—
1940	66,357		3.4%
1950	64,736		−2.4%
1960	65,925		1.8%
1970	63,626		−3.5%
1980	57,349		−9.9%
1990	56,513		−1.5%
2000	65,335		15.6%
2010	64,124		−1.9%
2020	63,020		−1.7%
U.S. Decennial Census 2018 US Census American Community Survey

== Transportation ==
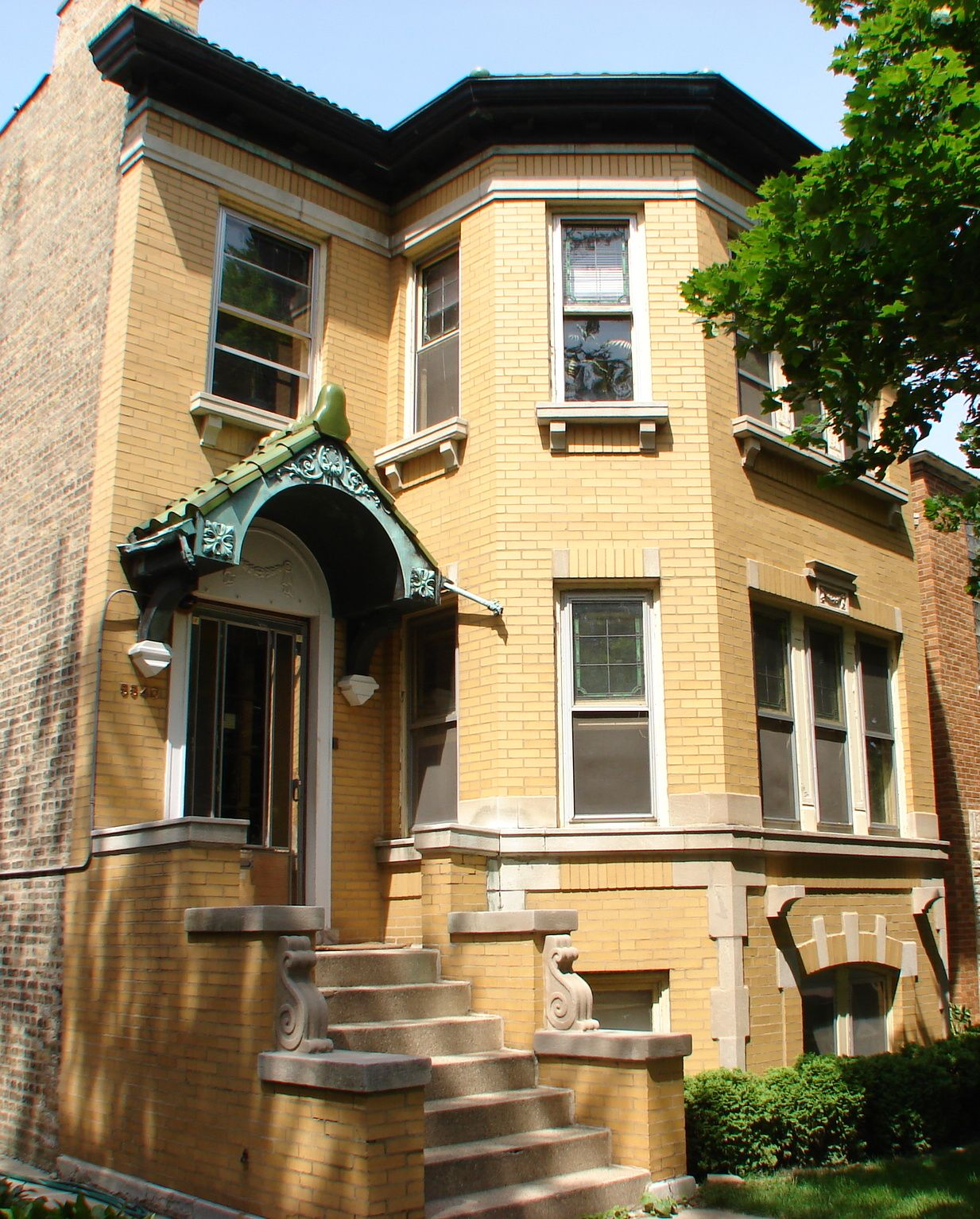
A Portage Park two-flat

The Portage Park neighborhood is accessible via mass transit through the Blue Line. Montrose station is located on Portage Park's northeastern edge in the Kennedy Expressway median. The Milwaukee District North Line has a station stop at Mayfair, just west of the Kennedy Expressway.

== Neighborhood ==
The neighborhood of Portage Park is a primarily residential area. The area's building stock is composed primarily of bungalows and two-flats. There are two large business districts in Portage Park; one, Six Corners, at the intersection of Irving, Cicero, and Milwaukee, and another at Belmont and Central extending south into Belmont-Cragin.

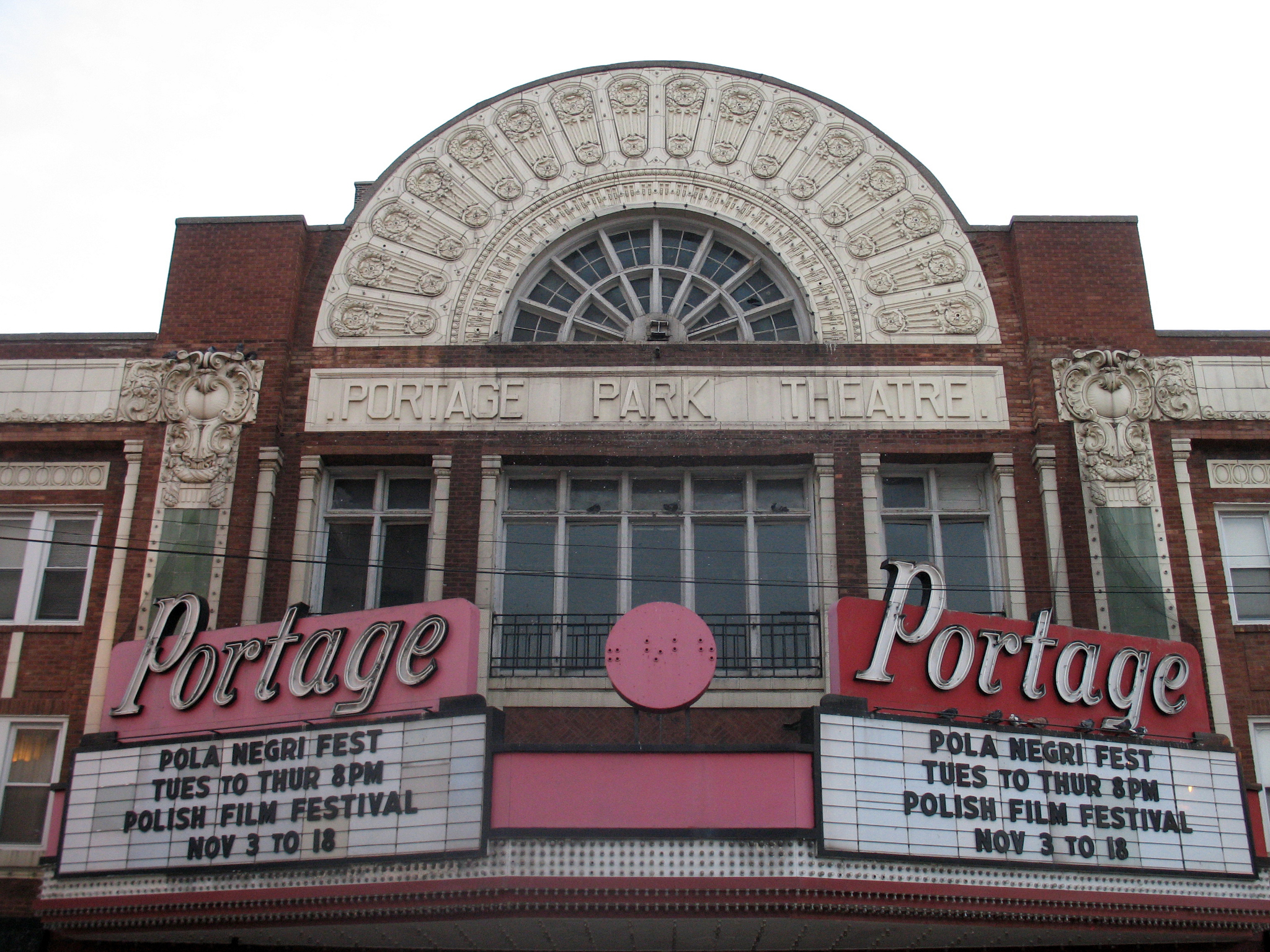
Portage Theater marquee in 2007

The area was home to a number of movie palaces, among which were the Portage, Patio, and Belpark theaters. While the Belpark is now closed, the Portage Theater has been renovated with public TIF funds and is now home to a performing arts center showing arthouse and silent films. The Patio was privately restored and now hosts musical and theater acts.

Portage Park is also home to a cluster of architecturally significant churches, and is one of the few neighborhoods on the city's North Side highlighted in Marilyn Chiat's The Spiritual Traveler: Chicago and Illinois. Examples include St. Ladislaus, St. John of Rila the Wonderworker, St. Bartholomew, St. Ferdinand, and Our Lady of Victory.

== Portage Park (Chicago Park District) ==
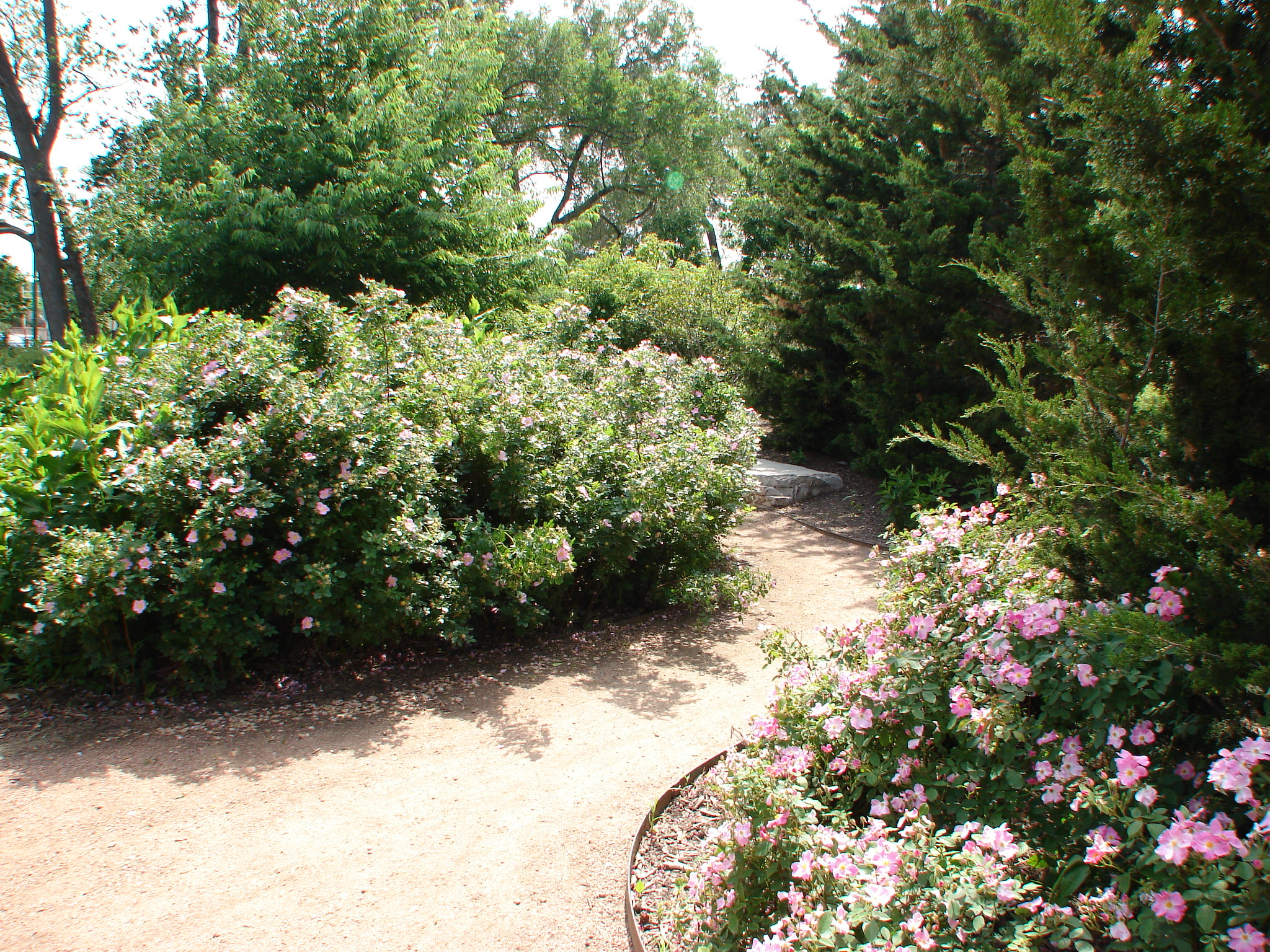
A footpath in the Chicago Park District's Portage Park

The field house at Portage Park was designed by Clarence Hatzfeld, whose firm Hatzfeld and Knox would later design many of the Prairie and Craftsman-style bungalows just east in the Villa District in Irving Park near historic St. Wenceslaus.

The park originally had a dirt bottom pond that blended into a concrete bottom pool. The hill to the east of the pool that exists now, was the dirt that was removed when the pool was first created when the park was first established. The pond portion of the pool extended to the western edge of this 'hill'. The earliest building in the park is the gymnasium, followed by the field house. The staircase to the field house was a circular affair, supported by several cement posts under the platform that was created by a large landing at the second floor.

The WPA was very involved in the creation of the long gone Rock House at the south end of the Park. This Rock House had a small pond area that had goldfish and flower basins. Until the polio epidemic, the water was kept at a substantial depth to support the fish over winter. The flower planters to the north and east of the main entrance off Central at Irving Park Road will give an idea of just what the Rock House looked like. There were seats throughout the half circle structure of flagstone. Except for the overhead wooden canopy, every where you looked there was white flagstone - walls, seats, floor, support pillars. The Chicago Park District has WPA photos of the structure. The park predates all of the buildings that surround it.

The swimming events of the Pan-American Games were held here in 1959 in the second pool constructed in the park, as were the US swimming trials for the 1972 Summer Olympics.

== Other parks ==
The neighborhood of Portage Park has a number of other greenspaces aside from the neighborhood's namesake park:

- Chopin Park
- Dickinson Park
- Dunham Park
- Grace Zwiefka-Thuis Playlot Park
- Lucy Gonzales-Parsons Playlot Park
- Wilson Park

== Education ==
Portage Park residents are served by Chicago Public Schools, which includes neighborhood and citywide options for students. There are also a number of private parochial schools run by Roman Catholic and Lutheran congregations in the area.

=== Public Elementary Schools ===
- Peter A. Reinberg Elementary
- Chicago Academy Elementary
- William P. Gray Elementary
- Portage Park Elementary School
- Prussing Elementary School
- Smyser Elementary School

=== Public High Schools ===
- Edwin G. Foreman High School
- Carl Schurz High School
- Rickover Naval Academy School
- Vaughn Occupational High School

=== Private Elementary Schools ===
- St. John's Lutheran School
- Midwestern Christian Academy
- Our Lady of Victory School (Closed 2016)
- Pope Francis Global Academy
- St. Bartholomew School (Closed 2023)
- St. Ladislaus (Closed 2015)
- St. Robert Bellarmine

=== Private High Schools ===
- St. Patrick High School
- Luther North College Prep (Closed after the 2016–17 school year)

== Politics ==
Portage Park has supported the Democratic Party in the past two presidential elections by large margins. In the 2016 presidential election, Portage Park cast 15,884 votes for Hillary Clinton and cast 5,344 votes for Donald Trump (71.11% to 23.93%). In the 2012 presidential election, Portage Park cast 14,028 votes for Barack Obama and cast 4,989 votes for Mitt Romney (72.34% to 25.73%).
