= Copernicus Center =

Movie theatre and music venue in Jefferson Park, Chicago

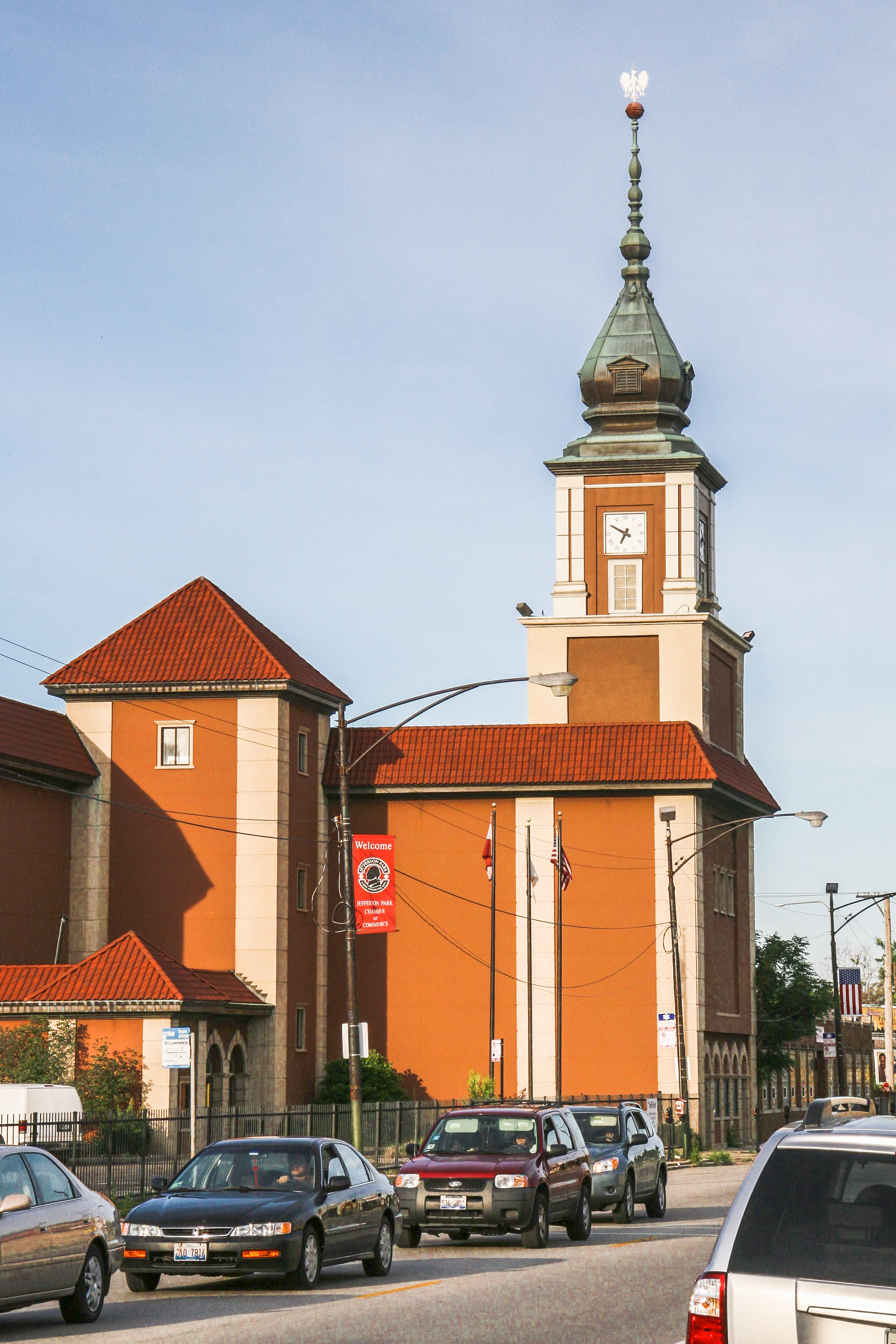
- Interactive map of Copernicus Center
- Address: 5216 W Lawrence Ave; Chicago, Illinois; United States
- Location: Jefferson Park, Chicago
- Coordinates: 41°58′05″N 87°45′31″W
- Owner: Copernicus Foundation

Construction
- Opened: June 27, 1930
- Architect: Rapp and Rapp

Website
- copernicuscenter.org

The Copernicus Center (formerly Gateway Theater) is a 1,852-seat former movie palace in the Jefferson Park community area of Chicago in Cook County, Illinois, United States. The Copernicus Center is located at 5216 W. Lawrence Avenue.

== Gateway Theater ==
The former Gateway Theater was designed by architect Mason Rapp of the firm Rapp and Rapp, known for their design of deluxe theaters not only in Chicago (Chicago, Oriental, and Palace Theatres) but throughout the United States. It is the architect's only surviving atmospheric theatre in Chicago. The Gateway Theater opened on June 27, 1930. The Gateway was one of the first theaters designed with acoustics in mind, featuring sound-absorbent plaster. The theater's name comes from Jefferson Park's nickname, "the Gateway to Chicago".

The original Grand Hall and Grand Foyer ceilings and walls were designed and hand painted with scenes from Greek and Roman mythology and custom patterns by noted Chicago artist Louis Grell (1887–1960).

The Gateway was the flagship theater for the Balaban and Katz movie theater chain and opened on June 27, 1930.

== Copernicus Foundation ==
The Copernicus Foundation (Polish: Fundacja Kopernikowska) is a 501(c)(3) not for profit organization. It was founded by Poles in Chicago in 1971 in order to raise funds towards raising a monument for the famous astronomer Nicolaus Copernicus to be set in front of the Adler Planetarium. After the Nicolaus Copernicus Monument's dedication at the 500th anniversary of Copernicus in 1973, the foundation decided to use leftover funds towards the purchase of a cultural and civic center for Chicago's Polish community. In 1979, the foundation purchased the Gateway Theater and began remodeling it into the Copernicus Center.

In 2023, the Pickwick Theatre in Park Ridge, Illinois announced that it would be operated by the Copernicus Foundation.

== Copernicus Center ==
In 1979, groundbreaking ceremonies took place at the Gateway Theater. Because of the Gateway Theater's historical importance as the first theater built for "talkies", the Copernicus Foundation decided to preserve the theater itself while remodeling around it, dividing the original 40-foot entry lobby and constructing three floors of office, meeting room and classroom space for the cultural center. This first stage was completed in 1981.

In 1985, the "Solidarity Tower", with its matching façade, was erected atop the building. The exterior of the building was modified to resemble the historic Royal Castle in Warsaw, Poland. That year the Copernicus Foundation took over the administration of the Gateway Theatre.

In November 2014, then-president Barack Obama spoke about immigration reform and the Ferguson unrest at the Copernicus Center.

In December 2015, Liberating a Continent: John Paul II and the Fall of Communism, narrated by Jim Caviezel and produced by the Knights of Columbus, premiered at the Copernicus Center.

The Copernicus Center hosts ESL classes and meetings of the Jefferson Park Chamber of Commerce.

== Taste of Polonia ==
The Taste of Polonia is a Chicago festival held at the Copernicus Center every Labor Day weekend since 1980. It is the Copernicus Foundation's major fundraiser and a four-day celebration of Polish cultural heritage, traditions, and customs. The Taste of Polonia features Polish cuisine, entertainment on three stages, as well as numerous Polish handcrafters and artisans. Taste of Polonia is the largest ethnic festival in Chicago, drawing crowds between 40,000 and 60,000 each year over the span of four days.

Numerous local and national politicians have made appearances at Taste of Polonia. In 1992, the Taste of Polonia was hosted by President George H. W. Bush. In 2000, the fest was visited by future Vice President Dick Cheney, Tipper Gore, and Hadassah Lieberman. Former House Speaker Newt Gingrich and his wife Callista came to the festival on September 4, 2011, ahead of the 2012 Republican Party presidential primaries to screen the documentary 9 Days That Changed the World, which the couple coproduced.

The Taste of Polonia was not held in 2020 and 2021 due to the COVID-19 pandemic.

== See also ==
- Balaban and Katz
- Theatre in Chicago
- History of Chicago
- Culture of Chicago
- Poles in Chicago
- Polonia
- Polish-Americans
