= Patio Theater =

Music venue and movie theater located in Chicago, Illinois

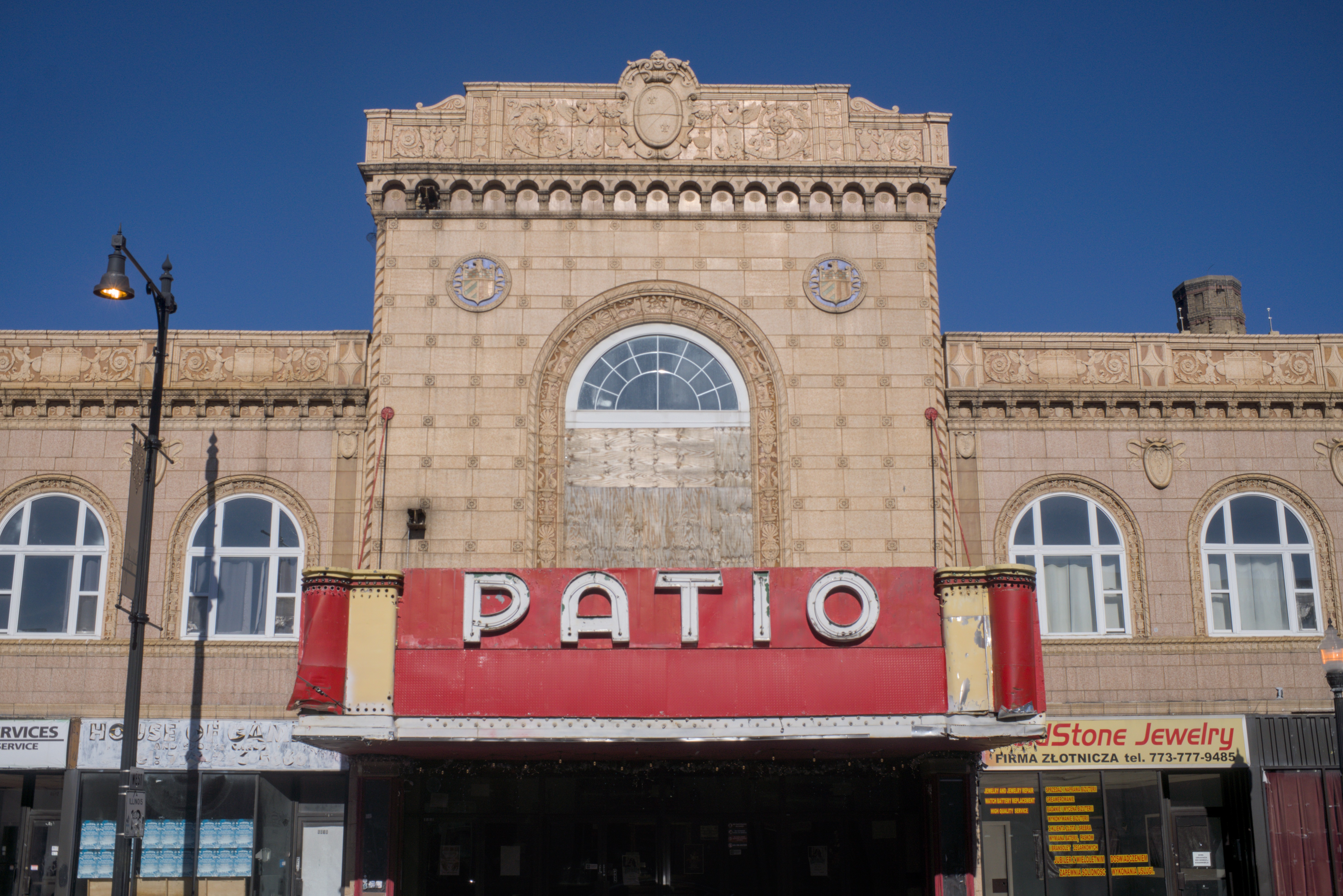
- The Patio Theater in 2025.
- Interactive map of Patio Theater
- Address: 6008 West Irving Park Road; Chicago, Illinois 60634; United States
- Coordinates: 41.953201°N 87.777127°W
- Owner: Privately Owned
- Capacity: 1500
- Type: Music Venue & Cinema

Construction
- Opened: January 29, 1927
- Closed: 2001, April 2014
- Reopened: Fall 2021
- Architect: R.G. Wolff

Website
- https://thepatiotheater.com/

The Patio Theater is a music venue and movie theater located at 6008 W. Irving Park Road on the northwest side of Chicago, Illinois in the Portage Park neighborhood. The building was built in 1927 as a movie theater. Chris Bauman took over the operations of Patio Theater in 2018 and became owner by the end of 2019.

The 1,500-seat theater hosts concerts and comedy events. Notable performers include Juice Wrld, Puddle of Mudd, Coolio, The Wailin' Jennys, Raheem DeVaughn, and Bone Thugs-n-Harmony.

In 2020, the Patio Theater launched a Premiere Membership program that provides members with access to member-only events, such as celebrity meet and greets, movie premieres, member-only concerts, access to pre-sale tickets, skip-the-line venue access at all events, and monthly insider information.

The Patio Theater temporarily closed in the wake of the COVID-19 pandemic, and reopened with scheduled shows as of January 2022.

== Original style and restoration in 1960s ==
The theater originally opened in 1927 with a capacity of 1,500 people. Its atmospheric auditorium was designed in the Neo-Pompeiien fashion, with various Spanish and Italian architectural influences present as well. One of the theater's most prominent design features is the auditorium ceiling. The ceiling replicates a night sky by use of dark blue paint, blinking lights, and clouds that are displayed on the ceiling via projector. The original horizontal theater marquee is still in place. The vertical section was removed in the 1970s.

Still in place within the auditorium is the theater's original Barton pipe organ. Once used to accompany silent films, the organ fell into disrepair and was restored in the 1960s by volunteers from the Chicago Area Theater Organ Enthusiasts (CATOE). After its restoration, it provided music for various shows and sing-alongs.

== History ==
The theater was shuttered in 2001 due to failure of its air conditioning chillers and issues regarding a then new license instated by the City of Chicago. Renovations began on the theater in 2010, and were finished in 2011. The theater officially reopened on June 3, 2011. The first film to play at the theater in over 10 years was Thor.

The theater installed a 2k digital cinema projector in late 2012 after a Kickstarter campaign. It retains dual 35mm film projectors.

After a period of showing "intermediate run" new releases, the theater transitioned to a rental-based business model in June 2013. The nonprofit Chicago Film Society was in residence there until the theater closed again in April 2014, as owner Demetri Kouvalis reported problems with heating and cooling equipment.

The theater re-opened again on December 4, 2014. There was another period of closure, and the theater re-opened May 7, 2016 under new owners with a screening of Jaws. The Kouvanis family sold the theater to Eddie Caranza, who owns the Congress Theater as well. Chris Bauman, the president of Zenith Music Group and operator of the Avondale Music Hall in Chicago, purchased the building in 2019, and lead renovation efforts; the theater reopened in autumn 2021.
