= Susan Sadlowski Garza =

American politician

Susie Sadlowski Garza

Member of the Chicago City Council from the 10th ward
- In office May 18, 2015 – May 15, 2023
- Preceded by: John Pope
- Succeeded by: Peter Chico

Personal details
- Born: Susan Sadlowski; December 16, 1959 (age 66) Chicago, Illinois, U.S.
- Party: Democratic
- Spouse(s): Dave Martino (1979–1981); Raul Garza (1996–present)
- Children: 4
- Relatives: Edward Sadlowski (father)
- Education: Governors State University (BA); Concordia University Chicago (MC)

Susan Sadlowski Garza is a former member of the Chicago City Council serving as the alderman for the 10th ward. The 10th ward is located on Chicago's southeast side and includes East Side, Hegewisch, Jeffrey Manor, South Chicago and South Deering. She initially assumed office after defeating Rahm Emanuel ally John Pope in the 2015 election. During the 2019–23 term, she was selected to be the chair of the Chicago City Council Progressive Reform Caucus.

== Early life, education and personal life ==
The daughter of union activist Edward Sadlowski, Sadlowski Garza was born in 1959 at University of Chicago Medical Center in Hyde Park and raised on the southeast side of Chicago. She attended Jane Addams Elementary School and George Washington High School. She then went on to attend Western Illinois University for one year before dropping out. At age 19, she married David Martino with whom she had one son. They divorced two years later.

In 1996, she married Raul Garza. She graduated from Governors State University with a bachelor's degree and later from Concordia University with a master of counselling. She became a school counselor at Jane Addams Elementary School and joined the Chicago Teachers Union where she eventually became an area Vice President.

== Political career ==
With the encouragement of Karen Lewis, Sadlowski Garza chose to run against four term incumbent John Pope, a staunch Rahm Emanuel ally on the council, to serve as alderman for the tenth ward. Sadlowski Garza ran on a platform of an elected Chicago School Board, cracking down on petroleum coke processing plants, participatory budgeting and diversifying the ward's economy.

In the February top-two primary, Pope received 44% of the vote with Sadlowski Garza in second place with 24%. As no candidate won an absolute majority, the two competed in a run off election scheduled for April. On election night, Sadlowski Garza led Pope by seven votes.

=== Alderman ===
Sadlowski Garza was eventually declared to have a twenty-vote victory, winning with 5,825 to Pope's 5,805. She joined the Progressive Reform Caucus. Despite being Irish and Polish, she joined the council's Latino Caucus. She is assigned to the following committees; Committee on Committees, Rules and Ethics; Committee on Education and Child Development; Committee on Housing and Real Estate; Committee on Human Relations; Committee on Special Events, Cultural Affairs and Recreation; Committee on Transportation and Public Way.

In November 2015, she joined a protest of KCBX Terminals, a petcoke processing facility owned by the Koch brothers. in her ward. That year, she voted no on a proposed budget for the city.

Sadlowski Garza is a member of the Council's Progressive Reform Caucus.

Sadłowski Garza was, at one point, a close ally on the City Council of Mayor Lori Lightfoot. However, by 2023, she expressed frustration with Lightfoot, remarking that before Lightfoot, she had, "never met anybody who has managed to piss off every single person they come in contact with — police, fire, teachers, aldermen, business, manufacturing."

Sadłowski Garza is not seeking reelection in 2023.

=== Democratic Committeewoman ===
In 2016, Sadlowski Garza defeated Pope-proxy Fred Carrizales in the race to serve as the Democratic committeeman for her ward. In that same election, she was a delegate for the presidential campaign of Vermont Senator Bernie Sanders from Illinois' 2nd congressional district.
