= Wolf Lake (disambiguation) =

Wolf Lake is an American horror television series.

Wolf Lake may also refer to:

== Places ==
=== Lakes ===
- Wolf Lake (Alberta), Alberta
- Wolf Lake (Yukon), northwestern Canada
- Wolf Lake (Indiana–Illinois), Hammond, Indiana and Chicago, Illinois
- Wolf Lake (Union), Union County, Illinois
- Wolf Lake (Indiana), Noble County, Indiana
- Wolf Lake (Michigan), Watersmeet Township, Michigan
- Wolf Lake (Becker County, Minnesota)
- Wolf Lake (Cottonwood County, Minnesota)
- Wolf Lake (New York), Sullivan County, New York
- Wolf Lake (Adams), Adams County, Wisconsin
- Wolf Lake (Woodboro), Woodboro, Wisconsin
- Wolf Lake (Ontario), Sudbury, Ontario
- Wolfe Lake (Ontario), Westport, Ontario

=== Municipalities ===
- Wolf Lake, Illinois, an unincorporated community in Union County
- Wolf Lake, Indiana, an unincorporated community in Noble County
- Wolf Lake, Michigan, a census-designated place
- Wolf Lake, Minnesota, a village

== Other uses ==
- Wolf Lake (film), a 1978 film
- Wolf Lake Speedway, a racing venue in Hammond, Indiana
