= William W. Powers =

American politician

William W. Powers (November 3, 1876 – July 14, 1938) was an American politician who served as a member of the Illinois House of Representatives. Powers was born on November 3, 1876, and educated in the parochial and public schools. He worked in the steel and insurance industries respectively. He served for a time as the Chief Clerk of the County Court of Cook County. In 1965, the Illinois General Assembly renamed the state park around Wolf Lake as the William W. Powers State Recreation Area.
