= Senator Dawson =

Senator Dawson may refer to:

- Dan Dawson (politician) (born 1978), Iowa State Senator
- Glenn Dawson (born 1944), Illinois State Senator
- M. Mandy Dawson (born 1956), Florida State Senate
- William A. Dawson (1903–1981), Utah State Senate
- William Crosby Dawson (1798–1856), Georgia State Senate
