= Southeast Chicago Observer =

Newspaper

- Type: Semi-monthly newspaper, community journalism
- Format: Broadsheet
- Owner: Southeast Chicago Development Commission
- Publisher: Doug Knuth
- Editor: Tia Carol Jones
- Founded: 1998
- Ceased publication: October 2012
- Headquarters: 2938 E. 91st Street, Suite 298, Chicago, IL
- Circulation: 10,000
- Website: https://web.archive.org/web/20130217052233/http://www.southeastchicago.org:80/observer.html

Southeast Chicago Observer was a semi-monthly newspaper published on Wednesdays by the Southeast Chicago Development Commission (SEDCOM), a community development organization operating in the Southeast Side of Chicago. The newspaper covered the Bush, South Chicago, East Side and Hegewisch neighborhoods. SEDCOM established the newspaper to advertise area businesses, alert residents about local services and provide local perspective on area events.

With the demise of its parent organization, Southeast Chicago Observer ceased publication in October 2012, leaving Our Neighborhood Times as the Calumet region's sole newspaper.

== Regular features ==
An average issue of the Observer features community news, announcements, regular columns (see below) and occasional editorials and feature stories. The Southeast HD, SEDCOM's community health initiative, puts together the Southeast HD Lifestyle section that includes health-related articles and a community calendar. For the most part, the Observer is written in English, but Lifestyle articles are usually written in both English and Spanish.

== Columns ==
As of the January 28, 2012 issue, the Observer features the following regular columns:

- Dining Detective - features reviews of area restaurants by the pseudonymous M. Garza.
- Mad Money - a financial advice column by Carla Madison of Mad Money Financial.
- Urban Housecall - a medical advice column by Dr Karla Robinson of Urban Housecall magazine.

=== Past columns ===
Joe Mulac, a former president of the Southeast Chicago Historical Society, wrote a regular column called “A Look Back..." from August 8, 2001, until a few weeks before his death in June 2005. The column discussed various facets of the area history.

== Circulation ==
Southeast Chicago Observer is delivered throughout the Bush, South Chicago, East Side and Hegewisch, with most copies distributed on the East Side. Out of 13,000 copies distributed each week, approximately 3,460 copies are delivered to apartment buildings and other residences – the rest are delivered to local businesses, libraries and other high-traffic locations.
