= Monica Faith Stewart =

American politician (born 1952)

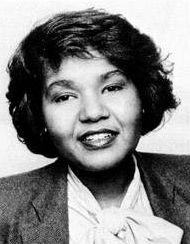

Member of the Illinois House of Representatives from the 29th district
- In office January 14, 1981 – January 12, 1983
- Preceded by: Clarence B. Williamson
- Succeeded by: District abolished

Personal details
- Born: September 3, 1952 Chicago
- Party: Democratic
- Education: Vassar College; John F. Kennedy School of Government

Monica Faith Stewart (born September 3, 1952) is an American politician who served as a Democratic member of the Illinois House of Representatives. She represented the 29th district for one term, from 1981 until 1983.

== Early life and education ==
Stewart was born in Chicago on September 3, 1952, and attended Chicago Public Schools, graduating from Englewood High School in 1970. In 1974 won a fellowship to study in East Africa and spent some weeks with the Frelimo liberation movement in Mozambique. She graduated from Vassar College in Poughkeepsie, New York in 1975 with a bachelor's degree in History. She later earned a master's degree from the John F. Kennedy School of Government.

== Career ==
Stewart launched her first bid for political office in 1977, when she ran unsuccessfully for alderman of Chicago's 18th ward. She won 23 out of 28 majority-Black precincts in the 66-precinct ward.

She was elected to the Illinois House of Representatives in the 1980 election, as one of three representatives from the 29th district on Chicago's South Side. Stewart ran as an independent Democrat, and in the primary election she bested the other candidates by a wide margin. She also received the most votes of any candidate in the five-way general election race, which the Chicago Defender described as "hotly contested". She received the greatest number of votes of any candidate, 76,600 as against 64,700 for regular Democrat Raymond Ewell. She was, at the time, the youngest African American woman who had ever served in the Illinois state legislature.

In the 82nd General Assembly, where Democrats were in the minority, she served on the Executive Committee and the Public Utilities Committee. She also served on the Rape Study Commission and cosponsored legislation to increase the penalties for gang rape. The General Assembly faced a difficult task of redistricting, as the voters of Illinois had passed the Cutback Amendment in the same election that brought Stewart to the House. This amendment required the elimination of multi-member districts and a 1/3 reduction in the total number of representatives. Stewart broke from the Democratic Party to support the Republican redistricting map because it would maintain seven majority-Black State Senate districts and fourteen majority-Black State House districts. She urged that "it is important that black people use the two party system and not be used by one party".

In 1982, Stewart challenged Democratic incumbent Gus Savage in Illinois's 2nd congressional district. She came in third of four candidates in the primary, finishing behind incumbent Savage and CTA Chair Eugene Barnes. After her primary loss, Stewart chose to run for reelection in 1982 as an independent against fellow incumbent Democrat Howard B. Brookins Sr. Due to the redistricting following the Cutback Amendment, her district was now the 36th. She lost the general election.

Stewart remained involved in politics, serving as a field coordinator for Harold Washington's successful 1983 mayoral campaign. In a 1986 special election for the Chicago City Council, Stewart ran against Robert Kellam, the same white incumbent she had faced in 1977, in an eight-candidate race in Chicago's 18th ward. She was endorsed by the Chicago Tribune and by Mayor Harold Washington. Stewart, viewed as the most viable African-American opponent to Kellam, ultimately lost the election receiving 4,720 (24%) to Kellum's 12,666 votes (64%). In the 1990 Democratic primary, she challenged incumbent Mary Flowers for the 31st House District seat, losing in a four-way race.

She served as an observer with the United Nations for the 1994 South African general election. After the election, she decided to move to South Africa and opened a restaurant in Johannesburg. In 2000, Governor George Ryan appointed Stewart the managing director at Illinois Africa Trade and Investment Office in South Africa, one of the few U.S. state trade offices in Africa at the time. She served in that capacity until 2009.

She was involved in Democrats Abroad as a delegate for the 2008 presidential campaign of Barack Obama.
