= Glenn Dawson =

American politician (1944–2021)

Member of the Illinois Senate from the 14th district 30th district (1978–1981)
- In office December 3, 1978 – January 14, 1987
- Preceded by: Samuel C. Maragos
- Succeeded by: Howard B. Brookins Sr.

Personal details
- Born: January 31, 1944 (age 82) Chicago, Illinois
- Died: March 23, 2021 Michigan City, Indiana
- Party: Democratic
- Children: Three
- Education: Saint Joseph's College

Glenn V. Dawson is an American politician who served as a Democratic member of the Illinois House of Representatives from 1979 to 1980 and the Illinois Senate from 1980 to 1987.

== Early life ==
Dawson was born January 31, 1944, in Chicago. He attended Annunciata grade school and George Washington High School. He attended college at Calumet College of St. Joseph. He also attended the Chicago Marine Navigation School. He became a licensed Master and First Class Marine Pilot by the United States Coast Guard.

== Business career ==
Dawson's business career has centered around maritime industries. In the 1980s, he owned Chicago Fleeting and Marine Repair Service, a firm which was later accused of inappropriately using public resources. Dawson owns Chicago Cruises Company, which operates the MV Chicago. In 2000, it was revealed that one of his companies was misrepresented as a female owned business, costing its contracts with the City of Chicago. As of 2013, he owns Dawson Marine Services.

== Political career ==
Dawson was first elected to the Illinois House of Representatives in the 1976 general election and sworn into office November 14, 1976. After Dawson was elected to the Illinois Senate, Maragos resigned which allowed Dawson to take office a month early. After the decennial reapportionment, Dawson was slated into a majority-black district, but was able to be re-slated by the district's committeemen.

During his time in the legislature, he opposed additional landfills in Hegewisch, where he resided. Dawson opted to run for the Democratic nomination for Illinois's 2nd congressional district in the 1984 United States House of Representatives election against incumbent Gus Savage. Savage won renomination with 55,137 votes (45.05%) to Dawson's 26,868 votes (21.95%). Dawson placed second of the five candidates finishing ahead of Leon Davis, Robert Shaw, and James C. Taylor.

He lost the 1986 Democratic primary to Howard Brookins, a State Representative from Washington Heights. Dawson, who had once been considered heir apparent to Ed Vrdolyak's city council seat, chose to back Clem Balanoff in the 1987 aldermanic election after Ed's brother Victor Vrdolyak was appointed instead. Dawson had previously run against Balanoff for Democratic Committeeman as an Ed Vrdolyak ally after the latter switched to the Republican Party.
