= Bill Haarlow =

American basketball player

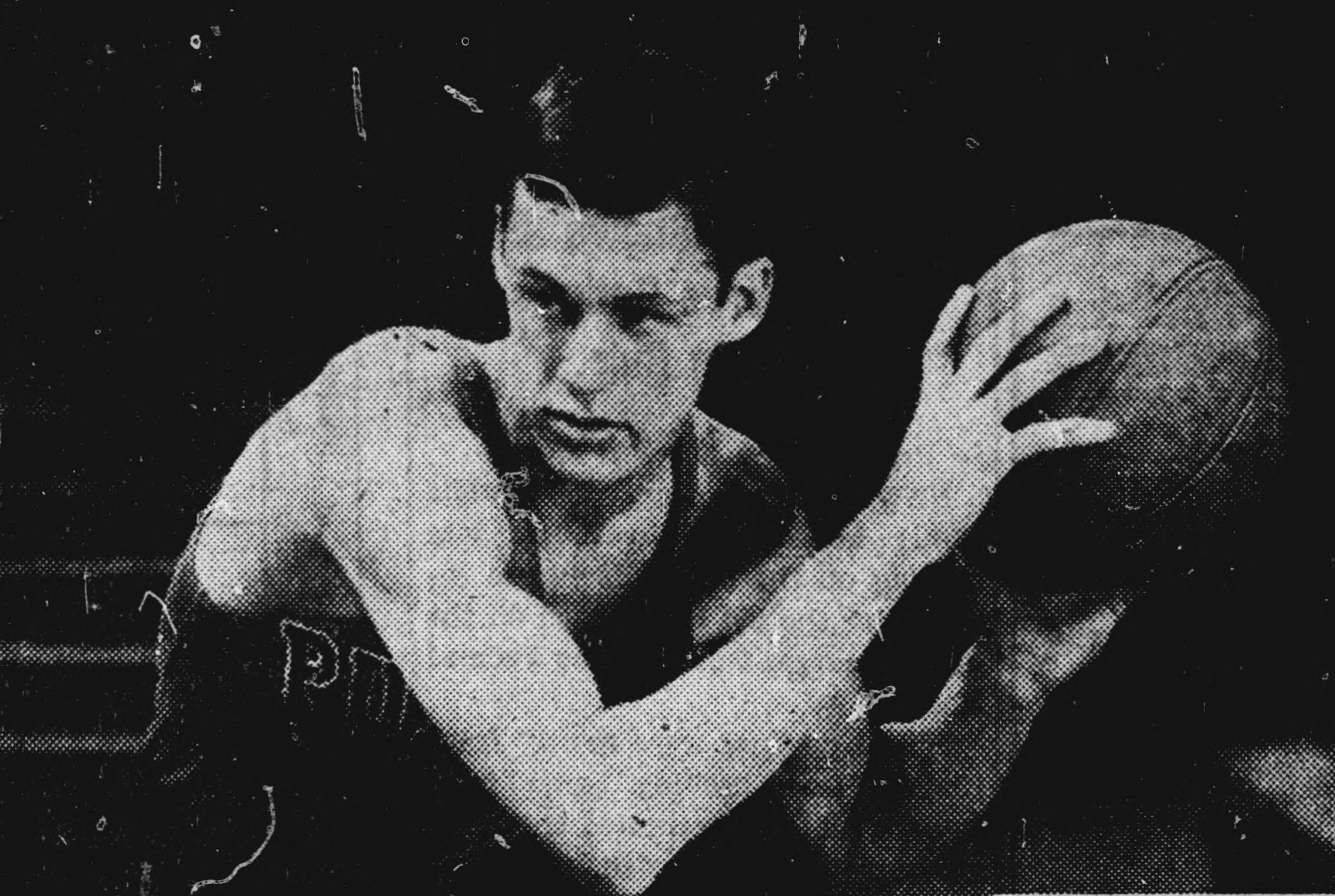
- Haarlow, circa 1936

Personal information
- Born: May 5, 1913 Chicago, Illinois, U.S.
- Died: November 21, 2003 (aged 90) Hinsdale, Illinois, U.S.
- Listed height: 6 ft 1 in (1.85 m)

Career information
- High school: Bowen (Chicago, Illinois)
- College: Chicago (1933–1936)
- Position: Forward

Career history
- 1937–1938: Whiting Ciesar All-Americans

Career highlights
- 2× Second-team All-American – Converse (1935, 1936); Second-team All-American – College Humor (1936)

Arnold William Haarlow Jr. (May 5, 1913 – November 21, 2003) was an American basketball player who played in the American National Basketball League.

Haarlow was a star player in high school, playing for Bowen High in Chicago. He then attended the University of Chicago from 1933 to 1936 at a time when the school was a member of what is now the Big Ten Conference. Haarlow was one of the top scorers in the conference throughout his college career, leading the league in scoring as a junior.

Following his college career, Haarlow played for the Whiting Ciesar All-Americans in the National Basketball League (a precursor to the National Basketball Association). Haarlow averaged 6.6 points per game for the 1937–1938 season.

After his playing days, Haarlow became a basketball referee for the Big Ten Conference, eventually serving as director of conference officials for 17 years. He died on November 21, 2003.

== Career statistics ==
Legend
| GP | Games played | FGM | Field goals made |
| FTM | Free throws made | FTA | Free throws attempted |
| FT% | Free throw percentage | PTS | Total points |
| PPG | Points per game | **Bold** | Career high |

=== NBL ===
==== Regular season ====
| Year | Team | GP | FGM | FTM | PTS | PPG |
|---|---|---|---|---|---|---|
| 1937–38 | Whiting | 10 | 26 | 14 | 66 | 6.6 |

==== Playoffs ====
| Year | Team | GP | FGM | FTM | PTS | PPG |
|---|---|---|---|---|---|---|
| 1938 | Whiting | 1 | 2 | 3 | 7 | 7.0 |
