= Mary E. Flowers =

American politician (born 1951)

Mary Flowers
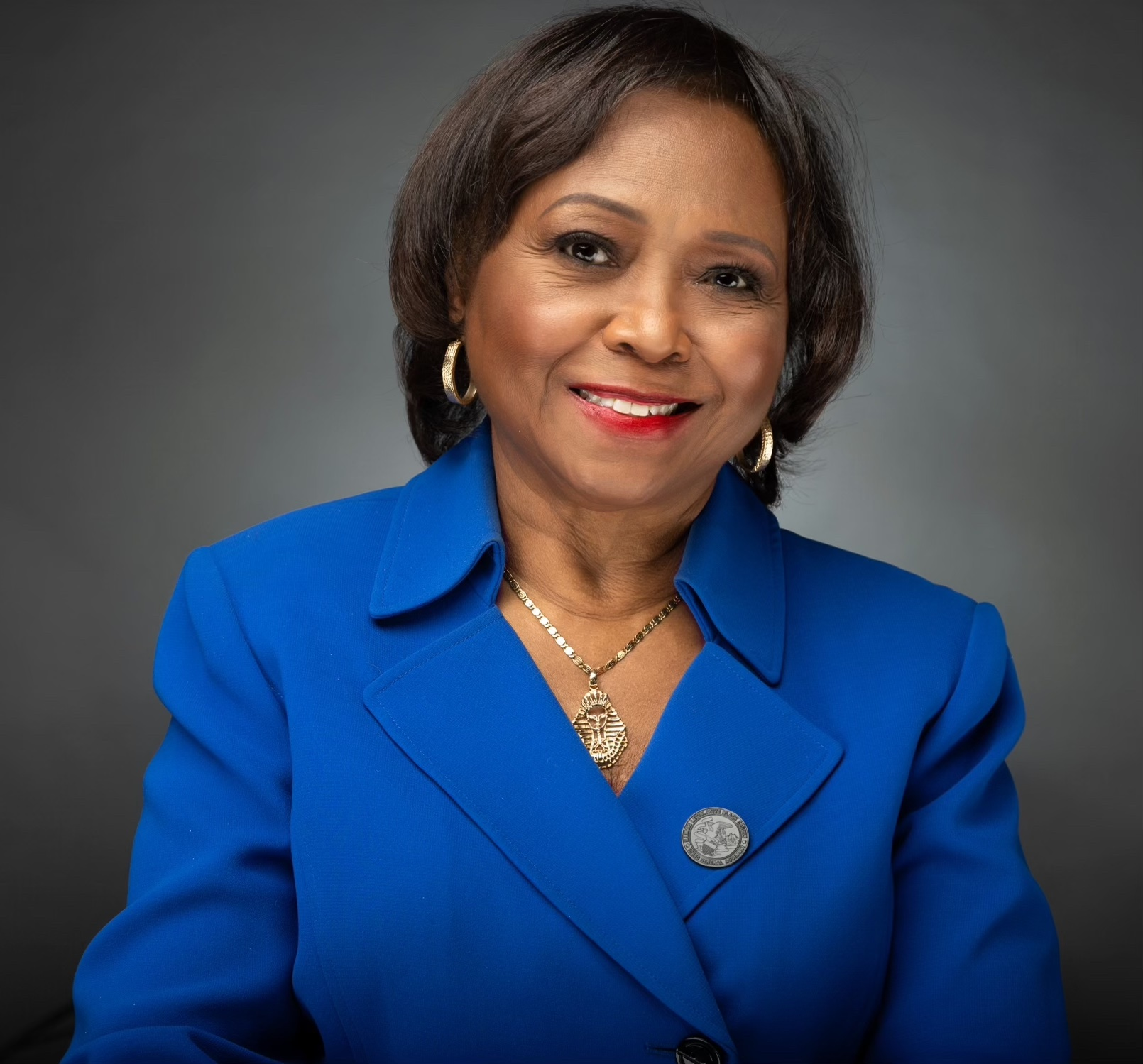

Member of the Illinois House of Representatives
- In office January 9, 1985 – January 8, 2025
- Preceded by: James C. Taylor
- Succeeded by: Michael Crawford
- Constituency: 31st district (1985–1993, 2003–2025); 21st district (1993–2003)

Personal details
- Born: July 31, 1951 (age 74) Inverness, Mississippi, U.S.
- Party: Democratic
- Spouse: Daniel Coutee (m. 1991; died 2019)
- Education: Kennedy-King College; University of Illinois, Chicago

Mary E. Flowers (born July 31, 1951) is a former Democratic member of the Illinois House of Representatives. Representative Flowers was the longest serving African-American legislator in Illinois history. She represented the 31st district from January 9, 1985 to January 13, 1993, represented the 21st district from January 13, 1993 to January 8, 2003, and represented the 31st district again from January 8, 2003 to January 8, 2025.

== Early life and education ==
Flowers was born on July 31, 1951, in Inverness, Mississippi. Her family moved to Chicago when she was a child. She attended local schools in Chicago, Kennedy King Community College and the University of Illinois at Chicago.

== Political career ==
Mary Flowers was first elected to the 84th General Assembly as a Democrat from the 31st district in 1985. She served 20 terms as a member of the Illinois House of Representatives and served as a House Deputy Majority Leader for the 103rd General Assembly.

In May 2023, Flowers was removed from her leadership position in the General Assembly by Illinois House Speaker Chris Welch, allegedly for using a slur and saying that a House staffer resembled Adolf Hitler. Flowers replied that the Speaker had taken her remarks out of context. In 2024, Welch directed more than $1.6 million in campaign contributions to Flowers' challenger in the 2024 Democratic primary. Crawford ultimately defeated Flowers in the primary.

At the conclusion of the legislative session in January 2025, Flowers had served forty years in the Illinois House of Representatives—the longest tenure of any woman in the history of the Illinois General Assembly.

== Illinois State Representative ==
=== Committees ===
During her tenure in the Illinois House of Representatives, Flowers served on several different committees covering a range of topics and issues in the House of Representatives. Below is a list of her historical committee assignments.

As of 2024, Flowers had no committee assignments.

Representative Flowers' Previous Committee Assignments
Committee Name	General Assembly
Health Care Availability & Accessibility (Chair)	101st, 100th, 99th, 98th, and 97th
Health Care Availability & Access (Chair)	90th through 96th
Health & Healthcare Disparities	99th, 98th, 97th and 96th
Health Care & Human Services	89th
Healthy Illinois Plan	93rd
Prescription Drug Affordability	101st
Youth & Young Adults	99th
Economic Justice & Equity	100th
Economic Opportunity	100th
Medicaid Reform	96th
Medicaid Reform, Family & Children	96th
Human Services	90th through 101st, and 84th
The Disabled Community	92nd
Restorative Justice	100th, 99th, and 98th
Economic Development & Housing	99th
Higher Education	100th, 99th, 98th, 97th, 96th, 95th, and 84th
Juvenile Justice & System-Involved Youth	99th
Small Business Empowerment & Workforce Development	99th and 97th
Accountability & Administrative Review	98th
Environmental Health	97th
Special Investigative Committee	96th and 95th
Agriculture & Conservation	97th and 96th
Smart Growth & Regional Planning (Vice Chair)	95th
Department of Children & Family Services Oversight	95th
Drivers Education & Safety	95th
International Trade & Commerce	94th
Fee For Services Initiatives	94th and 93rd
Special Committee and Tobacco Settlement Proceeds	92nd
Special Committee on Tobacco Settlement Proceeds Distribution	91st
Children & Youth	92nd and 91st
Labor and Commerce	87th, 86th, 85th, and 84th
Commerce & Business Development (Vice Chair)	93rd and 92nd
Financial Institutions	89th, 86th and 85th
Consumer Protection	89th
Insurance (Minority Spokesperson)	89th
Executive	88th, 87th and 86th
Public Utilities (Vice Chair)	88th, 87th, 86th, and 85th
Real Estate Law (Chair)	87th
Registration & Regulation	87th, 86th, and 85th
Museums, Arts& Cultural Enhancement	100th and 98th
Implementation of Chicago School Reform	86th
Appropriations – Elementary & Secondary Education (Vice Chair)	94th and 93rd
Appropriations – Human Services	90th and 87th
Appropriations Higher Education	97th and 96th
Appropriations II	86th, 85th, and 84th
Appropriations – General Services	88th
Public Utilities	Minority Spokesperson for 88th, Vice Chair for 87th, 86th, and 85th
Small Business	85th and 84th
Housing	85th
World's Fair 1992	84th

=== Legislation ===
Flowers' primary legislative focus was on health and child welfare matters. She was the principal sponsor of legislation related to medical patients rights, medical managed care reform, health insurance reforms, hospital and nursing home staffing standards, licensure of direct-entry midwives, adverse health event reporting, health facility regulatory reform, medical and dental practice reforms, and public health/communicable disease control.

Flowers was the primary sponsor of several laws, including:

Representative Flowers' Passed Legislation
Bill Number; Public Act Number	Description
HB 68; PA 102-0256	Requires each hospital to report the number of female patients who died during a given reporting period on a quarterly basis under the Hospital Report Card Act.
HB 88; PA 102-0178	Requires that an otherwise eligible person shall be eligible to receive TANF cash assistance regardless of whether they have been convicted of a drug-related offenses.
HB 728; PA 102-0414	Increases the number of birth center facilities that may be licensed under the Alternative Health Care Delivery Act
HB 1779; PA 102-0203	Requires Medicaid and private health insurance companies to provide coverage for medically-indicated biomarker testing.
HB 2914; PA 102-0451	Requires DCFS to submit an annual report to the General Assembly detailing racial disparities in DCFS involvement during the previous fiscal year.
HB 3267; PA 102-0470	Creates the Advisory Commission on Reducing the Disproportionate Representation of African-American Children in Foster Care
HB 3914; PA 102-0617	Requires each State agency to establish the goal of increasing diversity on interview panels in order to increase State employment opportunities provided to women, minority persons, and specified other persons.
HB 5013; PA 102-0964	A law to increase access to choices during pregnancy, birth, and the 12 months postpartum; requires Medicaid health plans to reimburse out-of-network providers for any pregnancy-related health care service covered by the Illinois Medicaid program. Permits licensed Certified Professional Midwives to provide services at any facility licensed under Illinois’ Birth Center Licensing Act.
HB 1; PA 101-38	A task force to reduce infant and maternal mortality rates for African Americans
HB 2433; PA 101-0091	A law requiring every hospital to maintain on-site the proper instruments for taking a pregnant patient's blood pressure.
HB 3129; PA 101-0103	A law that narrows criteria under which Illinois Department of Human Services may discontinue a family's TANF benefits; excludes 75% of TANF grants from becoming subject to penalty reductions.
HB 347; PA 101-182	A law to make it more difficult for individuals convicted of elder abuse to recover from their victims’ estates
HB 2438; PA 101-386	A law requiring health insurance companies to cover mental health services for postpartum depression
HB 2895; PA 101-390	A law requiring all birthing facilities to comply with mandatory continuing education about the management of severe maternal hypertension and obstetric hemorrhage. Mandates IDPH to develop an initiative to reduce peripartum racial and ethnic disparities, in collaboration with the Illinois Perinatal Quality Collaborative.
HB 2; PA 101-445	A law affirming that all pregnant women have certain health care rights during labor and delivery
HB 3; PA 101-0446	A law requiring each hospital to report to IDPH facility-level racial disparities in maternal child health outcomes, including: preterm birth, infant mortality, and maternal mortality.
HB 5; PA 101-447	A law to ensure access to substance use services for pregnant and postpartum women
HB 3511; PA 101-512	Maternal Mental Health Conditions Education, Early Diagnosis, and Treatment Act
HB 2896; PA 101-273	Diversity in Health Care Professions Task Force
HB 2800; PA 100-265	The Perinatal HIV Prevention Act
HB 736; PA 100-347	Establishment of a small business grant program for low-income individuals who are interested in becoming entrepreneurs
SB 1696; PA 100-459	Illinois Muslim American Advisory Council Act
HB 163; PA 99-84	A law prohibiting the Illinois State Board of Education from having separate performance standards for students based on race or ethnicity
SB 1775; PA 99-351	Safeguard Our Children Act
HB 3284; PA 99-416	Opportunities for At Risk Women Act
HB 105; PA 97-280	Patients' Right to Know Act
HB286; PA 97-245	Administration of Psychotropic Medications to Children Act
SB 1157; PA 94-242	Public Health Program Beneficiary Employer Disclosure Law
SB 1157; PA 94-242	Illinois Adverse Health Care Events Reporting Law of 2005
SB251; PA 91-617	Managed Care Reform and Patient Rights Act
HB4999; PA 94-885	Fair Patient Billing Act
SB 59; PA 93-563	Hospital Report Card Act
HB612; PA 94-407	Illinois Family Case Management Act
HB 8; PA 98-1050	A law assuring pregnant women job security through "reasonable accommodation"
HB 81; PA 93-540	Re-branding free-standing "Emergent" Care Centers
HB 486; PA 93-981	A law that prohibits hospitals from promulgating policies or implementing practices that determine differing standards of obstetrical care based on patient's source of payment or ability to pay
HB 192; PA 95-0282	A law requiring the Illinois Department of Public Health to effect policies and procedures to monitor and control infections from MDRO's (Multi-drug resistant organisms), MRSA (Methicillin-resistant Staphylococcus aureus) and Clostridium, especially as these impact health care facilities
HB 890; PA 84-462	A law requiring the Illinois Department of Public Health to develop hospital standards of perinatal care which assure that families are provided information to assist in obtaining special education for children with disabilities
HB 3999; PA 96-411	A law that rebranded existing programs into the Golden Apple Scholars of Illinois
HB 2942; PA 85-1313	A law that established March 4 as a commemorative holiday for Chicago School District 299 to be known as Mayors' Day, when past chief executive officers of Chicago are honored, particularly Richard J. Daley and Harold Washington

Representative Flowers supported universal health care, and repeatedly filed related legislation and conducted public hearings to promote such reforms throughout her legislative career – House Bill 311, The Illinois Universal Health Care Act – of the 97th General Assembly is the primary model.

Flowers emphasized the safety of children in substitute care within the child welfare system regulated and administered by the Illinois Department of Children and Family Services, an agency and system that has experienced repeated tragedies and the subject of continuous judicial oversight.

Flowers received several awards during her tenure, including 1993 "Legislator of the Year" award from Illinois Alcoholism and Drug Dependence Association, which became the Illinois Association for Behavioral Health Care.

== Personal life ==
Flowers was married to Daniel Coutee; the couple have one daughter, Makeda. Coutee died in September 2019. Flowers also has two grandchildren.

== Electoral history ==
Illinois 31st State House District Democratic Primary, 1984
Party	Candidate	Votes	%
Democratic	Mary E. Flowers	11,494	52.08
Democratic	Peggy Smith Martin	5,544	25.12
Democratic	James A. Moore, Jr.	5,034	22.81
Total votes		22,072	100.0

Illinois 31st State House District General Election, 1984
Party	Candidate	Votes	%
Democratic	Mary E. Flowers	32,273	100.0
N/A	Write-ins	1	0.00
Total votes		32,274	100.0

Illinois 31st State House District Democratic Primary, 1986
Party	Candidate	Votes	%
Democratic	Mary E. Flowers (incumbent)	13,139	84.27
Democratic	Taylor Pouncey	1,453	9.32
Democratic	Charles L. Meeks	1,000	6.41
Total votes		15,592	100.0

Illinois 31st State House District General Election, 1986
Party	Candidate	Votes	%
Democratic	Mary E. Flowers (incumbent)	20,778	97.09
Republican	Mildred J. Thompson	622	2.90
Total votes		21,400	100.0

Illinois 31st State House District General Election, 1988
Party	Candidate	Votes	%
Democratic	Mary E. Flowers (incumbent)	29,723	100.0
Total votes		29,723	100.0

Illinois 31st State House District Democratic Primary, 1990
Party	Candidate	Votes	%
Democratic	Mary E. Flowers (incumbent)	11,639	77.39
Democratic	Monica Faith Stewart	2,296	15.26
Democratic	David Whitehead	416	2.76
Democratic	Marvin S. Douglas Jr.	346	2.30
Democratic	Larry Williams	341	2.26
Total votes		15,038	100.0

Illinois 31st State House District General Election, 1990
Party	Candidate	Votes	%
Democratic	Mary E. Flowers (incumbent)	15,900	100.0
Total votes		15,900	100.0

Illinois 21st State House District Democratic Primary, 1992
Party	Candidate	Votes	%
Democratic	Mary E. Flowers	14,580	61.70
Democratic	Pamela James Strain	3,318	14.04
Democratic	Dorothy Cooks	1,948	8.24
Democratic	Bernetta Pearson	1,920	8.12
Democratic	Ken Bennett	1,863	7.88
Total votes		23,629	100.0

Illinois 21st State House District General Election, 1992
Party	Candidate	Votes	%
Democratic	Mary E. Flowers	35,721	87.05
Republican	Charles P. Janulis	5,316	12.95
Total votes		41,037	100.0

Illinois 21st State House District General Election, 1994
Party	Candidate	Votes	%
Democratic	Mary E. Flowers (incumbent)	21,868	87.89
Republican	Kirk J. Surridge	3,013	12.11
Total votes		24,881	100.0

Illinois 21st State House District General Election, 1996
Party	Candidate	Votes	%
Democratic	Mary E. Flowers (incumbent)	32,623	92.82
Republican	Melvin R. Sexton	2,524	7.18
Total votes		35,147	100.0

Illinois 21st State House District Democratic Primary, 1998
Party	Candidate	Votes	%
Democratic	Mary E. Flowers (incumbent)	13,522	99.63
Democratic	Diana B. Haywood	50	0.37
Total votes		13,572	100.0

Illinois 21st State House District General Election, 1998
Party	Candidate	Votes	%
Democratic	Mary E. Flowers (incumbent)	27,728	100.0
Total votes		27,728	100.0

Illinois 21st State House District General Election, 2000
Party	Candidate	Votes	%
Democratic	Mary E. Flowers (incumbent)	32,340	100.0
Total votes		32,340	100.0

Illinois 31st State House District Democratic Primary, 2002
Party	Candidate	Votes	%
Democratic	Mary E. Flowers	17,933	100.0
Total votes		17,933	100.0

Illinois 31st State House District General Election, 2002
Party	Candidate	Votes	%
Democratic	Mary E. Flowers	25,333	87.92
Republican	C. A. Lofton	3,481	12.08
Total votes		28,814	100.0

Illinois 31st State House District General Election, 2004
Party	Candidate	Votes	%
Democratic	Mary E. Flowers (incumbent)	36,909	100.0
Total votes		36,909	100.0

Illinois 31st State House District General Election, 2006
Party	Candidate	Votes	%
Democratic	Mary E. Flowers (incumbent)	25,042	100.0
Total votes		25,042	100.0

Illinois 31st State House District General Election, 2008
Party	Candidate	Votes	%
Democratic	Mary E. Flowers (incumbent)	36,087	100.0
Total votes		36,087	100.0

Illinois 31st State House District General Election, 2010
Party	Candidate	Votes	%
Democratic	Mary E. Flowers (incumbent)	24,772	100.0
Total votes		24,772	100.0

Illinois 31st State House District General Election, 2012
Party	Candidate	Votes	%
Democratic	Mary E. Flowers (incumbent)	36,765	100.0
Total votes		36,765	100.0

Illinois 31st State House District General Election, 2014
Party	Candidate	Votes	%
Democratic	Mary E. Flowers (incumbent)	26,394	100.0
Total votes		26,394	100.0

Illinois 31st State House District General Election, 2016
Party	Candidate	Votes	%
Democratic	Mary E. Flowers (incumbent)	36,904	100.0
Total votes		36,904	100.0

Illinois 31st State House District Democratic Primary, 2018
Party	Candidate	Votes	%
Democratic	Mary E. Flowers (incumbent)	14,077	82.78
Democratic	Willie Preston	2,929	17.22
Total votes		17,006	100.0

Illinois 31st State House District General Election, 2018
Party	Candidate	Votes	%
Democratic	Mary E. Flowers (incumbent)	30,214	100.0
Total votes		30,214	100.0

Illinois 31st State House District Democratic Primary, 2020
Party	Candidate	Votes	%
Democratic	Mary E. Flowers (incumbent)	13,449	71.78
Democratic	Samantha Simpson	5,287	28.22
Total votes		18,736	100.0

Illinois 31st State House District Democratic Primary, 2024
Party	Candidate	Votes	%
Democratic	Michael Crawford	7,663	69.09
Democratic	Mary E. Flowers (incumbent)	3,428	30.91
Total votes		11,091	100.0
