= Howard B. Brookins Sr. =

American politician (born 1932)

Howard Beamon Brookins Sr. (born June 6, 1932) is an American politician who served as a Democratic member of the Illinois General Assembly serving in the House from 1983 to 1987 and from the Senate from 1987 to 1993.

Born in Chicago, Illinois, Brookins went to DuSable High School and Kennedy–King College. He then served in the United States Army during the Korean War. Brookins then went to Chicago State University and Cortez Peters Business School. He served in the Chicago Police Department and went to the Worsham School of Mortuary Sciences. Brookins owned the Brookins Funeral Home. After the Cutback Amendment, in the 1982 Democratic primary, Brookins defeated one incumbent won a three-way race to win the Democratic nomination in the newly created 36th district. After her unsuccessful congressional campaign, the district's other Democratic incumbent Monica Faith Stewart ran as an Independent against Brookins in the general election. Brookins served in the Illinois House from 1983 to 1987.

In the 1986 Democratic primary, Brookins defeated incumbent Senator Glenn V. Dawson. Brookins served in the Illinois Senate from 1987 to 1993. In the 1992 Democratic primary, Senator Emil Jones defeated Brookins after Republicans gerrymandered the two into the same district.
