= Samuel C. Maragos =

American politician

Member of the Illinois Senate
- In office November 1, 1976 – December 3, 1980
- Succeeded by: Glenn Dawson

Member of the Illinois House of Representatives
- In office 1969 – November 1, 1976

Personal details
- Born: Samuel Constantine Maragos; August 19, 1922 Sioux City, Iowa, U.S.
- Died: August 23, 2005 (aged 83)
- Party: Democratic
- Spouse: Cleo Mavrick
- Children: 4
- Education: Bowen High School; University of Chicago (BA); John Marshall Law School (JD)
- Profession: Politician, lawyer

Military service
- Allegiance: United States
- Branch/service: United States Army
- Rank: Second lieutenant
- Battles/wars: World War II

Samuel Constantine Maragos (August 19, 1922 – August 23, 2005) was an American politician from Illinois who served as a Democratic member of the Illinois General Assembly from 1969 to 1980.

== Biography ==
Maragos was born in Sioux City, Iowa on August 19, 1922. His family moved to Chicago where he was educated at Phil Sheridan Elementary and Bowen High School. During World War II, Maragos served in the United States Army, eventually being discharged as a second lieutenant. He graduated from the University of Chicago in 1943 with a Bachelor of Arts and from John Marshall Law School in 1948 with a Juris Doctor. Maragos was active in the Greek American community as National President of the Pan Arcadian Federation of America and in the leadership of the Hellenic Democratic Club of Illinois. He and his wife Cleo Mavrick had four children.

Maragos was sworn into the Illinois House of Representatives in 1969 where he served until his appointment to the Illinois Senate on November 1, 1976. Maragos resigned from the Illinois Senate on December 3, 1980. He was succeeded by Glenn Dawson. He served as a judge for the Cook County Circuit Court from 1992 until his retirement in 1995. He died on August 23, 2005.
