= William W. Powers State Recreation Area =

Public park in Chicago, Illinois

- IUCN category V (protected landscape/seascape)
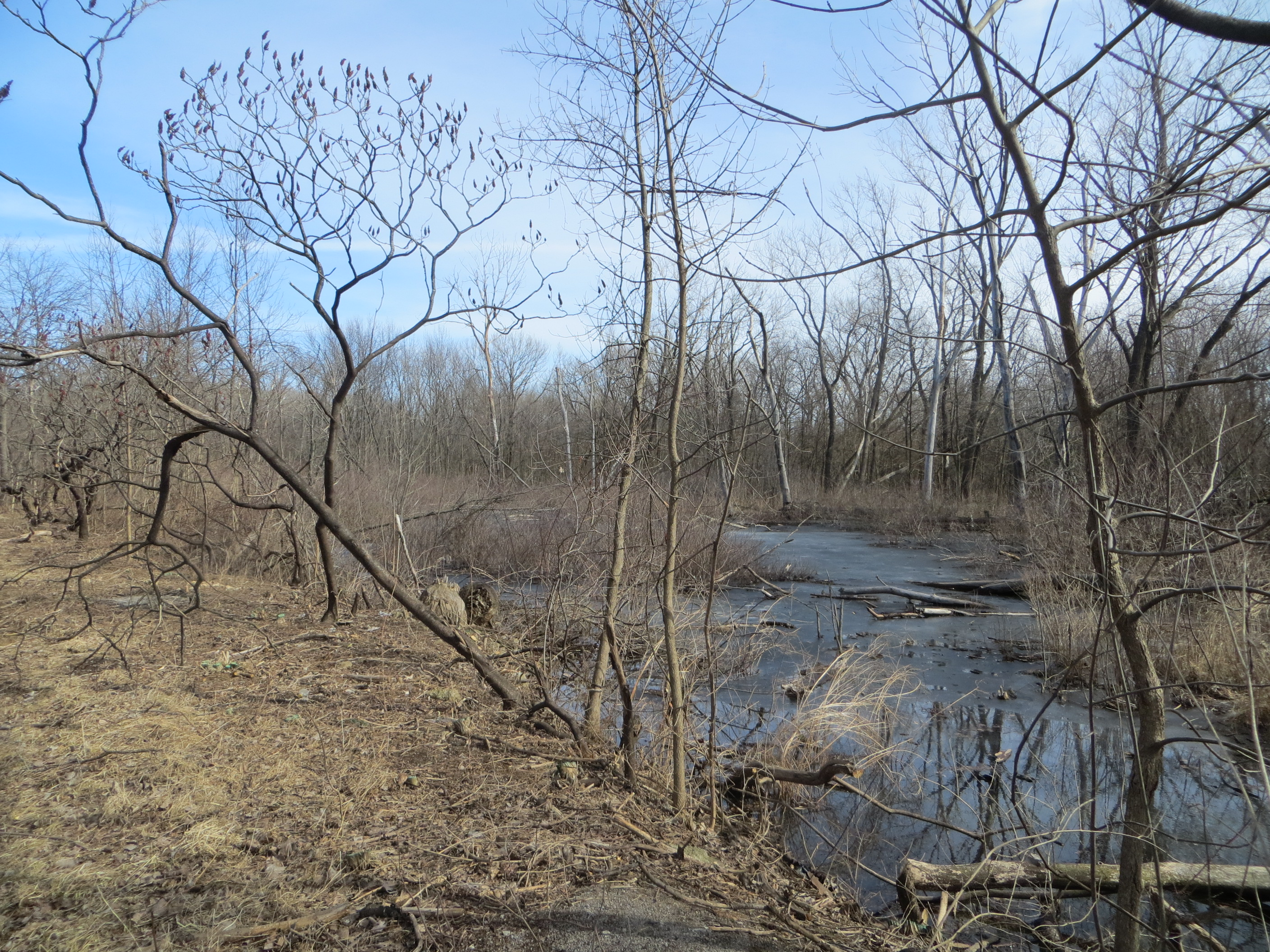

- Location within Illinois Location within the United States
- Location: Chicago, Cook County, Illinois, United States
- Nearest city: Chicago, Illinois
- Coordinates: 41°40′01″N 87°31′57″W
- Area: 580 acres (230 ha)
- Established: 1947
- Governing body: Illinois Department of Natural Resources
- Website: dnr.illinois.gov/parks/park.williamwpowers.html

William W. Powers State Recreation Area is an Illinois state park administered by the Illinois Department of Natural Resources on 580 acres (230 ha) in the Hegewisch community area of the City of Chicago in Cook County, Illinois, United States. The area includes 419 acres (170 ha) of water in Wolf Lake that provides about 6 miles (10 km) of shoreline to fishermen. The park hosts about half a million visitors annually. The park contains numerous species, and is one of the most important biological sites in the Chicago region.

== History ==
Wolf Lake in Illinois has a storied history that somehow has lost track of the origins of the name that goes back over 150 years. Part of this history includes visits by Abraham Lincoln in which Mary Todd Lincoln nearly drowned. In 1947, the state acquired a 160 acres (65 ha) parcel known as the Wolf Lake State Recreation Area. Later acquisitions were added to the property and have increased the area which was known as Wolf Lake Conservation Area. In 1965, the Illinois General Assembly named the area after William W. Powers. Powers had been a Chicago alderman on the Chicago City Council and Illinois General Assembly legislator in the 1920s, and used the site for picnics to feed the needy during the Great Depression.

The park also has a military history. There is a defunct Nike Ajax missile honoring the missile site that occupied the area during the Cold War years. Memorial Day, Independence Day, and Veterans Day ceremonies attract veterans who place flags at markers near a former re-dedication ceremony site that featured the Moving Vietnam Wall.

Unlike the Lake Michigan shoreline which has been reshaped by sand and clay, Wolf Lake has been filled in large part with slag from steel mills.

== Wildlife ==
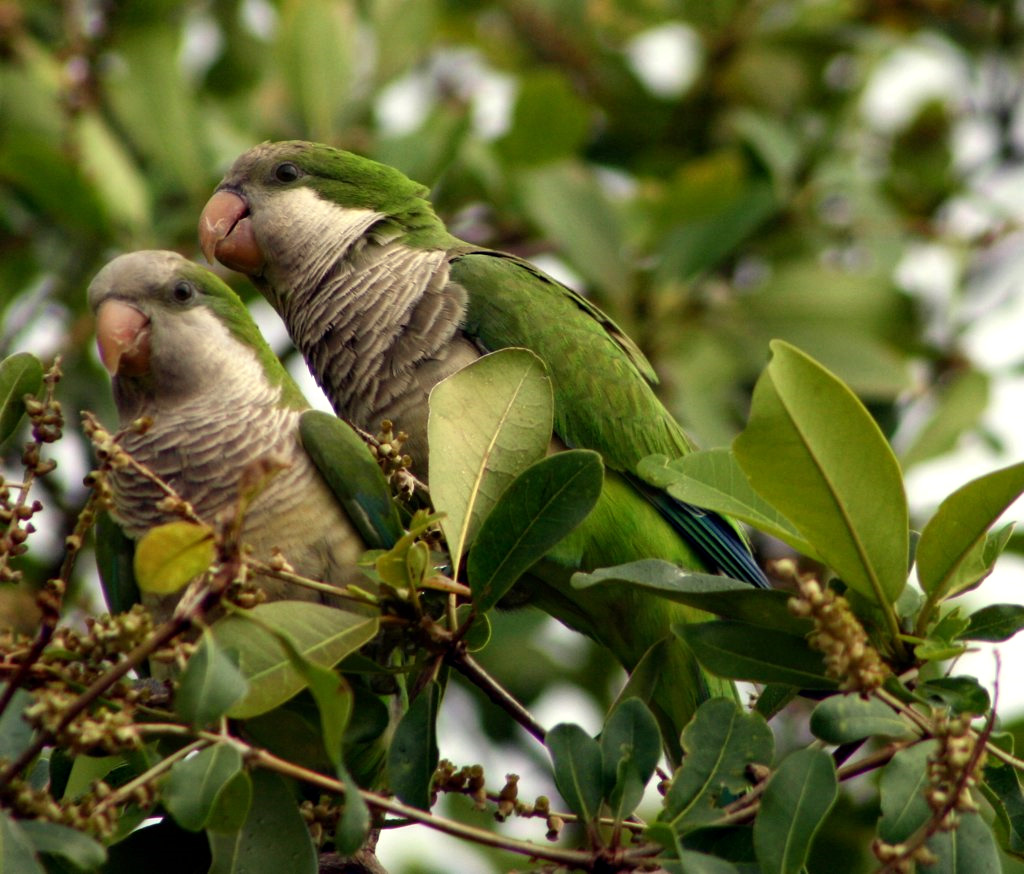
Monk parakeets can be found in the park

Wolf Lake contains largemouth bass, northern pike, bluegill, redear sunfish, crappie, bullhead, carp, walleye, hybrid muskie, and yellow perch. There is also an occasional salmon and rainbow trout caught in the lake. Salmon can access the lake via the Calumet River and its Indian Creek tributary.

Native trumpeter (Cygnus buccinator) and tundra swans (Cygnus columbianus) and non-native mute swans (Cygnus olor) may all be found on the lake in winter. Tundra swans are absent in summer as they migrate to the arctic and subarctic to nest, however, the non-native, Eurasian mute swans compete for habitat with the non-migrating trumpeter swan population and is an impediment to restoration of the native trumpeters around the Great Lakes. Additional native birds hosted by the lake include cardinals, blue jays, finches, orioles, woodpeckers, teal, mallards, resident and migratory Canada geese, and an occasional bald eagle.

Birdwatchers enjoy the non-native monk parakeet, which is a South American parrot, that nests in the park. Hunters enjoy the seasonal waterfowl. The South American monk parakeets arrived at the site in 1999 and have since established two nests with seven or eight birds each. They are presumed to have migrated from the Hyde Park community area.

The park contains many willow and cottonwood trees.

The park also attracts city dwelling mammals such as squirrels, rabbits, raccoons, muskrats, opossums, and the occasional coyote and white-tailed deer. Beaver sign indicates that there are beaver on the lake currently.

On August 23, 2002, Wolf Lake was one of three neighboring regions that hosted the Calumet BioBlitz. This bioblitz convened over 150 expert scientists to identify and record as many living organisms as possible within 24 hours. The purpose was to demonstrate the resilience of the extraordinary range of organisms in nature's battle against the South Side of Chicago's collage of factories, warehouses, forest preserves, residences, and highways as well as its battle of survival against killer pest species. Unofficially, the BioBlitz counted 1,815 species. The BioBlitz included teams of scientists from Eastern Illinois University, Field Museum, Forest Preserve District of Cook County, Illinois Natural History Survey, Indiana Department of Natural Resources, University of Illinois - Champaign, U.S. Environmental Protection Agency, and U.S. Fish & Wildlife.

Lake sturgeon, endangered in both Indiana and Illinois, as well as banded killifish, threatened in Illinois, are both part of the Wolf Lake ecology. The lake supports the nesting habitat for four species of endangered birds: little blue heron, yellow-crowned night heron, black-crowned night heron, and yellow-headed blackbird.

== Conservation ==
The U.S. Army Corps of Engineers and the Illinois Water Survey are studying ways to halt degradation of the lake and the USDA Forest Service is helping with a study of public interests in recreation at Wolf Lake. The Wolf Lake water level determines the drainage to Lake Michigan because the connecting Calumet River flows southward during elevated levels and northward during lowered levels. The water in Wolf Lake was about 18 inches higher until 1998 when the Illinois Department of Natural Resources removed several beavers and their dams that had been built across Indian Creek. The subsequent drop in water depth encouraged weed growth and changed fishing conditions.

The Illinois Department of Natural Resources and the City of Hammond, IN initiated the Reconnaissance Report in December 1998. It was approved in September 2000. An environmental assessment was held in 2002. The Project Cooperation Agreement commenced in 2005. The Wolf Lake ecosystem degradation problem is multifaceted. It includes exotic plant species proliferation, low diversity of plant and fish species, water depth inadequacy, poor aquatic habitat, contaminant impact, and shoreline erosion. Proposed project features include new aquatic and wetland habitat plantings; shoreline restoration; creating deep holes to locally diversify the lake bottom; herbicidal and biological controls; channels clearing, and dikes and causeways construction to restore natural water levels.

== Use ==
The park offers stoves and has shelters available by reservation for picnicking. Two of the shelters each have capacity for 50 people, and two others each have capacity for 100 people. Fishing and hunting is permitted in accordance with regulations, but camping is not allowed. Ice fishing is permitted in the winter and 10 horsepower (7.5 kW) motorboats are permitted during the summer. The lake has several dikes that temper the wave height. There are 25 hunting blinds to hunt waterfowl. These sites are awarded in yearly lotteries held in late July. During the season, daily drawings are held to allocate blinds of absentee blind holders.

The use of the park is protected by several types of volunteers. For example, at the 14th Annual Earth Day Wolf Lake Cleanup on April 21, 2001, more than 350 volunteers, including Hammond, IN Mayor Duane Dedelow Jr., helped clean up and remove an estimated 36,000 pounds (16 t) of waste. A week later, Friends of Wolf Lake and associates collected more than 3,000 discarded tires from the lake and its shoreline. Semi-annual cleanups are organized by the Southeast Sportsmen's Club and the Wolf Lake Rod and Gun Club who work with the scouts, community organizations and the Hegewisch Chamber of Commerce.

== Geography ==
Wolf Lake extends across the Illinois and Indiana State line between 120th and 134th streets. It is an 804 acres (325 ha) lake that has 419 acres (170 ha) within the city of Chicago and the remainder in the city of Hammond. Its maximum depth is 20 feet (6.1 m). Wetlands adjacent to the lake include the 250 acres (100 ha) Eggers Woods Forest Preserve, 175 acres (71 ha) Powderhorn Lake Prairie, and 40 acres (16 ha) Hyde Lake Wetland. William W. Powers State Recreation Area is on Chicago's far southeast side, off highways 94, 90, and 41. The main park entrance is at 12949 South Avenue O.

At one time, the Wolf lake was connected to Lake Michigan by a creek running through Hammond on the Indiana side, but the creek has long since been blocked by development. On the Illinois side, Wolf Lake empties into Indian Creek, which feeds into the Calumet River. The Illinois and Indiana are separated by State Line Road, which is a road elsewhere along the border, but it is only represented by a rock-and-gravel dike that passes through the lake. State Line Road ends in foot bridges where water enters from the Indiana side.

== See also ==
- Wolf Lake (Indiana–Illinois)
