= Calumet Park =

- U.S. National Register of Historic Places
- U.S. Historic district
- Chicago Landmark
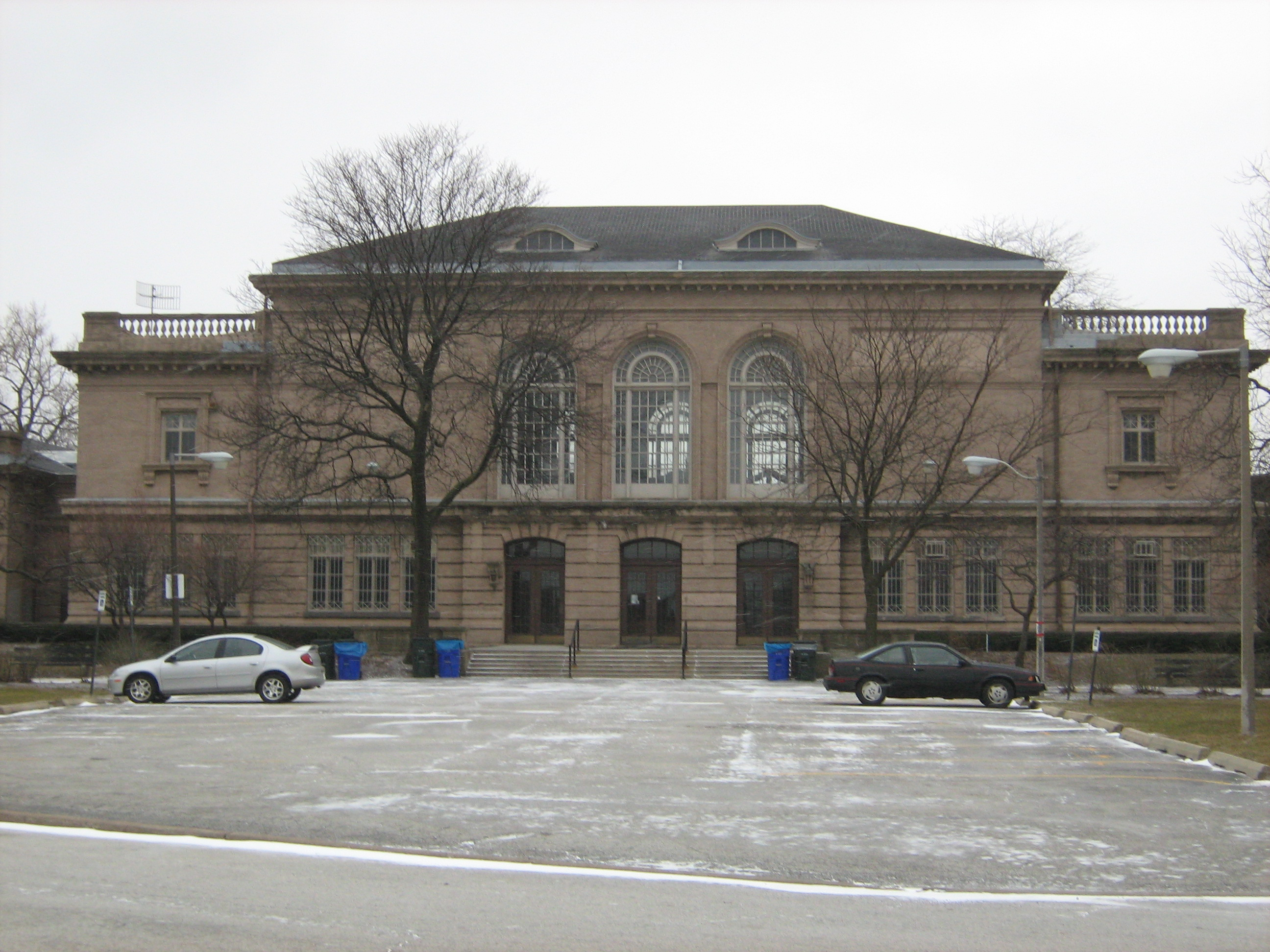
- Calumet Park Fieldhouse

- Location within Greater Chicago Location within Illinois Location within the United States
- Location: 9801 South Avenue G Chicago, Illinois
- Coordinates: 41.7179°N 87.5294°W
- Built: 1905, 1924
- MPS: Chicago Park District MPS
- NRHP reference No.: 03000788

Significant dates
- Added to NRHP: August 21, 2003
- Designated CHICL: October 4, 2006

Calumet Park is a 198-acre (79-hectare) urban park in Chicago, Illinois. Providing access to Lake Michigan from the East Side neighborhood on the city's Southeast Side, the park contains approximately 0.9 miles (1.5 km) of lake frontage from 95th Street to 102nd Street, which extends to the city limits at Illinois' border with Indiana. The park is listed on the National Register of Historic Places.

== History ==
Calumet Park is named after the Calumet River and the Calumet Region of southeast Chicago and northwestern Indiana drained by the river. Planning for Calumet Park began in 1904 with the initial acquisition of 40 acres (160,000 m^{2}) of land. The Olmsted Brothers, a noted firm of urban landscape architects, drew up initial plans for landscaping the proposed new park; however, as a result of the swelling population of the East Side and a consensus that the original plans were inadequate, further land acquisitions were made, the Olmstead plans were revised, and facilities were built.

The original park opened in 1905, but was later enlarged; a fieldhouse was erected in 1924 at 98th Street and Avenue G. In the 1930s, Calumet Park attained its current size of 198 acres (0.80 km^{2}). There are lakefront beaches at 96th, 98th, and 99th Streets. What is planned to be a nearly 60 mile biking and hiking trail around the southern end of Lake Michigan to New Buffalo, Michigan starts in the park -- as of 2024 about 25 miles of the Marquette Greenway have been completed in various sections.

The park was listed on the National Register of Historic Places in August 2003. On October 4, 2006, the fieldhouse became a Chicago Landmark.

== State line ==
The junction of the Illinois–Indiana border with the shoreline of Lake Michigan stands close to the southern tip of Calumet Park. Some feet offshore from the park's beaches, the boundary line separating the jurisdictions of the two states continues northward into the lake.
