= Michael Crawford (politician) =

Illinois politician

Member of the Illinois House of Representatives from the 31st district
- Incumbent
- Assumed office January 8, 2025
- Preceded by: Mary Flowers

Personal details
- Born: December 29, 1982 (age 43)
- Party: Democratic
- Education: Northern Illinois University (BS) (MSEd); Saint Xavier University (MBA); Concordia University Chicago (PhD)

Michael Crawford (born December 29, 1982) is a Democratic member of the Illinois House of Representatives for the 31st district. Elected in November 2024, he assumed office on January 8, 2025.

== Early life and career ==
Crawford was born in Chicago, Illinois. He graduated from Lane Tech College Prep High School in 2001. He went on to Northern Illinois University where he earned a bachelor's degree in Operations and Information Management and a master's degree in Adult and Higher Education. Crawford subsequently earned an MBA from Saint Xavier University and a Ph.D. in Higher Education Leadership from Concordia University Chicago. He is a member of Phi Beta Sigma fraternity.

Prior to joining the Illinois General Assembly, Crawford worked at several higher education institutions in the state including Northern Illinois University, Benedictine University City Colleges of Chicago, Chicago State University and The Chicago School.

== Illinois House of Representatives (2025–present) ==
Crawford was sworn in as State Representative for the 31st district on January 8, 2025, for the 104th General Assembly.

=== Legislation ===
In his first session, Crawford sponsored and co-sponsored several bills focused on education, child welfare, student rights, and consumer protection. Notable legislation includes:

- HB 1366 – Amends the Children with Disabilities Article of the School Code. Requires schools to provide written notice to parents or guardians of a child with disabilities that they have the right to invite individuals with relevant expertise, advocates, or IEP facilitators to meetings. Also requires the State Board of Education to distribute information about the IEP facilitation process. Public Act 104–0047.
- HB 2435 – Amends the Telephone Solicitations Act to prohibit telephone solicitation via automatic dialing systems, auto-dialers, or programs mimicking human operators without express consent; limits duration of consent to one year, allows withdrawal, and provides for damages of $500 per violation plus costs and attorney's fees.
- HB 2907 – The Child Welfare Disclosure Act. Establishes rights for parents involved with Illinois child welfare services, including being consulted about placement options, timely visits, and being provided a copy of the Act at case opening. Public Act 104–0254.
- HB 3258 – Prohibits institutions of higher education from maintaining or enforcing policies that require unpaid student teaching for preservice teachers. Public Act 104–0316.
- Senate Bill 407 – Establishes a Chronic Absence Task Force to study the impact of the COVID-19 pandemic on chronic absence in schools and develop strategies to address continuing challenges. Public Act 104–0355.
- Senate Bill 408 – Ensures that student records documenting supportive disability services are accessible to the Illinois Department of Human Services (DHS) for use when securing healthcare services as an adult. Public Act 104–0356.

=== Committee assignments ===
As of September 23, 2025, Representative Crawford serves on the following Illinois House committees:

- Adoption & Child Welfare (HACW)
- Appropriations – Higher Education (HAPI)
- Health Care Availability & Access (HHCA)
- Gun Violence Prevention (HGVP)
- Restorative Justice & Public Safety (SHRJ)
- State Government Administration (HSGA)
