= Bowen High School (Chicago) =

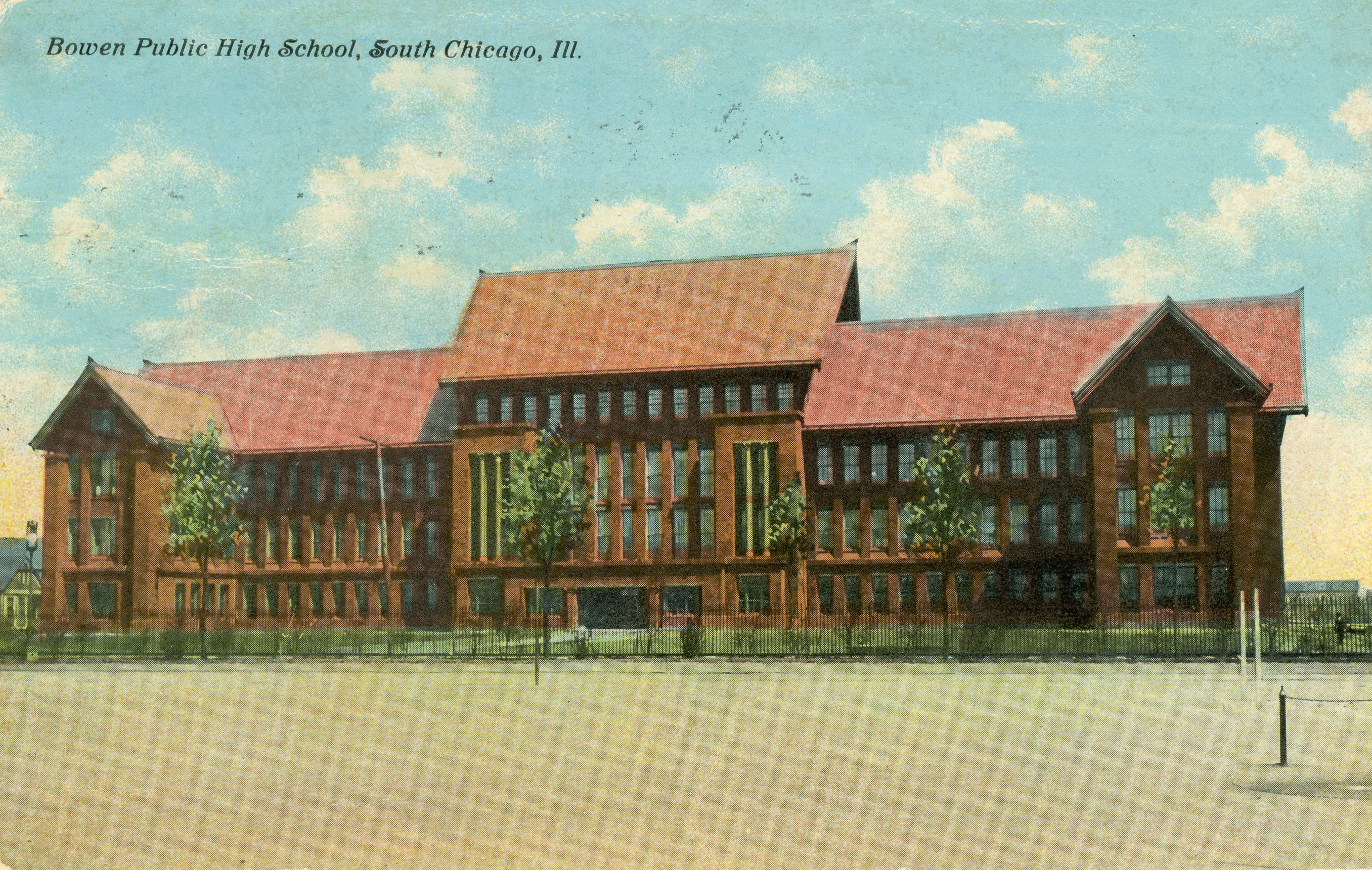

Location
- 2710 E. 89th Street; Chicago, Illinois 60617; United States; 41°44′04″N 87°33′26″W

Information
- School type: Public; Secondary
- Motto: "Education stops, Not at the close of a book, But at the end of one's life."
- Opened: 1876; 1910 (present building)
- School district: Chicago Public Schools
- CEEB code: 140882
- Principal: Priscilla Horton
- Grades: 9–12
- Gender: Coed
- Enrollment: 261 (2023–2024)
- Campus type: Urban
- Colors: Purple; Gold
- Athletics conference: Chicago Public League
- Mascot: Boilermakers
- Newspaper: Bowen Arrow
- Yearbook: Bowenite
- Website: bowen.cps.edu

James H. Bowen High School is a public four-year high school located in the South Chicago neighborhood on the south side of Chicago, Illinois, United States. Bowen is operated by the Chicago Public Schools district. From 1993 until 2011, Bowen was divided into four smaller schools. Today, the smaller schools have been re-consolidated back into one school.

== History ==
Bowen High School was established in 1882, under the name South Chicago High School in one of the classrooms of the Bowen Elementary School (demolished), which was located at the northwest corner of 93rd Street and Houston Avenue in the then-independent community of South Chicago. Fourteen pupils were given high school-level instruction. The elementary school and its successor high school were named for Colonel James Harvey Bowen, the first president of the Calumet and Chicago Canal Dock Company and the man known as "the father of South Chicago".

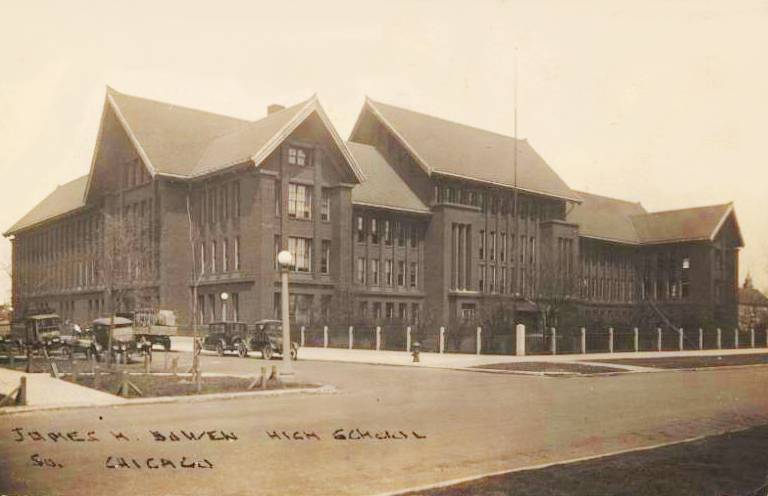
A 1910 photograph of the current building which was designed by Dwight Perkins.

The two schools became separate institutions in 1910, when the current building was constructed at the northeast corner of Marquette and 89th Street. It was designed by Dwight Perkins (1867–1941), supervising architect of the Chicago Public School system between 1905 and 1910, and built "on identical plans" as its more famous cousin, Irving Park High School. (opened as Carl Schurz High School The latter building was listed on the National Register of Historic Places in 2011, and the Bowen School building was added in 2026. The building cost $700,000 and contained about 125 rooms; it was noted for its manual training and domestic science departments. By the 1930s, Bowen's student body had grown to 4,600, due to the great increase in immigrants of Polish and Slavic descent in the South Chicago area.

== Athletics ==
Bowen competes in the Chicago Public League (CPL) and is a member of the Illinois High School Association (IHSA). Bowen sport teams are called the Boilermakers.

The boys' baseball team were Public League champions in the 1953–54 and the 1971 season. The boys' soccer team were Public League champions three times (1979–80, 1980–81 and 1981–82). The boys' football team were Blue Division champs in 1963 defeating Harlan 19-18. They were Blue Division Champs back to back in 1981, 1982 and 1983 defeating Harlan each time and in 1984 they moved up to the Red Division.

== Notable alumni ==
- Jon Burge – (1965), Chicago Police Department officer, convicted of torturing over 200 men into giving false confessions.
- Phil Collins – former MLB player (Chicago Cubs, Philadelphia Phillies, St. Louis Cardinals)
- Andrew Davis – film director.
- Johnny Drake - football player
- Eli Grba – former baseball player who pitched in the 1960 World Series as a member of the New York Yankees.
- Bill Haarlow – early professional basketball player.
- Roy Henshaw - former big-league left-handed pitcher who went 33-40 in parts of eight seasons (1933, 1935-1938, 1942–1944) in the majors, most notably with the Chicago Cubs.
- Billy Holm – former MLB player (Chicago Cubs, Boston Red Sox).
- Joni James – MGM Records star who sold more than 100 million singles and albums worldwide beginning in 1952, four years after graduating from Bowen.
- Gene Krupa – drummer.
- Edward M. Lerner – science fiction author and technologist.
- Samuel C. Maragos, member of the Illinois General Assembly.
- Kenneth Mars - actor (The Producers, Malcolm in the Middle)
- Tony Piet – baseball player for the Chicago White Sox
- Earl W. Renfroe - orthodontist
- Ed Schwartz –radio host who worked at WIND, WGN, and WLUP in Chicago.
- Marc Smith – creator of slam poetry.
- Ed Winceniak – former MLB player (Chicago Cubs).
