= John Pope (alderman) =

Chicago City Council alderman

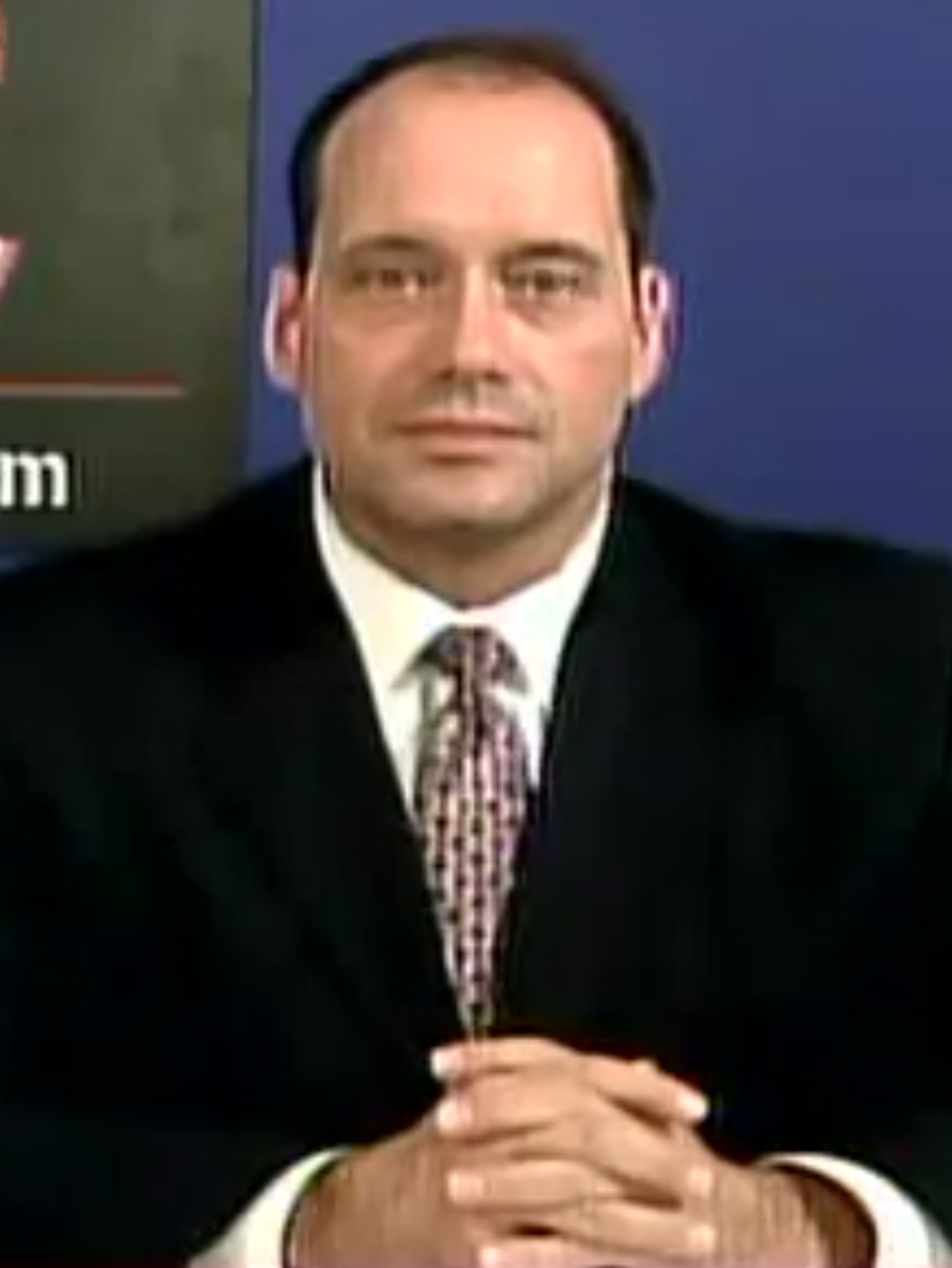

City of Chicago Alderman from the 10th ward
- In office May 1999 – May 2015
- Preceded by: John J. Buchanan
- Succeeded by: Susan Sadlowski Garza

Personal details
- Party: Democratic
- Education: Wabash College (B.A.)
- Profession: Politician

John Pope is a former Chicago City Council alderman from the 10th ward of the City of Chicago. He was first elected in 1999 and served four terms, the last of which ended in 2015 when he lost an election to Alderman Susan Sadlowski Garza in 2015.

== Early life ==
A lifelong resident of the 10th Ward, Pope attended Mount Carmel High School. He earned his undergraduate degree in Economics, from Wabash College in Indiana.

== Career ==
Pope worked for several years in Chicago's budget department, serving also as Director of Demolition in the Building Department and Director of Conservation, before later joining Mayor Richard M. Daley's staff as Daley's assistant.

=== Aldermanic career ===
Pope was first elected in 1999 after defeating business owner Robert Wisz to succeed the retiring John Buchanan. Pope was elected to his second term in 2003, when he ran unopposed, and again in 2007. He was again reelected in 2011. Pope lost reelection to Susie Sadlowski Garza in 2015.

As an alderman, Pope served on a number of committees: Buildings; Economic & Capital Development; Energy, Environmental Protection and Public Utilities; Housing and Real Estate; and Police and Fire.

In January 2008, Pope hired a former Streets and Sanitation worker, using a payroll account available to aldermen with no scrutiny, who was on a list of employees who should not be re-hired, as he had resigned after the city recommended firing him for allegations of sexually harassing a co-worker. Pope defended the hiring, explaining that the worker had resigned without admitting guilt and that he was a hard worker with knowledge about the area. Pope also hired the mother of Al Sánchez, leader of the Hispanic Democratic Organization which helped get Pope elected. Sánchez was a former Commissioner of the City of Chicago's Department of Streets and Sanitation who in 2008 had been convicted for rigging city hiring so that Mayor Daley's supporters would be rewarded.

=== Post-aldermanic career ===
In August 2015, mayor Rahm Emanuel appointed Pope as a deputy commissioner in the city's Department of Water Management.
