= KCBX Terminals =

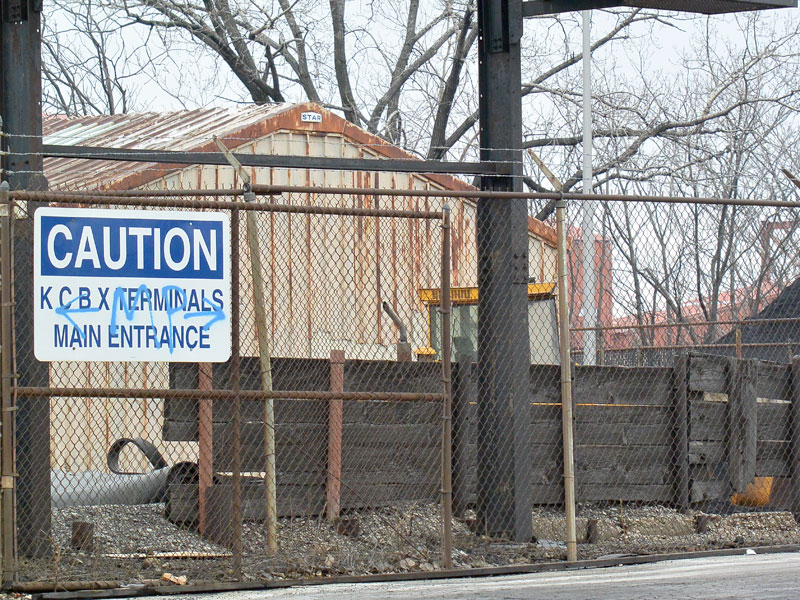
KCBX Terminals sign

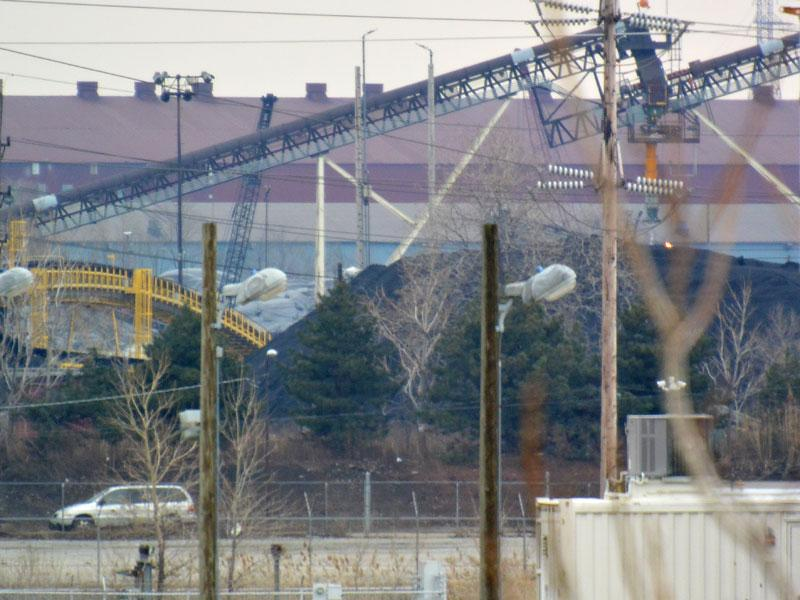
A passing car shows the scale of a petroleum coke pile on Chicago's South Side.

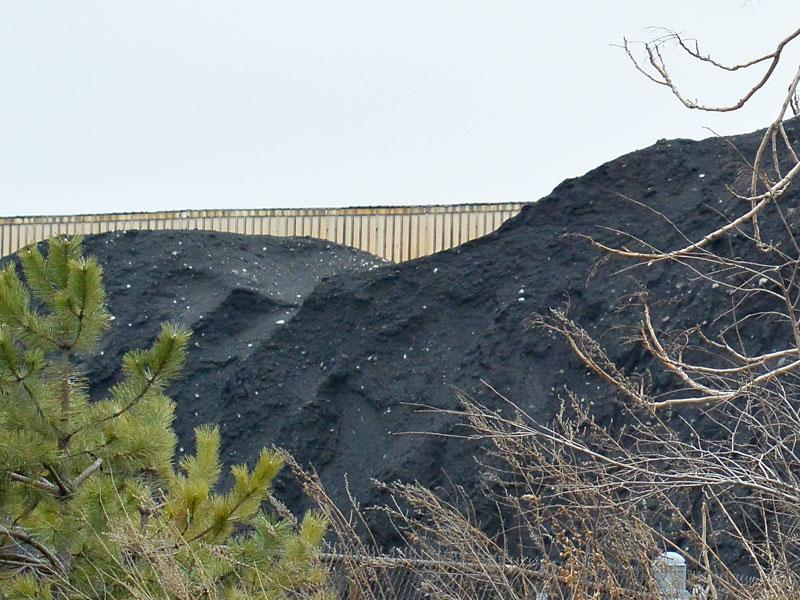
Close-up view of a pet coke pile on Chicago's south side.

KCBX Terminals is a petcoke, coal, salt, slag, cement, and clinker processing facility and ocean freight docking and loading services facility owned by Koch Industries located in Hegewisch, Chicago.

== Pollution and protests ==
Residents around the facility have claimed that dust blowing from the facility into their neighborhood is making them sick. On April 12 and May 8 of 2014, KCBX was found to be in violation of air quality standards. In 2014, the company announced that it would build an enclosure to the land by 2016 at a cost of $120 million. After requests for a time extension, it was announced in 2015 that the plant would be closed in late 2015. The site currently handles over 11 million tons of petcoke per year. In 2017, it was reported that the facility was a manganese polluter.

There have been numerous protests to close the plant.
