= Samuel Panayotovich =

American politician (born 1946)

Samuel "Sam" Panayotovich (July 6, 1946) is a former American politician.

Born in Hammond, Indiana, Panayotovich received his bachelor's degree in business administration from Southern Illinois University, Carbondale. He also received his teacher's certificate from University of Indiana. Panayotovich lived in Chicago, Illinois. From 1983 to 1989, Panayotovich served in the Illinois House of Representatives as a Democrat and then as a Republican. He then served as the chief of the Illinois Liquor Control Commission. Panayotovich also worked as a lobbyist.

After his legislative tenure he moved to Lansing, Illinois. As a Republican, he served as a member of the Illinois Republican Party's Central Committee from Illinois's 2nd congressional district. He was the party's nominee for Cook County Circuit Clerk, and ran for the Republican nomination for Illinois's 11th congressional district in 1992 and in 1994. In 1999, he became the Executive Director of the Illinois Liquor Control Commission. His wife Cynthia served on the Chicago Transit Authority's board from 2002 to 2009 and his son Sam is a sports reporter.

== Notes ==
Preceded by District created	Member of the Illinois House of Representatives from the 35th district 1982-1989	Succeeded by Clem Balanoff
