= Wolf Lake Speedway =

Racing venue in Indiana

- Location: Hammond, Indiana
- Coordinates: 41°40′22.1″N 87°30′48.6″W
- Opened: July 16, 1933
- Closed: 1936

Oval
- Surface: Sand
- Length: 1 miles

Midget track
- Surface: Dirt and oil
- Length: 0.2 miles

Wolf Lake Speedway was a racing venue located in Hammond, Indiana. The speedway opened on July 16, 1933, and operated until 1936. The track was described as "the World’s Most Unique Automobile Race Course."

Wolf Lake Speedway contained two tracks. One track was a one-mile (1.6 km) sand track that was completely surrounded by Wolf Lake. A portion of the lake was drained to allow for the track's construction. This track hosted auto racing, while speedboat racing was held in the lake in the vicinity of the track. The other was a 1/5-mile (0.32 km) dirt and oil surfaced midget track, constructed in 1935, located between Wolf Lake and Calumet Avenue. Midget car racing took place at this track, with the opening race on June 9, 1935, and races continuing until 1936.

Among the drivers who raced at Wolf Lake Speedway were Emil Andres, Frank Brisko, Duke Nalon, Harold Shaw, Jimmy Snyder, and Tony Willman.

In 1935, Wolf Lake Speedway hosted a series of weekly Amateur Athletic Union boxing matches.
