= George Washington High School (Chicago) =

Location
- 3535 E. 114th Street; Chicago, Illinois 60617; United States; 41.6874°N 87.5384°W

Information
- School type: Public Secondary
- School district: Chicago Public Schools
- Principal: Samuel Davis
- Teaching staff: 102.00 (FTE)
- Grades: 9–12
- Gender: Coed
- Enrollment: 1,568 (2022-23)
- Student to teacher ratio: 15.37
- Campus type: Urban
- Colors: Red; White; Blue
- Athletics conference: Chicago Public League
- Team name: Patriots (males) / Lady Patriots (females)
- Accreditation: North Central Association of Colleges and Schools
- Website: gwashingtonhs.org

George Washington High School is a public four-year high school located in the East Side neighborhood on the far southeast side of Chicago, Illinois, United States. Washington is operated by the Chicago Public Schools district. Washington serves the students of nearby neighborhoods: Hegewisch, South Deering. The school is named for the first President of the United States, George Washington.

== Athletics ==
Washington competes in the Chicago Public League (CPL) and is a member of the Illinois High School Association (IHSA). Washington sport teams are nicknamed Patriots. The boys' basketball team were regional champions in 2005–06 and 2006–07. The boys' soccer team were IHSA Regional Champions in 2009–10, 2010–11, 2011–12, 2012–13, 2013–14, 2014–15, 2015–16, 2017–18, 2020–2021, 2021-2022, 2022-2023. IHSA Sectional Champions in 2012–13, 2014–15, 2015–16, 2017–18, 2020–2021. IHSA Supersectionals Champions in 2012–13, 2014–15, 2020–2021. The girls' basketball team were Public League champions in 1990–91 and 1999–2000. The girls’ softball team were Public League Champions in 1993-94, 1994–95, 1995–96, and 1996-97. They were the first public league team to have four consecutive trips to state and one of two teams in Illinois history to do so the other being Stagg High School (suburban) who accomplished this feat the same four years. Their starting pitcher in 1997 hit the first out of the park homerun by a public league player in state competition. The boys soccer team won the IHSA State Championship in 2012–13. The Boys soccer team finished 4th place in IHSA state in 2015–16. The Boys soccer team placed 3rd place in IHSA state in 2020–2021. The Boys soccer team were the Chicago Public League Champions for the first time in 2016–17. The boys soccer team were runner ups for the Chicago Public League in 2017-2018 and 2020–2021.
