= Wolf Lake (Indiana–Illinois) =

Lake in Indiana and Illinois, United States

- Location of Wolf Lake on Indiana/Illinois state line
- Location: Hegewisch, Chicago, Illinois and Hammond, Indiana
- Coordinates: 41°39′57″N 87°31′39″W
- Primary outflows: Indian Creek into Calumet River
- Basin countries: United States
- Managing agency: Hammond Port Authority and Illinois Department of Natural Resources
- Surface area: 804 acres (325 ha) (total); 385 acres (156 ha) (Indiana); 419 acres (170 ha) (Illinois)
- Average depth: 5.95 ft (1.81 m) (overall); 4.80 ft (1.46 m) (Indiana); 6.64 ft (2.02 m) (Illinois)
- Max. depth: 18.2 ft (5.5 m) (Indiana); 18.4 ft (5.6 m) (Illinois)
- Water volume: 5,573 acre⋅ft (6,874,000 m^{3}) (total); 2,743 acre⋅ft (3,383,000 m^{3}) (Indiana); 2,830 acre⋅ft (3,490,000 m^{3}) (Illinois)
- Residence time: 0.58 years
- Shore length^{1}: 24.77 mi (39.86 km) (total); 12.34 mi (19.86 km) (Indiana); 12.43 mi (20.00 km) (Illinois)
- Surface elevation: 584 ft (178 m)
- ^{1} Shore length is not a well-defined measure.

Wolf Lake is an 804-acre (325.4 ha) lake that straddles the Indiana and Illinois state line near Lake Michigan. It is smaller than it was prior to settlement by European colonizers because of infilling for development around the edges. Despite years of environmental damage caused by heavy industries, transportation infrastructure, urban runoff and filling of wetlands, it is one of the most important biological sites in the Chicago region.

Wolf Lake is located between Hammond, Indiana and the Hegewisch community area of Chicago, Illinois. It was once connected by an open channel to Lake Michigan on the Indiana side of the lake, but this channel was cut off for development on its northern side. Indianapolis Boulevard (U.S. 41) and various railroad and industrial facilities are located in former wetlands on the northeastern side of the lake where it once connected to Lake Michigan. There are currently proposals to reopen a channel between Wolf Lake and Lake Michigan. The Illinois portion of the lake consists of five, interconnected impoundments separated by dikes. The dikes were constructed in the late 1950s so that separate portions of the lake could be drained for the purpose of dredging for fill to use in the construction of the Chicago Skyway. The western impoundments are now part of the William W. Powers State Recreation Area and are drained by Indian Creek to the Calumet River. The Wolf Lake water level determines the drainage to Lake Michigan because the connecting Calumet River flows southward during elevated levels and northward during lowered levels. The Indiana portion of the lake consists of three, interconnected impoundments that are also separated by dikes. The longest dike, running roughly parallel to State Line Road and traversing the entire length of the lake, contains railroad tracks belonging to the Indiana Harbor Belt.

The Indiana Toll Road (Interstate 90) runs through the middle of the lake just inside the Indiana state line. The lake is also transected by a number of railroad causeways, some of them no longer in use. Indiana Harbor Belt Railroad has an active spur line that runs through the Illinois side of the lake in the Hegewisch community area. Calumet Avenue (U.S. 41) is on its eastern side, with a strip of parkland in between. There are currently several large industrial properties adjacent to the lake and on filled wetlands adjoining the lake, including Cargill and Unilever on the north side. Other property near the edge of the lake is being used for housing. A significant portion of the property around the lake is now parkland or nature preserve, including the Eggers Woods parcel of the Forest Preserve District of Cook County.

Other neighboring lakes include Lake George, Lake Calumet, Powderhorn Lake and Lake Michigan. There was also another lake that lay to the west between Wolf Lake and the river. It was called Hyde Lake and was filled in by Republic Steel. A swampy area near 130th Street and the railroad tracks is the only remnant of that lake.

== History ==
Wolf Lake in Illinois has a storied history that somehow has lost track of the origins of the name that goes back over 150 years. Part of this history includes visits by Abraham Lincoln in which Mary Todd Lincoln nearly drowned.

In 1924, the body of Bobby Franks was found in a culvert just northwest of the lake. Franks was the victim of the so-called "thrill killers," Leopold and Loeb – the subjects of what was termed the "Trial of the Century." It's well known that Chicagoland gangsters used to dispose of bodies in this lake system as well.

From 1933 to 1936, Wolf Lake Speedway was located within the lake, in Hammond, Indiana. The track was completely surrounded by the water of Wolf Lake, and a portion of the lake was drained to allow for its construction.

=== Nike Missile Site (C-44) ===
During the Cold War, two areas around the lake were used to create Nike missile site C-44, part of an air defense system for Chicago and its heavy industries. It was one of many such sites that formed a ring of defense running from Indiana to Wisconsin.

Both areas were decommissioned in the 1970s and have since been converted into preservation and recreation areas. On the northwest side of the lake, several hundred acres of wetlands were filled with ferrous slag in order to create the actual site for the missiles. This is currently Eggers Woods, part of the Cook County Forest Preserve system. The southwest side of the lake housed the site's radar station and has been converted into the William W. Powers State Recreation Area in Illinois.

== Ecology ==
Wolf Lake, along with the other neighboring lakes, was once among the most biologically diverse places in the Midwest. Eighty years ago, the naturalist Donald Culross Peattie described Wolf Lake as one of North America's preeminent natural areas, "…a famous hunting ground for aquatic wildlife...where the plants form one of the most remarkable assemblages of aquatics in the country...no body of water of equal size can boast such a list." It is still a diverse area. On August 23, 2002, more than 150 experts in botany, zoology and related ecological fields assembled at Wolf Lake and in the surrounding forest, prairie and marshland to identify and record as many living organisms as possible within a single 24-hour period. The purpose of this undertaking, known as the Calumet Bioblitz, was to document the biodiversity of green pockets that have survived within the urban and industrial landscape south of Chicago.

The water in Wolf Lake was about 18 inches higher until 1998 when the Illinois Department of Natural Resources removed several beavers and their dams that had been built across Indian Creek. The subsequent drop in water depth encouraged weed growth and changed fishing conditions. Beaver signs indicate that there are beavers on the lake currently.

=== Fish ===
Wolf Lake is home to the endangered Lake sturgeon (Acipenser fulvescens) and the threatened Banded killifish (Fundulus diaphanus).

=== Birds ===
The lake and neighboring wetlands provide nesting sites for the endangered black-crowned night heron, little blue heron, yellow-crowned night heron and yellow-headed blackbird. Native Trumpeter (Cygnus buccinator) and Tundra swans (Cygnus columbianus) and non-native Mute swans (Cygnus olor) may all be found on the lake in winter. Tundra swans are absent in summer as they migrate to the arctic and subarctic to nest, however, the non-native, Eurasian Mute swans, which stay in the area year round, compete for habitat with the non-migrating Trumpeter swan population and is an impediment to restoration of the native trumpeters around the Great Lakes.

=== Flora ===
The endangered false golden sedge (Carex garberi), little green sedge (Carex viridula) and the threatened marsh speedwell (Veronica scutellata) are plants that grow in the neighboring wetlands.

== Ecosystem restoration ==
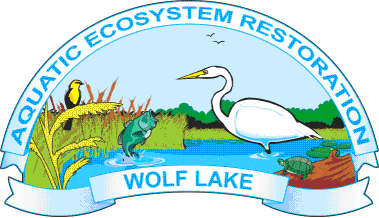

A $7.25 million ecosystem restoration project for Wolf Lake was carried out by the Chicago District of the U.S. Army Corps of Engineers, with the support of the Illinois Department of Natural Resources and the City of Hammond. Completed in September 2007, the project sought to improve the overall quality of the lake ecosystem for native species. Natural water levels in the lake were restored by clearing channels and creating openings in dikes and causeways. Additional habitat was created by constructing approximately 25 acres (10 ha) of new aquatic and wetland habitat plantings. Also, approximately 5,000 feet (1,500 m) of shoreline was restored, deep holes were created to locally diversify the lake bottom, and herbicidal and biological controls were implemented to control aquatic and shoreline exotic and undesirable plant species. While for many years it was commonplace for park visitors to feed the ducks and other birds that lived at the lake, this produced an unnaturally and unsustainably large population, as well as many non-native birds such as domesticated breeds of ducks and geese. It is no longer permitted that visitors feed wildlife and as a result the populations have dropped to a sustainable and natural population.

== See also ==
- William W. Powers State Recreation Area
