= Clem Balanoff =

American politician (born 1953)

Member of the Illinois House of Representatives from the 32nd district 35th district (1989-1993)
- In office January 1989 – January 1995
- Preceded by: Sam Panayotovich
- Succeeded by: Constance A. Howard

Personal details
- Born: Clement Balanoff, Jr. April 16, 1953 (age 73) Chicago, Illinois
- Party: Democratic
- Spouse: Virginia
- Children: Two
- Education: Ripon College

Clement Balanoff, Jr. is an American politician and the national political director for the Amalgamated Transit Union. He served as a Democratic member of the Illinois House of Representatives from 1989 to 1995.

== Biography ==
He was born April 16, 1953, in Chicago to a politically active family. His father Clem Balanoff, Sr. was a prominent union organizer and his mother Miriam Balanoff would become a circuit court judge. In 1981, Clem moved to California for five years, where he worked as an aide for Congressman Matthew Martínez and later Congressman Esteban Torres. He returned to Illinois to take a job as the 10th Ward Superintendent, responsible for garbage pickup and other city services. A year later when Ed Vrdolyak defected to the Republican Party, Balanoff became the Democratic Committeeman for the 10th ward.

In 1988, he defeated incumbent Sam Panayotovich, who had defected to the Republican Party with Vrdolyak. In 1991, he ran for Alderman in a field of ten opponents losing to John Buchanan, who previously served in the role in the 1960s and 1970s. In 1994, he was one of five candidates who ran in the Democratic primary to succeed retiring incumbent George Sangmeister. Frank Giglio, a fellow member of the Illinois House, won the Democratic primary. Giglio was defeated in the general election by Jerry Weller. In 1996, Balanoff was Weller's opponent losing by a three percentage point margin. He explored a rematch in 1998, but chose to run for a seat on the Cook County Board of Review instead before dropping out prior to the primary.

His post-electoral career has included stints as Chief of Staff to the Cook County Clerk, a strategist for the mayoral campaign of Chuy García and Illinois state director for the presidential campaign of Vermont Senator Bernie Sanders.

At the 2016 Democratic National Convention Balanoff read the vote totals for Senator Sanders' Illinois campaign. As of August 2017, Balanoff is the executive director for the Illinois chapter of Our Revolution; a pro-Sanders organization. Balanoff served as the co-chair of Ameya Pawar's campaign for Chicago City Treasurer in the 2019 municipal election and served as the campaign manager of Abdelnasser Rashid's unsuccessful campaign for the Democratic nomination for the Cook County Board of Review's 1st district. As of 2020, Balanoff is the national political director of the Amalgamated Transit Union.
