= St. Josaphat Roman Catholic Church (Chicago) =

Coordinates: 41°55′25.1″N 87°39′46.8″W

St. Josaphat Church
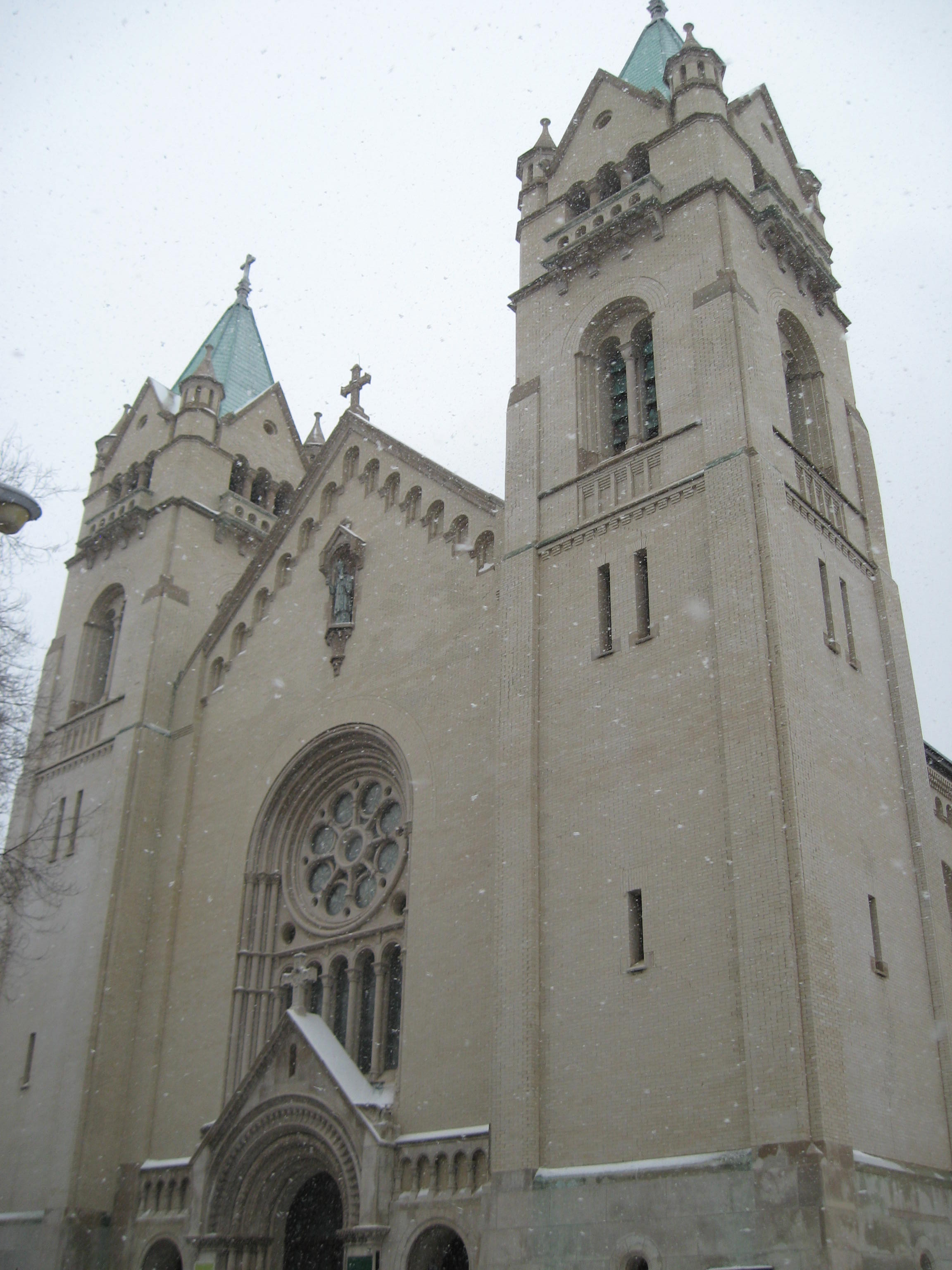

- Location within the United States
- Location: Chicago
- Country: United States
- Denomination: Roman Catholic
- Website: St. Josaphat's Parish

History
- Founded: 1884
- Founder: Polish immigrants
- Dedication: St. Josaphat

Architecture
- Functional status: Active
- Heritage designation: For Polish Kashubians immigrants
- Architect: William J. Brinkmann
- Architectural type: Church
- Style: Romanesque Revival
- Groundbreaking: 1899
- Completed: 1902
- Construction cost: $125,000 (1902)

Specifications
- Materials: Brick

St. Josaphat (Polish: Kościół Świętego Jozafata and in Kashubian as Kòscół Swiãtégò Jozafata) is a historic church of the Roman Catholic Archdiocese of Chicago located at 2311 North Southport Avenue in Chicago, Illinois.

It is a prime example of the so-called 'Polish Cathedral style' of church in both its opulence and grand scale. St. Josaphat's two massive Romanesque belltowers are a hallmark view of the Lincoln Park skyline.

== History of Saint Josaphat's Parish ==
The congregation dates back to 1882, when a 13-member committee of Chicago's Kashubian Polish community formally approached the Resurrectionist Father Vincent Barzynski, then Chicago's preeminent Polish priest, for his assistance in establishing a Kashubian parish. Prior to this most of the Kashubian families had been attending Mass at Saint Michael's Parish, a "German" parish which they preferred to Father Barzynski's own "Polish" parish of Saint Stanislaus Kostka. The current combination church-school building, an imposing brick edifice, was dedicated on May 22, 1884.

The parish attracted Polish settlement in this area of the Lincoln Park neighborhood of Chicago, many of them also of Kashubian descent, as part of what is called the Kashubian diaspora. In 1902, Saint Josaphat claimed about 5,000 parishioners. This concentration led to the neighborhood being referred to as Kaszubowo by local Poles.

By 1980, roughly half of Saint Josaphat's 450 families self-identified as Polish American, and 30% self-identified as Mexican American. Today, Saint Josaphat's serves a predominately young, white, urban professional congregation. The church still hosts over 65 weddings a year.

== Architecture ==
The Romanesque church, built at a cost of $125,000 in 1902, was designed by William J. Brinkmann, who also drew plans for the Neogothic masterpiece of St. Michael the Archangel in South Chicago.

== See also ==
- Kashubians
- Polish Cathedral style churches of Chicago
- Polish Americans
- Poles in Chicago
- Roman Catholicism in Poland

== Church in architecture books ==
- Sinkevitch, Alice (2004). The AIA Guide to Chicago. Harvest Books.
- Schulze, Franz; Harrington, Kevin (2003). Chicago's Famous Buildings. University Of Chicago Press.
- McNamara, Denis R. (2005). Heavenly City: The Architectural Tradition of Catholic Chicago. Liturgy Training Publications.
- Chiat, Marylin (2004). The Spiritual Traveler: Chicago and Illinois: A Guide to Sacred Sites and Peaceful Places. HiddenSpring.
- Lane, George A. (1982). Chicago Churches and Synagogues: An Architectural Pilgrimage. Loyola Press.
- Kantowicz, Edward R. (2007). The Archdiocese of Chicago: A Journey of Faith. Booklink.
- Kociolek, Jacek (2002). Kościoły Polskie w Chicago {Polish Churches of Chicago} (in Polish). Ex Libris.
