= Church of the Immaculate Conception (Chicago) =

Church in Chicago, Illinois, US

Coordinates: 41.7358°N 87.5518°W

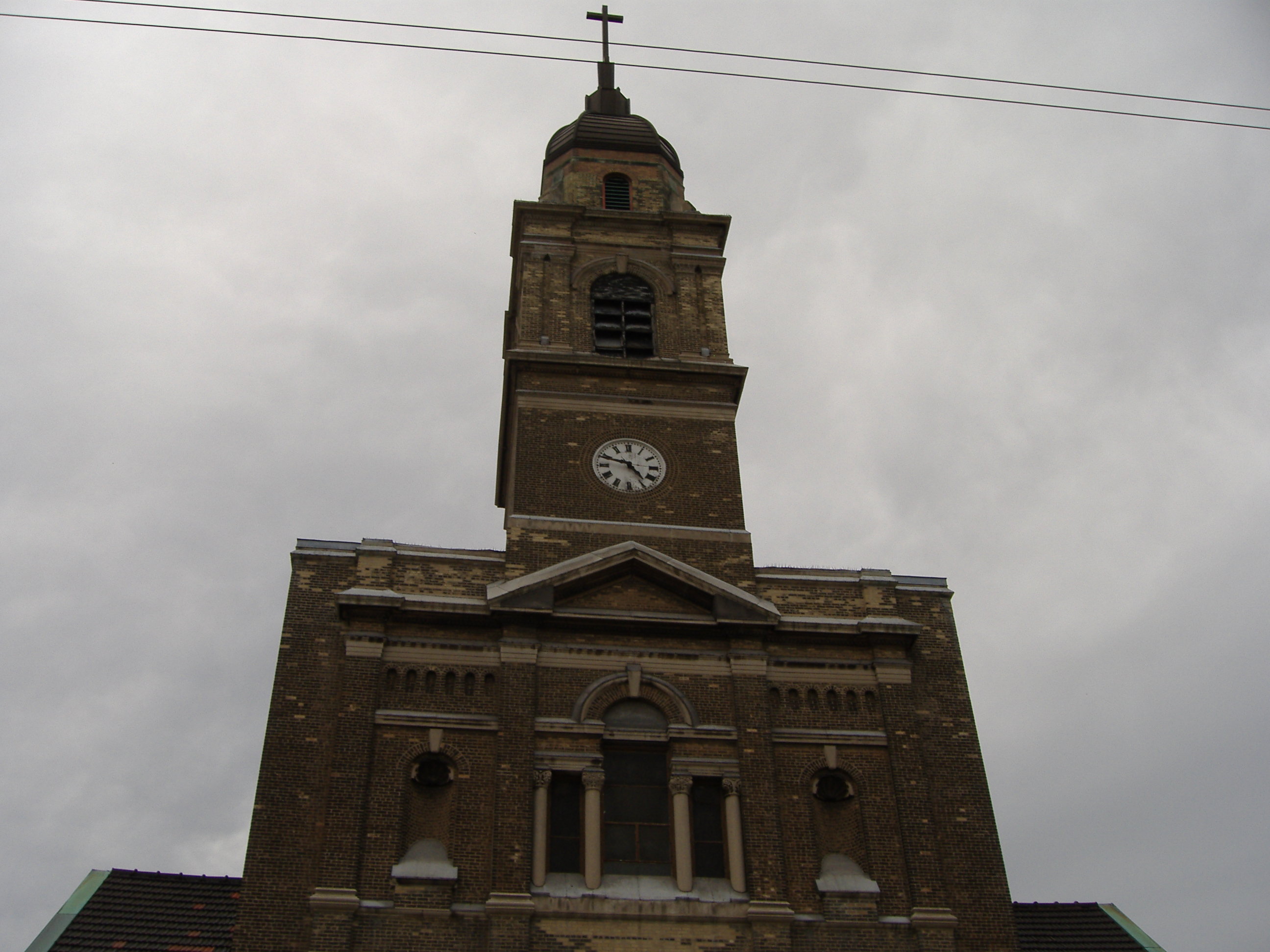
The Church of the Immaculate Conception in Chicago.

The Church of the Immaculate Conception, referred to in Polish as Kościół Niepokalanego Poczęcia Najświętszej Maryi Panny, is a historic church of the Roman Catholic Archdiocese of Chicago located at 2944 East 88th Street in Chicago, Illinois. It is a prime example of the so-called 'Polish Cathedral style' of churches in both its opulence and grand scale. Along with St. Michael's, it is one of the two monumental Polish churches dominating the South Chicago skyline.

== History ==
Founded in 1882 as a Polish parish, Immaculate Conception was the first Polish parish in the working-class steel mill district of South Chicago, but it was divided three times to form the Polish parishes of St. Michael the Archangel, St. Bronislava and St. Mary Magdalene. The parish school operated from 1882 through 1982 when it closed because of declining enrollment. It reopened in 1998 under the direction of the Daughters of Mary Immaculate of Guadalupe.

== Architecture ==
The church building, designed by Martin A. Carr was completed in 1899. Like many of Chicago's Polish Cathedrals, its Renaissance Revival style recalls the glory days of the Polish–Lithuanian Commonwealth in the 15th and 16th centuries. The church was restored in 2002, with new altars designed by Franck & Lohsen of Washington, D.C., and a new plaza was added north of the church.

== See also ==
- Tadeusz Żukotyński, Catholic painter and mural artist
- Sr. Maria Stanisia, Polish-American painter and restorer
- Jozef Mazur, Polish-American painter and stained glass artist
- Polish Cathedral style churches of Chicago
- Polish Americans
- Poles in Chicago
- Polish Roman Catholic Union of America
- Roman Catholicism in Poland
