= William J. Brinkmann =

William J. Brinkmann (12 August 1871 – 24 February 1911, Chicago), sometimes spelled Brinkman, was an architect known for his work designing Chicago area churches.

A son of German immigrants, he was born and raised in Chicago and received his architectural training at the firm of Burnham and Root, where he eventually supervised the construction of Chicago's Masonic Temple, a skyscraper that was the world's tallest building at the time of its completion in 1892. After a tour of Europe to further his architectural knowledge, Brinkmann settled in California where for a few years he designed homes for political and industrial notables such as Ulysses S. Grant Jr.

His contemporaries described him as a "staunch Catholic."

After returning to Chicago, Brinkmann made a name for himself designing churches, including St. Josaphat's, St. Michael's in the South Chicago neighborhood of Chicago near the Indiana border, St. Mary's in Buffalo Grove, and, most notably, the mausoleum and chapel for the Archbishops of Chicago in Mount Carmel Cemetery. He was one of the three architects involved in the design of Our Lady of Sorrows Basilica. He also designed exhibits for his former employer, Daniel Burnham, for the World's Columbian Exposition in 1893, as well as some of the earliest large steel frame buildings in Atlanta, San Francisco and Chicago.

Brinkmann's death was unexpected, gruesome and mysterious: his mangled, decapitated body was found on train tracks near 73rd street in February 1911. The intrigue surrounding his death fed front-page newspaper accounts for several days, positing theories that Brinkmann had perhaps committed suicide after several years of illness, yet contradictory evidence prevented an inquest from finding a clear reason for his death or a finding of murder. His funeral was held at St. Leo's Church on 78th Street, a church he had himself designed in 1905. His death remains unsolved to this day.
