= Fourth Partition (film) =

2013 documentary film

The Fourth Partition is a documentary film about the history of Poles in Chicago and the United States. Its focus is on the first wave of over 4,000,000 Poles who migrated from Poland between 1870 and 1920. This film was produced in 2013 by Amerykafilm LLC., (Adrian Prawica – Director and Editor, Rafał Muskała – Associate Producer, Mirek Miyo Mardosz, Andrzej Krzeptowski-Bohac, Jeton Murtishi, Sławomir Bielawiec, and Jan Zienko – music).

The world premiere was on November 8, 2013, as part of the 25th Polish Film Festival in America (Chicago), where the film received the "Discovering Eye Award". It was also awarded with "Best Documentary Debut" at the 20th Polish Film Festival in Ann Arbor (Michigan). The film won the popular award at the 3rd Annual Polish Film festival in Vancouver, Ca. (2014). Adrian Prawica was awarded the Waclaw Lednicki Humanities Award from the Polish Institute of Arts & Sciences in America (2014), and the Creative Arts Prize from the Polish American Historical Association (2015).

== Synopsis ==
At the dawn of the 20th century, Chicago was the second largest city in the United States with over 2,000,000 residents. It was also the center of Polish culture and political activism in America. With Poland partitioned between Russia, the Habsburg monarchy, and Prussia, over 4,000,000 Poles immigrated to the United States between 1870 and 1920 in search of a better life. In Chicago, they worked in some of the most dangerous factories and mills in the United States. In their neighborhoods, they built communities, churches, and most of all, aided their beloved Poland in her fight for independence. Their story is known as the "Fourth Partition".

Donald Pienkos, James Pula, and Dominic Pacyga discuss places and events from the early 20th century that had historical significance in Polish-American History. They provide a picture of struggling immigrants who didn’t speak the English language, or were aware of the reality in the "New World". They were hired in steel mills and packing houses to do some of the most difficult and often lowest paying manual labor. Historians discuss neighborhoods where Poles lived, built churches, and created their communities. Poles not only named their neighborhoods after Polish parishes (Stanislawowo, Trójcowo, Helenowo) and tried to keep their culture, but also aided Poland in its fight for independence.

The film’s creators present economic and historical reasons for the Polish migration to the United States. The film starts in 1608, at the Jamestown colony, when the first Poles arrive. From there, it talks about the first large Polish settlement in Panna Maria, Texas, and Chicago, as the center for Polish culture in America.

Historians and Polish journalists debate about social and political strengths of Polish community in Chicago, which resulted not only as an active participation in local authorities, but also in fraternal organizations. Poles also created their military structure – "Blue Army" led by General Józef Haller.

== Production ==
The film was released in 2013 by Amerykafilm, LLC., and was produced by Adrian Prawica & Rafał Muskała. Mirek Mardosz, Andrzej Krzeptowski-Bohac, Jeton Murtishi, Jan Zienko and Sławomir Bielawiec composed the original music score.

== Awards ==
- 2013 – "Discovering Eye Award" 25th Annual Polish Film Festival in America, USA
- 2013 – "Best Debut" 20th Annual Polish Film Festival in Ann Arbor Michigan, USA
- 2014 – "Popular Award" 3rd Annual Vancouver Polish Film Festival, Canada
- 2014 - "The Waclaw Lednicki Humanities Award "Polish Institute of Arts & Sciences in America
- 2015 - "Creative Arts Prize" Polish American Historical Association
