= Saint Michael the Archangel Catholic Church (Chicago) =

St. Michael's
- Saint Michael the Archangel Catholic Church
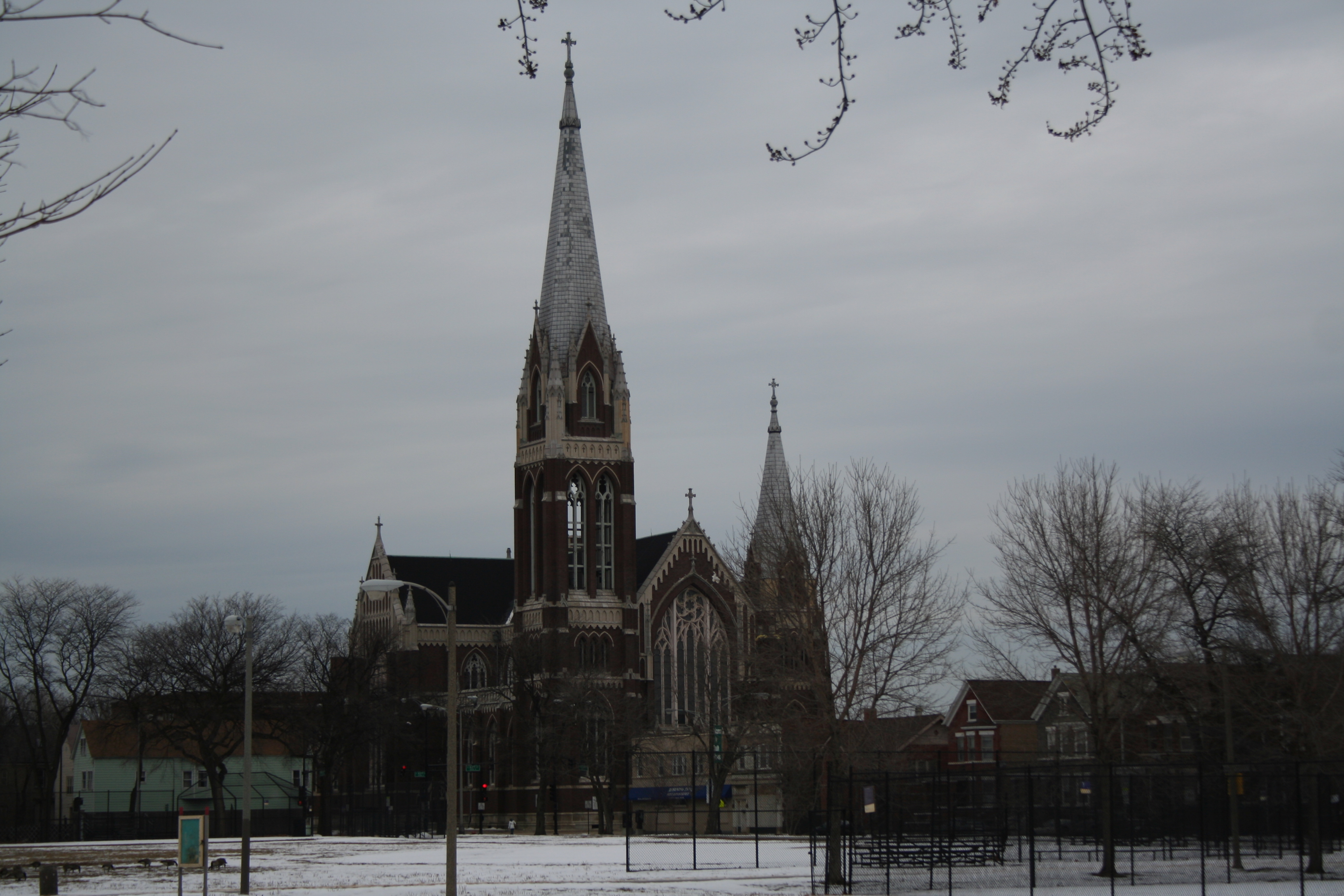
- in January 2008, from Russell Park

- Location within Chicago metropolitan area
- 41°44′42″N 87°32′51″W
- Location: Chicago, Illinois
- Country: USA
- Denomination: Roman Catholic
- Website: www.saintmichaelchicago.org

History
- Status: Parish church
- Founded: 1892
- Founder: Polish community (from Immaculate Conception parish)
- Dedication: St. Michael the Archangel
- Dedicated: May 23, 1909

Architecture
- Functional status: Closed
- Architect: William J. Brinkmann
- Architectural type: Church
- Style: Gothic or Neogothic
- Groundbreaking: 1907
- Completed: 1909
- Closed: 2021

Specifications
- Capacity: 2000

Administration
- Metropolis: Chicago
- Archdiocese: Chicago

St. Michael (Polish: Kościół Świętego Michała) is a church of the Roman Catholic Archdiocese of Chicago. The current church is located at E. 83rd Street and S. South Shore Drive in South Chicago, a neighborhood of Chicago, Illinois.

It is a prime example of the so-called "Polish Cathedral style" of churches in both its opulence and grand scale. Along with Immaculate Conception, it is one of the two monumental Polish churches dominating over the South Chicago neighborhood.

== History ==
Founded in 1892 as a Polish parish in Chicago to relieve overcrowding at Immaculate Conception.

Bishop Paul Peter Rhode, the first Polish auxiliary bishop in Chicago, served as pastor from 1897 until he was named bishop of Green Bay in 1915. The parish continued to serve Polish steel workers until the steel mills closed in the 1980s. Today the parish as well as the neighborhood are predominantly Latino.

Bishop Thomas J. Paprocki served as a priest at St. Michael's and then served as associate pastor from the time he was ordained to the priesthood by John Cardinal Cody on May 10, 1978, until 1983.

The church closed down in 2021.

== Architecture ==
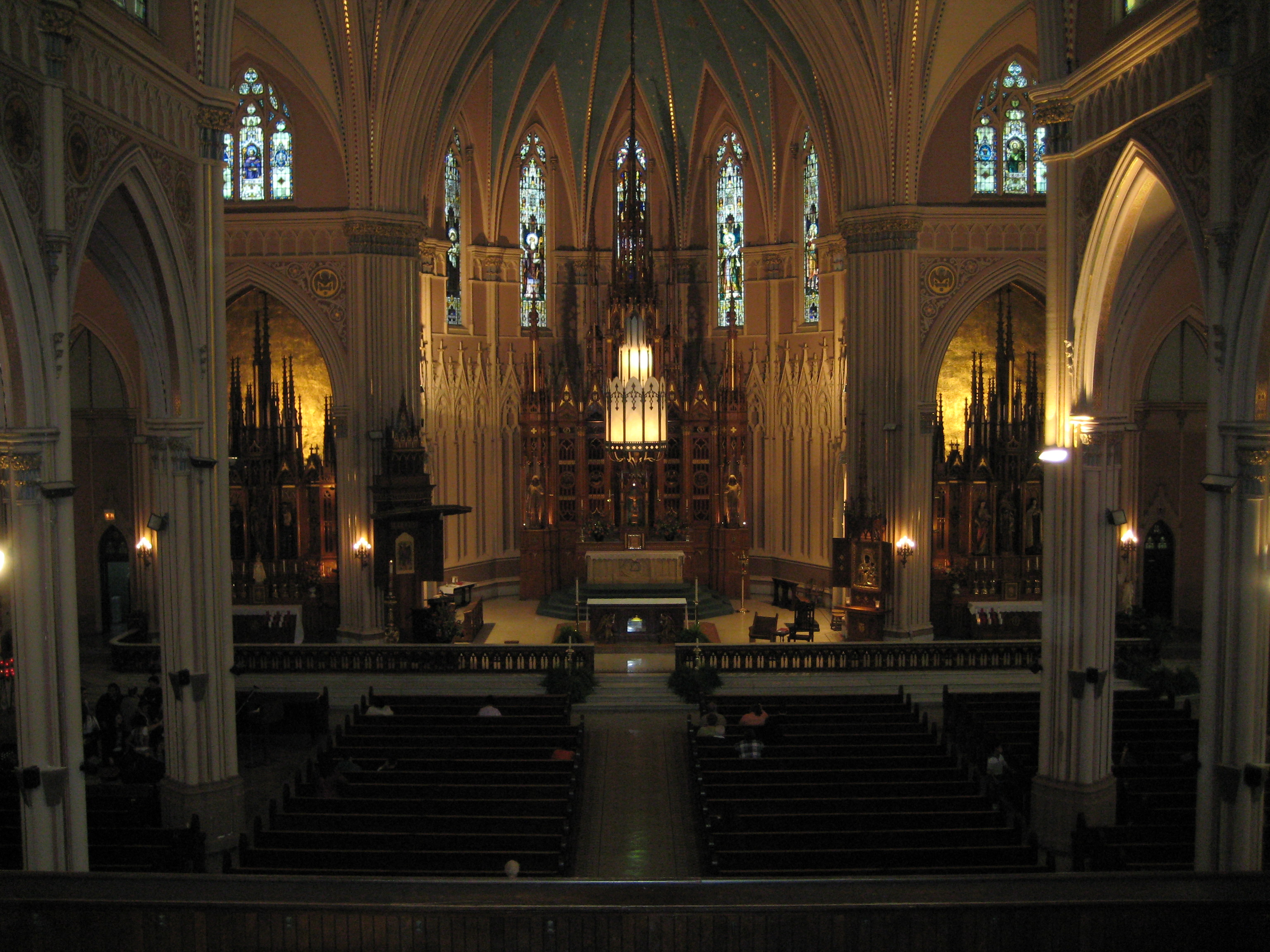
The altar at St. Michaels

The church was built between 1907 through 1909 designed by William J. Brinkmann. The Neogothic edifice is one of only three Polish churches in the Archdiocese of Chicago built in this style. The Gothic Revival façade, the choice of brick as well as the uneven steeples are an architectural homage to the Marian Basilica in Cracow. U.S. Steel donated the steel for the structure since 90% of the parishioners worked at the mills. The main altar reredos is constructed of butternut and bird's eye maple wood, as are the two side altars. The central statue of Michael the Archangel defeating Lucifer, the two incensing angels and the statues on the side altars were sculpted and painted by hand. The beautiful and rare communion rail is carved in oak with a white marble top. The interior of the church can seat approximately 2,000 people.

Interesting to music enthusiasts is the grand piano which belonged to famed composer, Ignace Jan Paderewski.

A shrine to the Black Madonna of Częstochowa, the National Patron of the people of Poland, is located in the sanctuary and was constructed in Poland in the early 1960s.

The magnificent stained glass windows were made by F. X. Zettler of Munich, Germany. Of special note are the two transept windows on the East and West sides of the church. They are the largest and according to some also the most beautiful stained glass windows in the Archdiocese of Chicago. The eastern transept window depicts the Pentecost event, while the western transept window depicts Saint Michael the Archangel at the last judgement.

== Church in architecture books ==
- Sinkevitch, Alice (2004). The AIA Guide to Chicago. Harvest Books.
- McNamara, Denis R. (2005). Heavenly City: The Architectural Tradition of Catholic Chicago. Liturgy Training Publications.
- Lane, George A. (1982). Chicago Churches and Synagogues: An Architectural Pilgrimage. Loyola Press.
- Kantowicz, Edward R. (2007). The Archdiocese of Chicago: A Journey of Faith. Booklink.

== See also ==
- Tadeusz Żukotyński, Catholic fine art painter and mural artist
- Sr. Maria Stanisia, Polish-American fine art painter and restoration artist
- Jozef Mazur, Polish-American painter and stained glass artist
- Polish Cathedral style churches of Chicago
- Polish Americans
- Poles in Chicago
- Polish Roman Catholic Union of America
- Roman Catholicism in Poland
- Saint Michael (Roman Catholic)
