= Martin A. Carr =

Irish-born American architect

Martin A. Carr was an Irish born architect, educated in England who was well known for his designs of Chicago area churches in the late 1800s and early 1900s.

An avid reader of British art and Gothic Revivalist John Ruskin, some of his designs, such as for Visitation, have a similarly sophisticated design. He also designed commercial buildings.

== Selected works ==
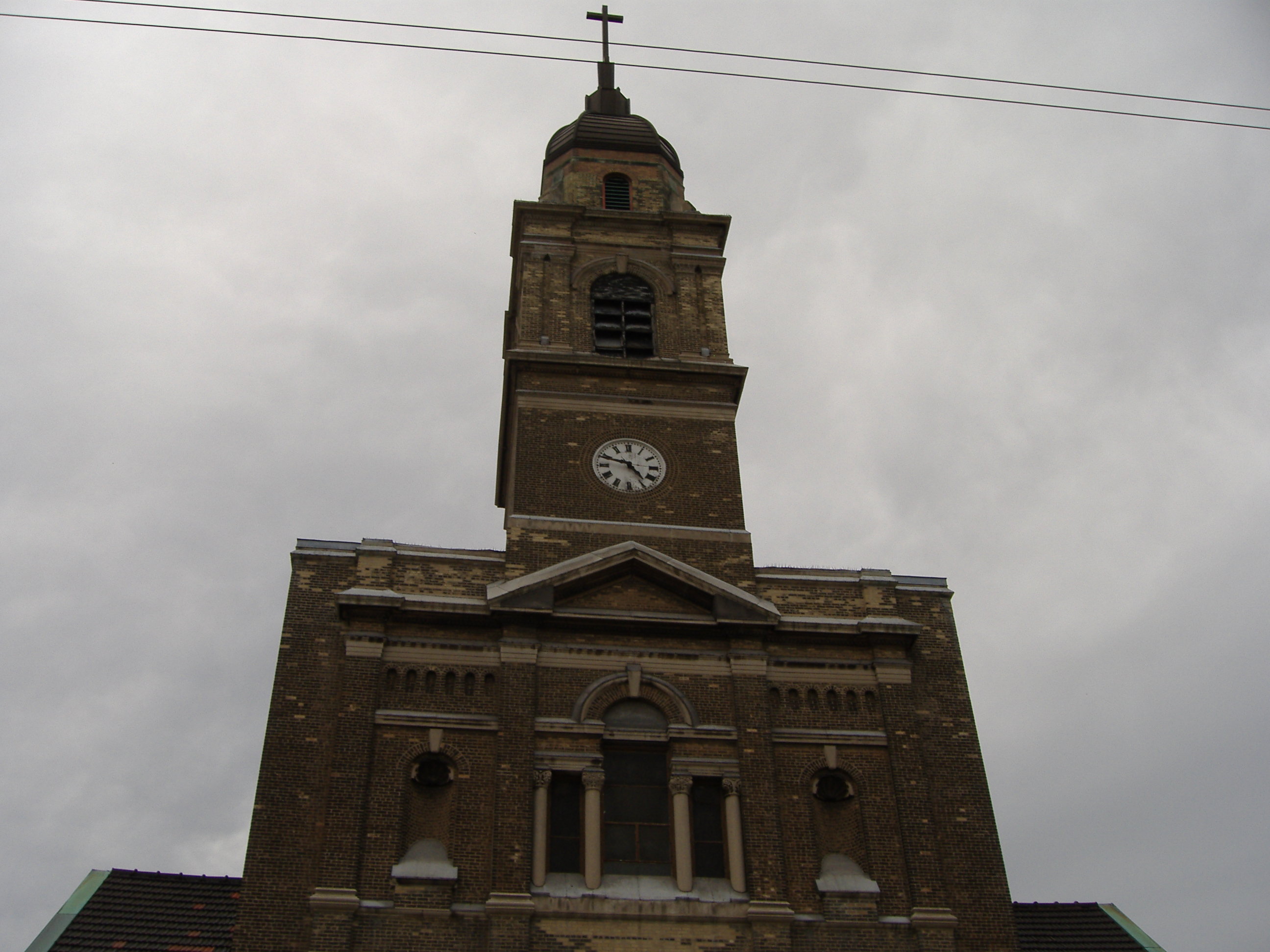
Immaculate Conception Church in Chicago

- St Patrick's Church, Lemont (1895)
- St Mary's Church, Elgin
- St. Bernard's Catholic Church, 66th Street and Stewart Avenue
- St. Charles on 12th street
- St. Michael's on Washington
- St. Basil Visitation
- Church of the Immaculate Conception, Chicago
