= Polish American Association =

- Zrzeszenie Amerykańsko Polskie
- Formation: August 1922; 104 years ago
- Tax ID no.: 36-2240816
- Location: Chicago, Illinois

The Polish American Association (PAA) (Polish: Zrzeszenie Amerykańsko Polskie) is a non-profit human services agency that serves the diverse needs of the Chicago immigrant community.

Originally located in Polish Downtown, the PAA was founded as the Polish Welfare Association in 1922 by a group of prominent Polish businessmen and professionals to provide Polish language social services in Chicago. Since then, PAA has helped generations of immigrant families adjust to life in the United States.

The organization provides bilingual and bicultural services to members of Chicago’s Polish and immigrant communities.

== Mission statement ==
Although it was founded to serve Polish immigrants, the PAA now provides services to the broader Chicago immigrant community.

== Program Description ==
PAA contributes to the vitality of Chicago's communities by serving more than 3,000 clients per month through 30 programs and services. Program areas include social services, education and employment services, immigrant services, information and advocacy.

== Social Services ==
PAA's Social Services offers assistance to families, seniors, youth, battered women, the homeless, and those seeking to free themselves of substance abuse. PAA staff provides professional support, advice and hands-on assistance in clients’ first language to create more stable home environments for immigrants.

Social services include: individual and family counseling; parenting education; crisis intervention; domestic violence program; partner abuse intervention program; senior case management; homemaker services; youth development and drug prevention program; day center for homeless men; emergency homeless outreach services and case management; intensive outpatient alcohol treatment; health outreach, food pantry; clothing closet; rent and energy assistance; and outreach and interpretation services.

== Education & Employment Services ==
PAA's Learning Center has helped thousands of Polish immigrants and others in Chicago learn English, prepare for U.S. Citizenship exams, and gain new skills to enable them to enter careers in healthcare and other professional settings and become active, contributing members of Chicago's communities. The Learning Center offers English as a Second Language and citizenship classes, literacy tutoring, an award-winning vocational training program for certified nursing assistants and physical rehabilitation aide, office skills training, computer and nursing review classes, job placement and counseling and career counseling program.

PAA has successfully provided employment services since 1981, adult education since 1989, and vocational training since 1992. PAA is approved by the Illinois State Board of Education as a Private Business and Vocational School.

== Immigrant Services ==
PAA's immigration counselors help clients complete citizenship applications, including fingerprinting, taking photographs, and translating documents, as well as provide information about current immigration policies and procedures.

== Information and Advocacy ==
In order to offer its experience and services to a wider audience than those geographically located close to the offices, PAA disseminates information about issues of concern to immigrants through its website, www.polish.org; Polish newsletter, Ogniwo; and English newsletter, The Link. By offering its resources on the Internet, PAA allows linguistically and geographically isolated Polish-speaking individuals throughout the U.S. and the world to receive up-to-date, bilingual information on issues of importance to the community. PAA staff remains in close contact with the local community through regular appearances on Polish radio, television and print media aimed at providing information and resources on relevant issues.

Through individual case advocacy, governmental and human service systems advocacy and interpretation and translation services, PAA works to address broader issues that prevent its clients from achieving social and economic self-sufficiency.

== Structure of the organization ==
The Polish American Association is an Illinois not-profit corporation qualifying for tax-exempt status under section 501(c)(3) of the Internal Revenue Code. Revenues are received in the form of contributions from individuals, businesses, and organizations; grants from foundations and corporations; contracts and grants from federal, state, and local government; and fees for certain program services. Revenues are used to fulfill the organization's chartered purpose. The voluntary board of directors is responsible for overseeing and charting the organization's operations, including its financial activities.

At PAA, the clients find comprehensive services provided by a Polish-speaking staff of more than 150 professionals, most of whom are immigrants themselves and experienced in addressing the problems caused by relocation to a new country. For linguistic, cultural and economic reasons, many members of the Polish community could not and would not be served by any other agency.

To promote the organization's work and to raise funds, PAA holds an Annual Gala in November and a Chairman's Brunch in the spring. In addition, several smaller fundraising events are planned throughout the year, including musical events and a series of fundraising luncheons.
