= Our Lady of Sorrows Basilica =

Basilica of Our Lady of Sorrows
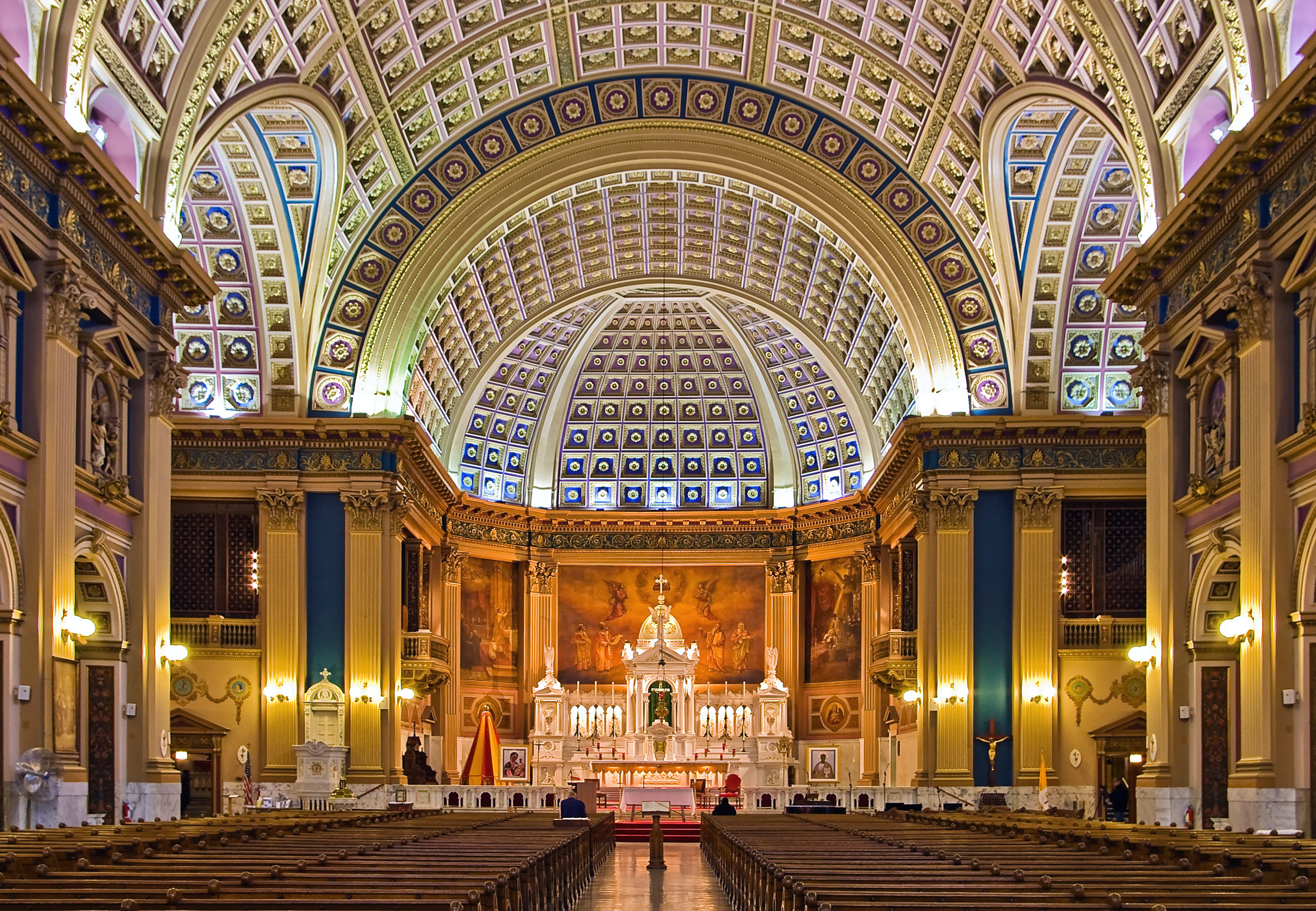
- Interior of the basilica
- Basilica of Our Lady of Sorrows
- 41°52′37″N 87°42′15″W
- Location: Chicago, Illinois
- Denomination: Catholic Church
- Religious institute: Servite Order
- Website: www.ols-chicago.org

History
- Status: Minor basilica, national shrine
- Founded: 1874
- Dedication: Our Lady of Sorrows
- Consecrated: January 5, 1902

Architecture
- Architect(s): Henry Engelbert; John F. Pope; William J. Brinkmann
- Style: Italian Renaissance Revival
- Groundbreaking: June 17, 1890

Administration
- Archdiocese: Archdiocese of Chicago

Our Lady of Sorrows Basilica is a Catholic basilica on the West Side of Chicago, Illinois, which also houses the National Shrine of Saint Peregrine. Located at 3121 West Jackson Boulevard, within the Archdiocese of Chicago, it is, along with St. Hyacinth and Queen of All Saints, one of only three churches in Illinois designated by the Pope with the title of basilica.

The church is also one of few "Black basilicas" in the United States, having a significant African-American population. Another is the Basilica of Saint Mary of the Immaculate Conception in Norfolk, Virginia.

== History ==
Founded in 1874, it has been administered by the Servite fathers for its entire history. Ground was broken for the current building on June 17, 1890, and the church was dedicated on January 5, 1902.

The Parish served an Irish and Italian congregation for many years. The sorrowful mother novena was a major devotion at the parish during the first half of the 20th century, drawing worshippers from across the country and reaching many more listeners by radio. The church also houses the National Shrine of St. Peregrine, the patron of those suffering from cancer.

In the 1960s and 1970s the parish became predominantly African-American.

The basilica was used for a brief scene in the 1987 film The Untouchables in which Sean Connery's character explains "The Chicago Way" to Kevin Costner's character. The basilica also appears in the 1989 film Next of Kin in a scene with Patrick Swayze and Helen Hunt, as well as an episode in the 2022 miniseries The Marian Stained Glass Windows.

== Architecture ==
The church was designed in an Italian Renaissance Revival architectural style by Henry Engelbert, John F. Pope, and William J. Brinkmann. It features a barrel-vaulted ceiling that wraps around a high altar made entirely of Carrara marble. It was declared a basilica by the Vatican in 1956.

== In architecture books ==
Our Lady of Sorrows Basilica is featured in a number of books on Chicago architecture, most notably "The AIA Guide to Chicago" by Alice Sinkevitch (Harvest Books 2004).

It is also in a number of books devoted to church architecture, among them:

- "Chicago Churches: A Photographic Essay" by Elizabeth Johnson (Uppercase Books Inc, 1999)
- "Heavenly City: The Architectural Tradition of Catholic Chicago" by Denis R. McNamara (Liturgy Training Publications 2005)
- "The Archdiocese of Chicago: A Journey of Faith" by Edward R. Kantowicz (Booklink 2007)
- "Chicago Churches and Synagogues: An Architectural Pilgrimage" by George A. Lane (Loyola Press 1982)
- "The Spiritual Traveler: Chicago and Illinois: A Guide to Sacred Sites and Peaceful Places" by Marylin Chiat (HiddenSpring 2004).

== Notable parishioners ==
- Isiah Thomas, NBA Hall of Famer with the Detroit Pistons

== See also ==
- Our Lady of Sorrows
