= Bessemer Park =

Park in Chicago, Illinois, United States

Coordinates: 41.7325°N 87.5570°W

Bessemer Park is a public park in Chicago, Illinois, United States. Created in 1904, it was named for Henry Bessemer, the inventor of the eponymous steelmaking process. The name is appropriate, since Chicago's most productive steel mill, the U.S. Steel South Works, was located just a mile away.

The park was created by the South Park Commission as part of a new neighborhood park system in Chicago. Living conditions for immigrants in search of the "American dream" had become intolerable because of overcrowding. Most people didn't own cars. Other parks were too far away. Park superintendent J. Frank Foster conceived a new type of parkland for population-dense areas—parks providing "breathing spaces" and a host of other amenities, from public bathing to organized recreation. The Olmsted Brothers and the architects Daniel H. Burnham and Co. were engaged to design the entire park system, including Bessemer Park.

Bessemer Park has a nature garden planted with a wide variety of native flowering trees, shrubs and forbs.
