= Flora Zygman =

Polish-American pianist (died 1940)

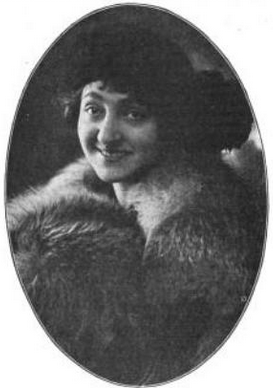
- Flora Zygman, from a 1919 publication.
- Other names: Flora Guenzburg Zygman, Flora G. Zygmanowa
- Occupation: Pianist

Flora Guenzburg Zygman (died after May 1940) was a Polish-born American pianist based in Chicago.

== Early life ==
Flora Guenzburg Zygman was from Warsaw. She studied with Sergei Bortkiewicz and with Alexander Glazunov in Saint Petersburg.

== Career ==
Zygman taught and played piano in Chicago from 1917, and was a soloist with the Temple Judea Symphony Orchestra in Chicago in 1918. In 1919 she was a soloist with the Cincinnati Symphony Orchestra. She made her New York debut in 1919, in an afternoon at the Aeolian Hall. "The young pianist played with daylight cheerfulness and feminist sensitiveness," reported one reviewer, "and with no little technical skill."

She made piano roll recordings for Ampico in 1920. She also played in trios with violinist Edmund Zygman and cellist Adolf Hoffman, and gave a concert with German contralto Rosa Olitzka on Mackinac Island in 1920.

In 1922, 1928, 1932, 1936 and 1940, she was briefly noted for being the very last alphabetical listing in each year's new edition of Who's Who in America.
