= Poles in Chicago =

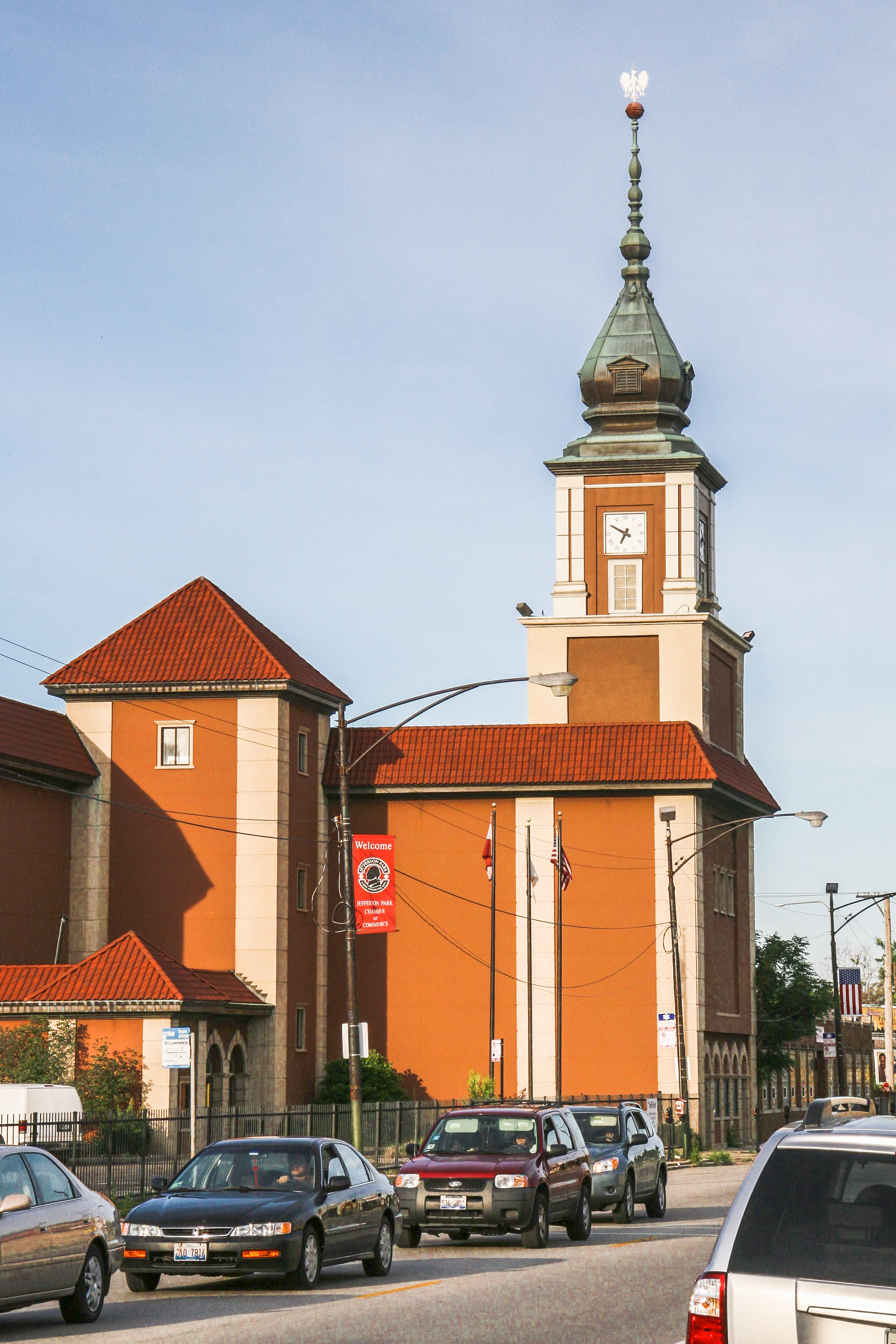
The Gateway Theatre in Jefferson Park is the seat of the Copernicus Foundation. The theater's Baroque spire is a replica of the Royal Castle in Warsaw

Both immigrant Poles and Americans of Polish heritage live in Chicago, Illinois. They are a part of worldwide Polonia, the Polish term for the Polish Diaspora outside of Poland. Poles in Chicago have contributed to the economic, social and cultural well-being of Chicago from its very beginning. Poles have been a part of the history of Chicago since 1837, when Captain Joseph Napieralski, along with other veterans of the November Uprising first set foot there. As of the 2000 U.S. census, Poles in Chicago were the largest European American ethnic group in the city, making up 7.3% of the total population. However, according to the 2006–2008 American Community Survey, German Americans and Irish Americans each had slightly surpassed Polish Americans as the largest European American ethnic groups in Chicago. German Americans made up 7.3% of the population, and numbered at 199,789; Irish Americans also made up 7.3% of the population, and numbered at 199,294. Polish Americans now made up 6.7% of Chicago's population, and numbered at 182,064. Polish is the fourth most widely spoken language in Chicago behind English, Spanish, and Mandarin.

According to Census estimates as of 2023, the Polish ancestry population in the broader Chicago metropolitan area numbers 721,538, making it the metropolitan region with the highest Polish population in the country, and likely the most Polish metropolitan area in the world outside of Poland. While it is often claimed that Chicago has or had the highest Polish population outside of Warsaw, this is unlikely to ever have been the case, given the population of Łódź and Wrocław has historically outpaced the Polish ancestry population in Chicago.

== History ==
A number of Poles contributed to the history of the city together with Captain Napieralski, a veteran of Cross Mountain during the November Uprising. Along with him came other early Polish settlers such as Major Louis Chlopicki, the nephew of General Józef Chłopicki who had been the leader of the same insurrection. Not to mention a certain A. Panakaske (Panakaski) who resided in the second ward in the 1830s as well as J. Zoliski who lived in the sixth ward with records of both men having cast their ballots for William B. Ogden in the 1837 mayoral race in Chicago.

=== Distribution ===
According to Dominic Pacyga, most of the Poles who first came to Chicago settled in five distinct parts of the city. The first of those Polish Patches, as they were colloquially referred to, was located on the Near Northwest Side. Centered on the Polish Triangle at the intersection of Milwaukee and Ashland Avenues with Division Street, it later became known as Polish Downtown. The second large settlement, developed in Pilsen on the west side near 18th street and Ashland avenue. Poles established two separate enclaves in the Stock Yard district, one in Bridgeport, the other in the Back of the Yards near 47th street and Ashland avenue. Another Polish neighborhood developed in the area around the massive Illinois Steel works in South Chicago in the area colloquially referred to as "the Bush".

=== Initial historical Polish patches ===
Polish communities in Chicago were often founded and organized around parishes by immigrants who named their neighborhoods after them, such as Jackowo and Wacławowo in the Avondale community area, named by adding the Polish toponymic suffix -owo to the Polish names of the Basilica of Saint Hyacinth and St. Wenceslaus Church, respectively.

=== Subsequent historical Polish patches ===
Later as Poles grew in number and advanced economically, they migrated further out into outlying areas. The result was that the West Town/Logan Square settlement in Polish Downtown spread westward along North Avenue and northwestward along Milwaukee, thereby creating a "Polish Corridor," which tied in contiguous areas such as Norwood Park, Jefferson Park, Portage Park, and Belmont-Cragin. The same kind of advance occurred in the other original areas of Polish settlements so that Poles from both the Lower West Side and the Back of the Yards moved into both sides of Archer Avenue, giving rise to sizable Polish settlements on the Southwest Side of the city such as McKinley Park, Garfield Ridge, Brighton Park and Archer Heights. On the far Southeast Side, the South Chicago "steel mill settlements" spilled over into Pullman, Roseland, East Side, Hegewisch and Calumet City as well as into Lake County in Northwest Indiana, where thriving Polish communities were found in North Hammond, Whiting, the Indian Harbor section of East Chicago and several neighborhoods in the newly built industrial city of Gary.

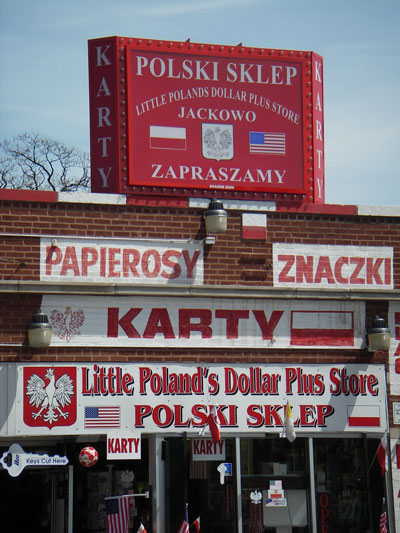
A Polish store along Milwaukee Avenue in Chicago's Polish Village.

== Religion ==
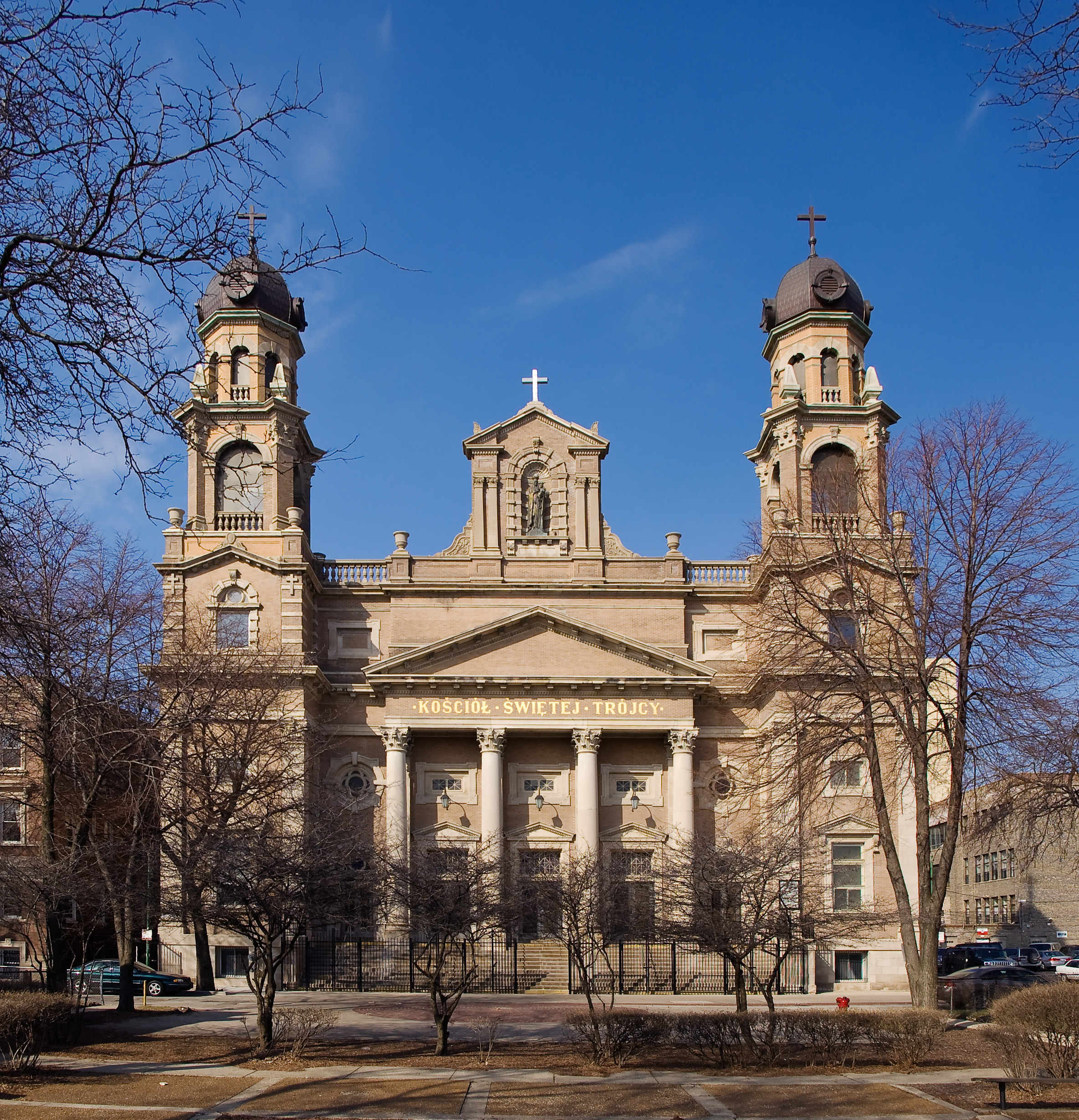
Holy Trinity Polish Mission.

As in Poland, the majority of Polish immigrants who settled in Chicago were Roman Catholics.

Chicago-area members of the Polish National Catholic Church (PNCC), an independent Old Catholic church formed by Polish immigrants to America who felt disenfranchised by the largely Irish-American and German-American leadership of the Catholic Church in the United States, are served by the PNCC's All Saints Cathedral.

Poland is also home to followers of Protestantism and the Eastern Orthodox Church. Small groups of both of these groups are present Chicago. One of the most celebrated painters of religious icons in North America today is a Polish American Eastern Orthodox priest, Fr. Theodore Jurewicz, who painted New Gračanica Monastery in Third Lake, Illinois, over the span of three years.

While large numbers of Jews from the former lands of the Polish–Lithuanian Commonwealth immigrated to the Chicago area, they faced a historical trajectory far different from that of their Christian counterparts. In the process of Americanization, many Polish Jews in Chicago would lose their identification with Poland, with notable exceptions. There have also been small numbers of Muslims, mostly Lipka Tatars originating from the Białystok region.

== The Polish presence in Chicago today ==
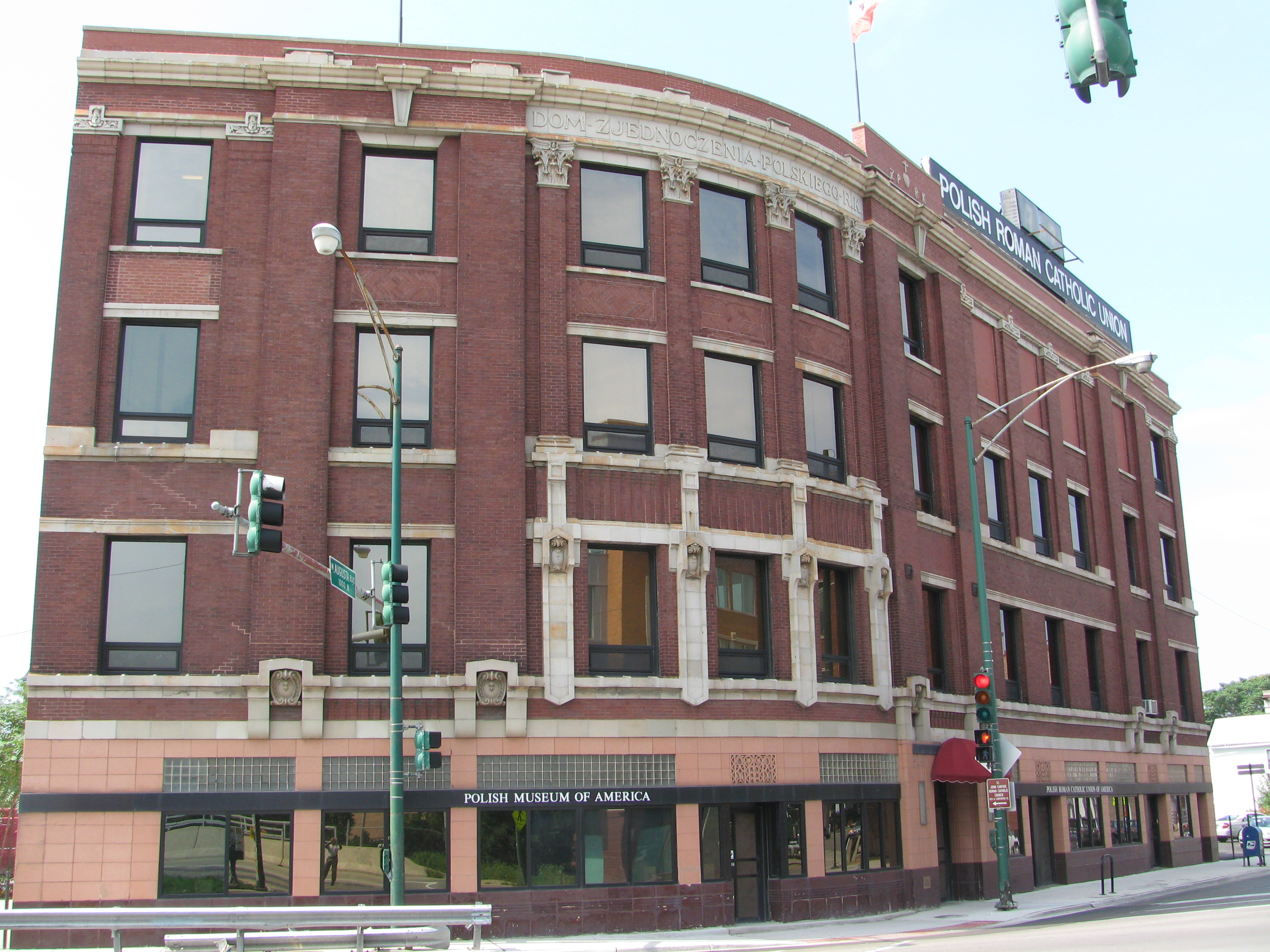
The Polish Museum of America.

=== Institutions ===
Chicago bills itself as the largest Polish city outside of Poland with approximately 800,000 people of Polish ancestry in the Chicago metropolitan area. Chicago's Polish presence is felt in the large number of Polish American organizations located there, including the Polish Museum of America, the Polish American Association, the Polish National Alliance and the Polish Highlanders Alliance of North America. A column fragment of Wawel Castle, the onetime seat of Poland's royalty, has been incorporated into Chicago's landmark Tribune Tower as a visual tribute to Chicago's large Polish populace.

=== Culture ===
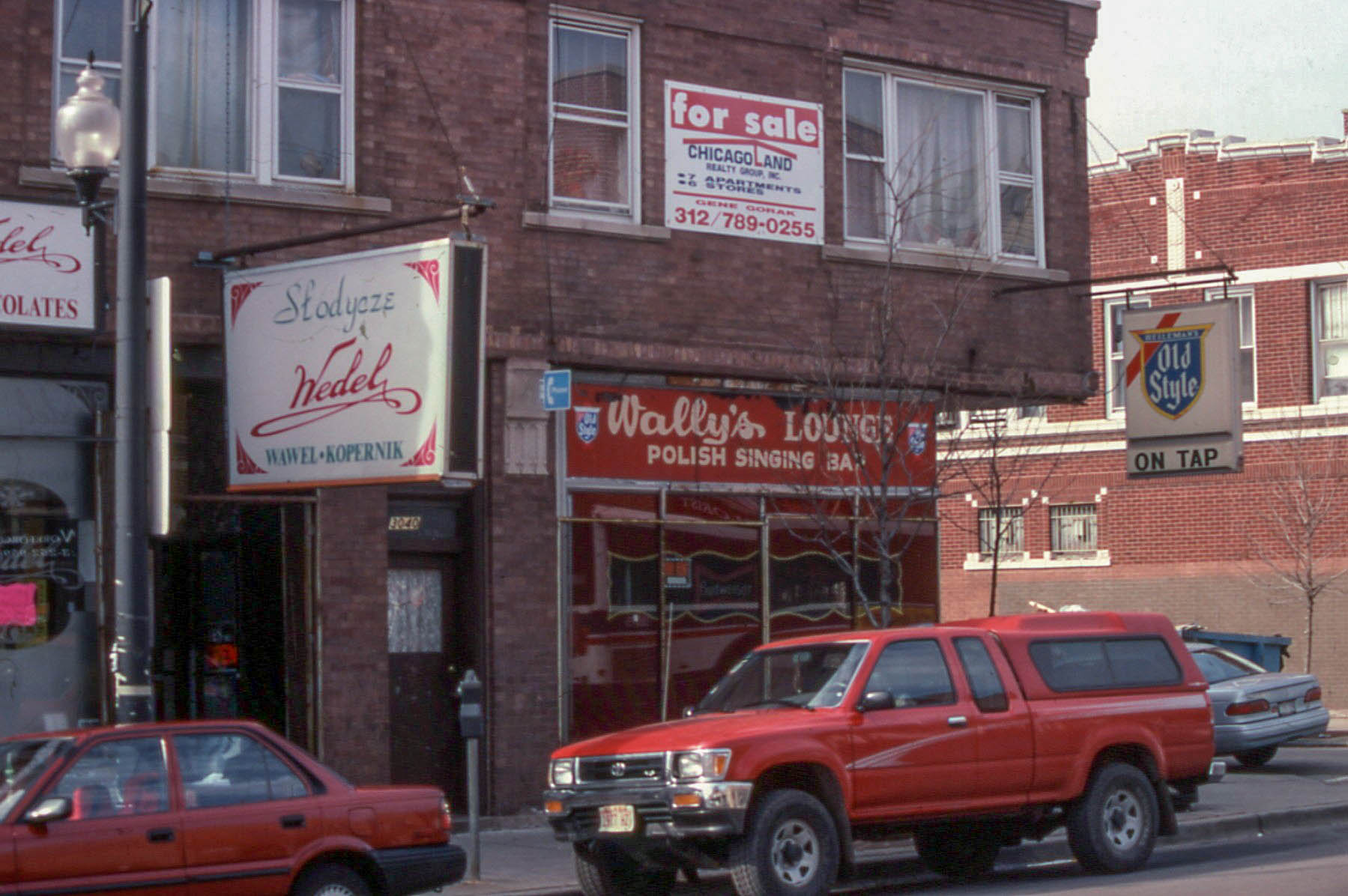
'Polish singing bar' on Milwaukee Avenue, circa 1999

Chicago also has a thriving Polish cultural scene. The Polish Arts Club of Chicago was founded in 1926. The city hosts the Polish Film Festival of America where various Polish films are screened during the weeklong festival every October. Polish stage productions in both Polish and English are regularly staged at numerous venues throughout the Chicago Metropolitan Area. The most prominent venues among these are the Chopin and Gateway Theatres. The Gateway, which is also the seat of the Polish Cultural Center in Chicago is the home of the Paderewski Symphony Orchestra. The Lira Ensemble, the only professional performing arts company outside of Poland that specializes in Polish music, song, and dance is Artist-in-Residence at Loyola University Chicago. Chicago is also host to several Polish folk dance ensembles that teach traditions to Polish-American children.

Chicago celebrates its Polish Heritage every Labor Day weekend at the Taste of Polonia Festival in Jefferson Park, attended by such political notables as President George H. W. Bush, Dick Cheney, Newt Gingrich, Hadassah Lieberman, Congresswoman Melissa Bean, and Tipper Gore. Illinois, due to the influence of this large population, is also one of the few states that celebrates Casimir Pulaski Day. Some schools and government services in the metro area are closed for the holiday.

The Almanac of American Politics 2004 states that "Even today, in Archer Heights [a neighborhood of Chicago], you can scarcely go a block without hearing someone speaking Polish". This may be anachronistic because, although once true, today the Archer Heights neighborhood is predominately Mexican-American, with many of the Polish former residents having died or moved to the suburbs. This is reflected in many of the businesses that served the Polish community having been replaced with businesses that serve the Mexican community. Polish-language business signs, once ubiquitous in Archer Heights, are now quite rare, while Spanish-language signs are seen on many businesses in the area.

In the 1972 musical Grease, the majority of characters had Polish surnames (Zuko, Dumbrowski, Kenickie); Jim Jacobs, who conceived Grease, based the musical on his real-life experiences in a Chicago high school. Much of the Polish-American nature of the musical was discarded when Grease was made into a feature film in 1978, casting non-Polish actors in the lead roles, and subsequent productions have also followed the film's lead in toning down the Chicago Polish influences.

== Notable persons ==
=== Activists ===
- Emilia Napieralska, president of the Polish Women's Alliance of America

=== Actors, singers, and directors ===
- Stanley Andrews, born Stanley Andrzejewski, an American actor who played the voice of Daddy Warbucks on the radio program Little Orphan Annie
- Carlos Bernard, born Carlos Bernard Papierski, an American actor and director, best known for his role as Tony Almeida in 24
- Casey and Nina Siemaszko – American actors
- Danny Pudi, an American actor best known for his role as Abed Nadir in Community, born in Chicago to a Polish mother and an Indian father

=== Writers and authors ===
- Stuart Dybek – writer of fiction and poetry
- John Guzlowski – author

=== Businessmen and entrepreneurs ===
- John S. Flizikowski – architect of residential, church, and commercial buildings during the late 19th and early 20th centuries
- Paul Bragiel – Silicon Valley entrepreneur & venture capitalist, Colombia national team cross country skier

=== Musicians and composers ===
- Jack Benny, born Benjamin Kubelsky, American comedian, vaudevillian, radio, television and film actor, and violinist
- Walter Jagiello - polka musician known as L'il Wally who was one of the first two inductees into the International Polka Association Polka Hall of Fame.
- Feliks Konarski – poet, songwriter, and cabaret performer
- Krzysztof Klenczon – singer and songwriter and member of the group Czerwone Gitary
- Ray Manzarek – keyboardist of The Doors
- Artur Rodziński conductor of opera and symphonic music
- Flora Zygman – pianist, music educator

=== Clergy ===
- Vincent Barzynski – Roman Catholic priest and organizer

=== Painters, sculptors, and artists ===
- Jerzy Kenar – sculptor
- Richard Nickel – architectural photographer and historical preservationist
- Ed Paschke – painter
- Mary Stanisia – American Catholic artist and painter
- John J. Szaton – sculptor
- Stanisław Szukalski – painter and sculptor
- Katarzyna Mecinski (also known as Fifty na Pol) - YouTube vlogger

=== Government officials and politicians ===
- Ben Adamowski—politician, Cook County, Illinois state's attorney, switched from Democrat to Republican and gave Richard J. Daley his closest race for mayor
- Andrzej Czuma – politician, lawyer and historian, an activist of the Polish anti-Communist opposition in the Polish People's Republic
- Peter Kiołbassa (1837–1905) Democratic politician in the City of Chicago who helped organize St. Stanislaus Kostka parish
- John Kluczynski – U.S. Representative representing Illinois's 5th congressional district
- Robert Martwick – Democratic member of the Illinois House of Representatives
- Roman Conrad Pucinski – Democratic Party Politician and U.S. Representative
- Daniel David "Dan" Rostenkowski – United States Representative and Chairman of the House Ways and Means Committee
- John Francis Smulski American politician and businessman.

=== Scholars ===
- Oskar Lange – economist and diplomat
- Marta Ptaszynska – University of Chicago professor

=== Sports ===
- Krzysztof Hausner – football right-wing forward, most notable for his performances for Cracovia Krakow
- Mike Krzyzewski – Basketball coach
- Al Piechota – Professional baseball player whose career spanned 15 seasons
- Moose Skowron - Professional baseball player, eight-time All Star

=== Criminals ===
- Ted Kaczynski – Evergreen Park math professor and terrorist
- Tillie Klimek – serial killer
- Steven Kazmierczak – Northern Illinois University shooting of February 14, 2008
- John Wayne Gacy – serial killer
- Wanda Stopa – murderer and lawyer

== See also ==
- Diaspora politics in the United States
- Felician Sisters
- Polish Cathedral style churches
- Polish Constitution Day Parade
- Polish Falcons
- Polish Roman Catholic Union of America
- Resurrectionist Congregation
- Fourth Partition, a 2013 documentary film
