= South Chicago, Chicago =

Community area in Chicago, Illinois

South Chicago
- Community area
- Community Area 46 - South Chicago
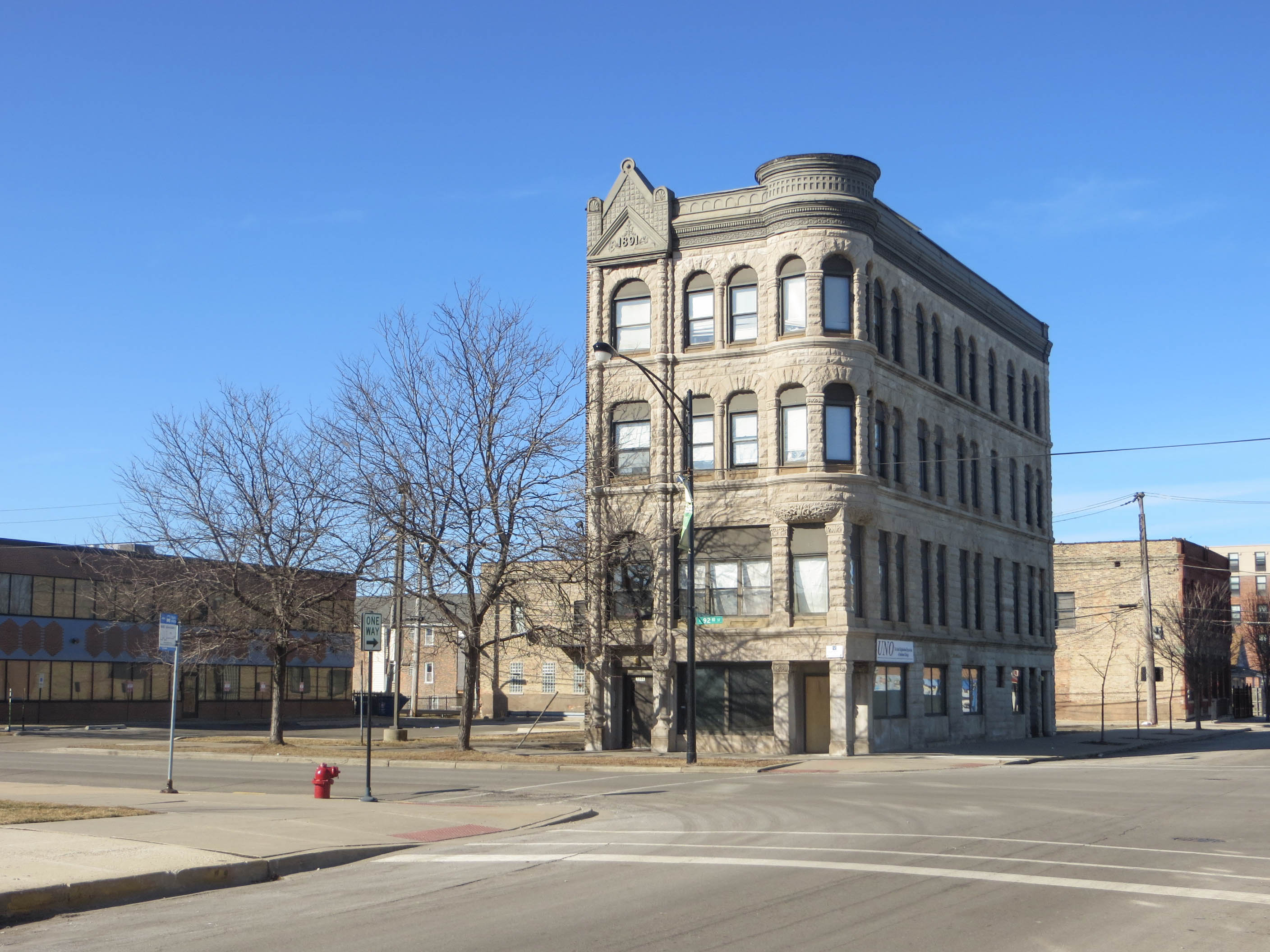
- Baltimore Avenue at 92nd Street

- Location within the city of Chicago
- Coordinates: 41°44.4′N 87°33′W
- Country: United States
- State: Illinois
- County: Cook
- City: Chicago
- Neighborhoods: list: South Shore

Area
  - Total: 3.34 sq mi (8.65 km^{2})

Population (2024)
  - Total: 27,551
  - Density: 8,250/sq mi (3,190/km^{2})

Demographics 2024
  - White: 4.6%
  - Black: 68.9%
  - Hispanic: 23.6%
  - Asian: 0.3%
  - Other: 2.5%

Educational Attainment 2024
  - High School Diploma or Higher: 81.6%
  - Bachelor's Degree or Higher: 19.7%
- Time zone: UTC-6 (CST)
  - Summer (DST): UTC-5 (CDT)
- ZIP codes: parts of 60617
- Median household income (2023): $42,456
- Source: U.S. Census, Record Information Services - see Discussion page

South Chicago, formerly known as Ainsworth, is one of the 77 community areas of Chicago in Illinois, United States.

This chevron-shaped community is one of Chicago's 16 lakefront neighborhoods near the southern rim of Lake Michigan 10 miles south of downtown. A working-class neighborhood, it is bordered by East 79th Street on the north, South Chicago Avenue (the Chicago Skyway) on the southwest, a small stretch of East 95th Street on the south. With the Calumet River on the community's southeast side, South Chicago can be considered the gateway to the Calumet Region and one of the four Chicago neighborhoods (East Side, Hegewisch and South Deering) that are considered by the locals as part of Chicago's Southeast Side. The Southeast Side is a description that the city itself continues to resist, including this neighborhood with all of Chicago's South Side communities.

== History ==
Once a separate community, South Chicago began as a series of scattered Native American settlements before becoming a village. First occupied by a chief named Askhum, considered 'lord' of the vast Callimink (Calumet) Valley and leader of the Pottawatomie people. They and other Native peoples used South Chicago and the shallow Calumet River area as portages, for seasonal settlements, hunting and fishing thousands of years before White settlers arrived to the "New World".

The post-Civil War era brought with it great industrial innovation. Developer James H. Bowen, the "Father of South Chicago," and others in a massive land grab wrested the land from its former existence and founded "Ainsworth" among other communities. This community was formed out of wetland prairie to provide residence for the labor force of European immigrants coming to work at the industries developing along the Calumet River, most notably the North Chicago Rolling Mill Company, built at the mouth of the river in 1881. Only fractions of the original topography and habitat remain as is the case with most of urban Chicago. With the entire Chicago Lakefront built on miles of landfill and slag there still remains a small stretch of semi-secluded beachfront just north of the Southworks Site. This bit of lakefront, once a seasonal settlement for the Pottawatomie, was left alone due to an unmovable and deeply embedded bedrock of granite, which defied the development techniques of the time. It is the only natural beach frontage left and virtually unknown on the entire Chicago coastline. This beachfront and the massive outcrop of the Southworks table slag to the south and the water treatment plant to the north is a perfect demonstration of the vigorous advancement of the steel industry and 20th-century development.

The four communities of Ainsworth; the Bush, Millgate Cheltenham/South Chicago and Calumet quickly developed into one village referred to collectively as South Chicago during the wave of annexation in 1883. The predominantly woodframed architecture of the Bush, Millgate and eastern Cheltenham are a lesson in Victoriana with the 'sunken yards' and bridge-like walk ups from street like Houston, Baltimore and Brandon attesting to the degree infrastructure built up from the original topography of that time. It also demonstrates how South Chicago was not immediately affected by the housing ordinances restricting the use of lumber for home building after The Great Fire of 1871. Most of the neighborhood north of East 83rd Street and west of South Manistee Avenue was developed after WWII and contain mostly brick homes, but under the ordinance brick homes began being built throughout the newly annexed neighborhood after 1883.

South Chicago was bustling with waves of immigrants as the popularity of the World's Columbian Exposition of 1893. The steel mill became U.S. Steel South Works in 1901, continuing to attract immigrants from Ireland, Eastern Europe, Scandinavia and Italy. During the 1950s many residents called the northeast section of South Chicago *"The Bush" and worked in the local massive steel mill, US Steel. Others worked in neighboring steel mills such as Youngstown Steel, Republic Steel, Bethlehem Steel, and LaSalle Steel. At its zenith, South Chicago helped make the Chicago metropolitan area the leading producer of steel products in the nation. The Willis (Sears) Tower and the Hancock Building were built from South Chicago steel. The embers, (graphite) from the smokestacks would cause the cars and sidewalks to sparkle and created a golden glow throughout the night. Softball and bowling were popular pastimes. Large Polish weddings on Saturdays were also a common sight.

Throughout the early 1910s, Mexicans from a variety of regions within Mexico began to settle in communities throughout Chicago including South Chicago. South Chicago became one of the first growing Mexican communities in Chicago. The community faced many challenges including many racist attacks by the more assimilated groups. The early Mexican community began to band together and worked to help build Our Lady of Guadalupe Church as they were not welcomed in other churches throughout the area. South Chicago's Mexican Patriotic Club's Mexican Independence Day (Sept. 16th) Parade was the first such parade in Chicago also celebrated with a carnival of rides and booths.

Historical population
Census	Pop.	Note	%±
1930	56,683		—
1940	55,090		−2.8%
1950	55,715		1.1%
1960	49,913		−10.4%
1970	45,655		−8.5%
1980	46,422		1.7%
1990	40,465		−12.8%
2000	38,596		−4.6%
2010	31,198		−19.2%
2020	27,300		−12.5%

== Current life ==
While South Chicago has a sizable African American population, existing ethnic groups continue to have strong community ties in the area. Our Lady of Guadalupe is the oldest parish founded by Mexicans in the City of Chicago. Immaculate Conception, St. Michael's, two churches built in the 'Polish Cathedral style' and later Saint Bronislava have served South Chicago's Polish residents for over 80 years and now have significant sized Latino populations as well. The first Catholic parish established in South Chicago was St. Patrick, which was founded by Irish Catholics.

Much of the business and shopping is done along Commercial Avenue. Several privately owned businesses such as clothing stores, furniture and retail, and beauty salons, can be found along Commercial Avenue. Restaurants from Nigerian to Italian cuisine are found in South Chicago. Despite the slow economy, more "Mom and Pop" stores flourish throughout South Chicago's residential areas, than in any other neighborhood. East 83rd Street, East 87th Street and south along Commercial Avenue to East 95th Street have attracted corporations, businesses and new banks into the community. Commercial Avenue is also home to many non-profit organizations including Healthy South Chicago, the Alianza Leadership Institute, Centro Comunitario Juan Diego, El Valor, Centro de Trabajadores Unidos, and SEDCOM.

The violent crime rate is 401% higher than the national average, according to the latest data from 2020.

== Parks and infrastructure ==
Wedged between East 89th Street, South Muskegon Avenue and the sycamore tree-lined South Chicago Avenue is the historic triangular Bessemer Park, named after English inventor Henry Bessemer, whose iron ore refining process revolutionized steel production. The park was designed by the Olmsted Brothers of the renowned landscape architect Frederick Law Olmsted of New York City's Central Park, as well as Chicago landmarks Washington Park and Jackson Park, built for the World's Columbian Exposition of 1891. Their work on the park started in early 1904 and finished late in 1905. The fieldhouse, only modestly upgraded, retains much of its original charm. The Bessemer Park Nature and Wildlife Garden is among Chicago's 23 noted natural "preserves" of native fauna and wildlife habitat. Bessemer Park and Russell Square Park on the corner of Bond Avenue and East 83rd Street (*the Bush), are among their last commissions, Bessemer Park is one of the largest parks on the South Side. Eckersall Playground Park and Stadium is centrally located in South Chicago at the corner of East 83rd Street and South Yates Avenue. Other new greenspaces are planned throughout the community including what is currently called "Park No. 503" at 8900 South Green Bay Avenue in the Millgate community. Designated bicycle paths from East 83rd Street, South Shore Drive/Mackinaw Avenue and South Chicago Avenue connect directly to the Burnham Greenway Trail which links to a comprehensive system of greenways throughout the Calumet Region.

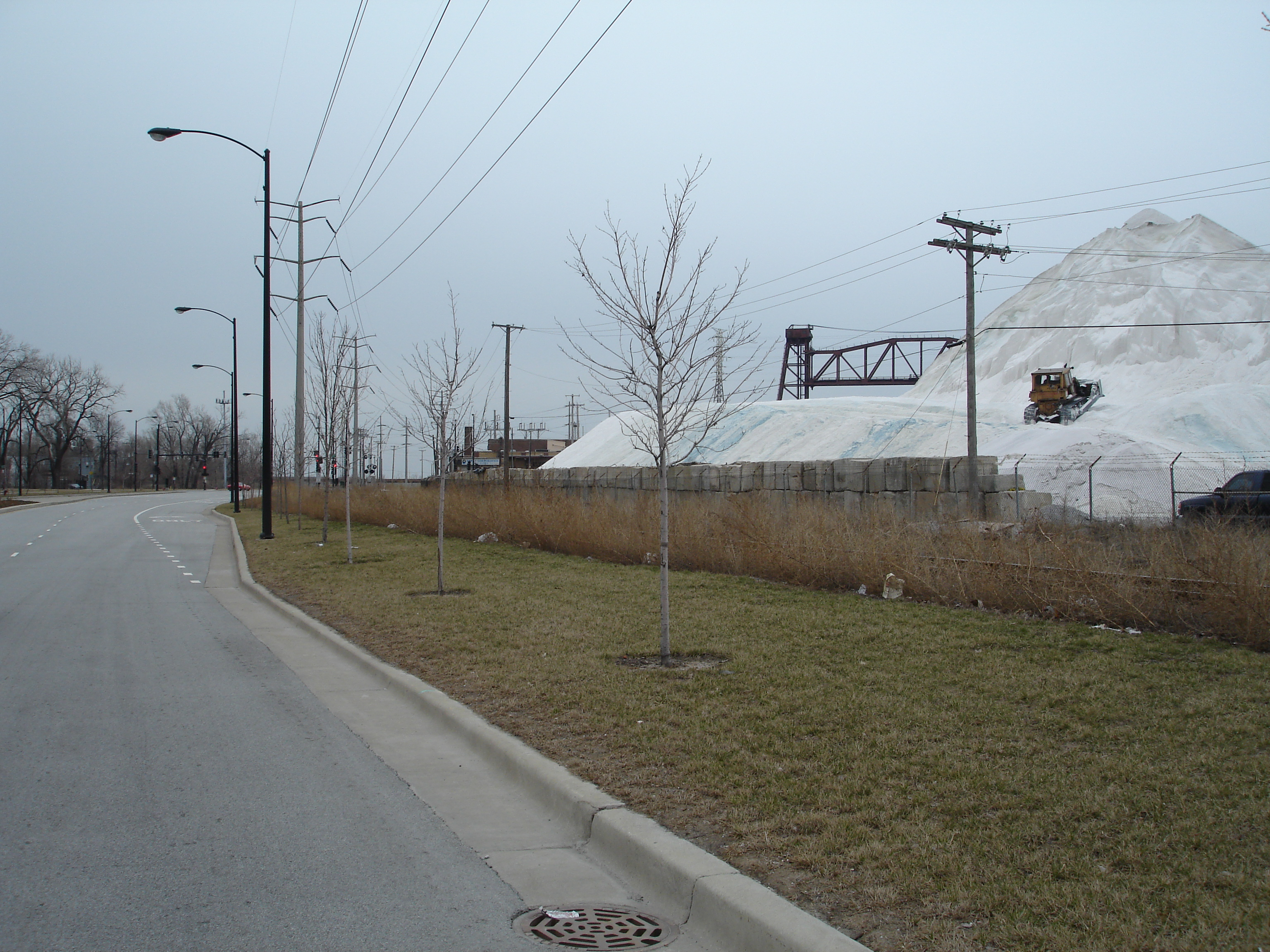
salt pile between South Harbor Avenue and the Calumet River

Since the de-industrialization of South Chicago's once inaccessible shoreline from the late 1970s on, East 87th Street has been extended to Lake Michigan, with the look and feel of a landscaped boulevard. The former Southworks site brownfield is a cleared and remediated table of slag and concrete larger than the Loop. It is currently being transformed into a lakefront park, designed to look like prairie land. This purchase of the property from developers has put South Chicago at the center of the city's and nation's lakefront redevelopment effort, one of the largest in the 21st century. Mixed residential, retail and lake recreation are planned. The new lakefront park, as yet nameless and nearing completion, was the missing link effectively closing the century-old gap between Chicago's world-class chain of parks between South Shore's Rainbow Beach Park in South Shore and Calumet Park in East Side neighborhoods. This fulfilled the dreams of noted Chicago planner and architect, Daniel Burnham and business mogul and philanthropist Montgomery Ward (both of the Gilded Age), for a free and clear lakefront. Famed architect Frank Lloyd Wright had also once designed a comprehensive plan for the shoreline before it became hyper-industrialized.

== Transportation ==
Until 1971, long-distance passenger trains stopped at the Baltimore and Ohio Railroad's South Chicago Station (19 miles from Grand Central Station). Trains included the Chesapeake and Ohio's trains to Grand Rapids, Michigan, and in earlier years, the Resort Special to Bay View. B&O trains included the Capitol Limited and the Washington–Chicago Express. The last B&O trains stopped serving the station between 1968 and 1970.

South Chicago is not connected to the Chicago "L" rapid transit system. The nearest Red Line station is located 3 miles west, at 95th Street & the Dan Ryan Expressway. The Green Line is 5 miles north, at 63rd Street and Cottage Grove Avenue. The South Chicago neighborhood does, however, contain 4 recently rebuilt Metra Electric District, South Chicago Branch stations: 79th Street/Cheltenham station, 83rd Street/South Chicago station, 87th Street/South Chicago station, and the branch's terminus at 93rd Street/South Chicago station, which is in the heart of the neighborhood's business district along South Baltimore Avenue, and is the community's most accessible commuter rail service to downtown Chicago. Although Metra is mainly a suburban service, the outbound South Chicago branch, which terminates within Chicago's city limits, is the only Metra line to do so. The Chicago Skyway borders South Chicago Avenue, running northwest towards the Dan Ryan Expressway and southeast towards Hammond, Indiana. It can be entered nearby only towards Indiana, but has one westbound entrance, to the southeast at Indianapolis Boulevard & Avenue B.

South Chicago is also served by a number of Chicago Transit Authority bus routes, services which enable commuters to make relatively easy connections to downtown and other Chicago neighborhoods. The buses that serve South Chicago are:

- N5 South Shore Night Bus
- 6 Jackson Park Express
- J14 Jeffery Jump
- 15 Jeffery Local
- 26 South Shore Express
- 30 South Chicago
- 71 71st St./South Shore
- 79 79th Street
- N79 79th Street Owl
- 87 87th Street
- 95 95th Street

== Future ==
As part of an effort to stimulate sustainable and equitable economic development in the South Chicago neighborhood, the City of Chicago is sponsoring its redevelopment. The effort represents one of the largest sustainable neighborhood revitalization developments in the country and should serve as a guide to the city for sustainable redevelopment on the south side for the next 25 years.

Chicago's plan is to be rated by the United States Green Building Council and is part of the council's LEED (Leadership in Energy and Environmental Design) for Neighborhood Development pilot program.

=== US Steel South Works Site redevelopment ===
A thirty-year development plan estimated to cost $4 billion was approved by the city in September 2010, for the former site of the huge steel mill, which operated along the neighborhood's shoreline from 1880 to 1992. The site has undergone extensive demolition and environmental remediation since 1992. The plan called for extension of Lake Shore Drive, with site construction and was to begin in 2012.

== Politics ==
South Chicago is a stronghold for the Democratic Party. In the 2016 presidential election, South Chicago cast 9,908 votes for Hillary Clinton and cast 258 votes Donald Trump. It was Clinton's 22nd largest margin of victory by percentage points in the 76 community areas she won. In the 2012 presidential election, South Chicago cast 12,147 votes for Barack Obama and 207 votes for Mitt Romney. It was Obama's 22nd largest margin of victory by percentage points in the 76 community areas he won.

At the local level, South Chicago is located in Chicago's 7th and 10th wards represented by Democrats Gregory Mitchell and Susie Sadlowski Garza respectively.

== Education ==
Chicago Public Schools operates public schools.

The Roman Catholic Archdiocese of Chicago operates Catholic Schools. St. Michael the Archangel School in South Chicago closed in 2018, when it had 80 students.

== Notable people ==
- Candy Dawson Boyd, activist and author. She was raised in South Chicago.
- Andrew Davis, film director, producer, writer, and cinematographer (Code of Silence, Above the Law, Under Siege, The Fugitive)
- Nathan Davis, film and television actor. He is the father of Andrew Davis and Richard Peter Davis.
- Richie Davis, guitarist and member of the Chicago Catz. He is the son of Nathan Davis and the brother of Andrew Davis.
- Eli Grba, pitcher for the New York Yankees and Los Angeles Angels (1959–1963). He was raised in South Chicago.
- Joni James, MGM Records star who sold more than 100 million singles and albums worldwide. She was raised in South Chicago.
- Samuel C. Maragos, politician. While a South Chicago resident, Maragos represented the Southeast side of Chicago in the Illinois General Assembly from 1968 to 1980.
- Ed "Chicago Ed" Schwartz, radio host who worked at WIND, WGN, and WLUP in Chicago. He was raised in South Chicago.
- Donne Trotter, former member of the Illinois Senate.
- Kanye West, rapper/producer born in 1977. He is responsible for albums such as Graduation.

== See also ==
- Polish American
- Polish Cathedral style
