= Huntington Bank Pavilion =

Open-air theatre in Chicago, Illinois, United States

The Pavilion at Northerly Island
- The Pavilion at Northerly Island; The Venue with a View
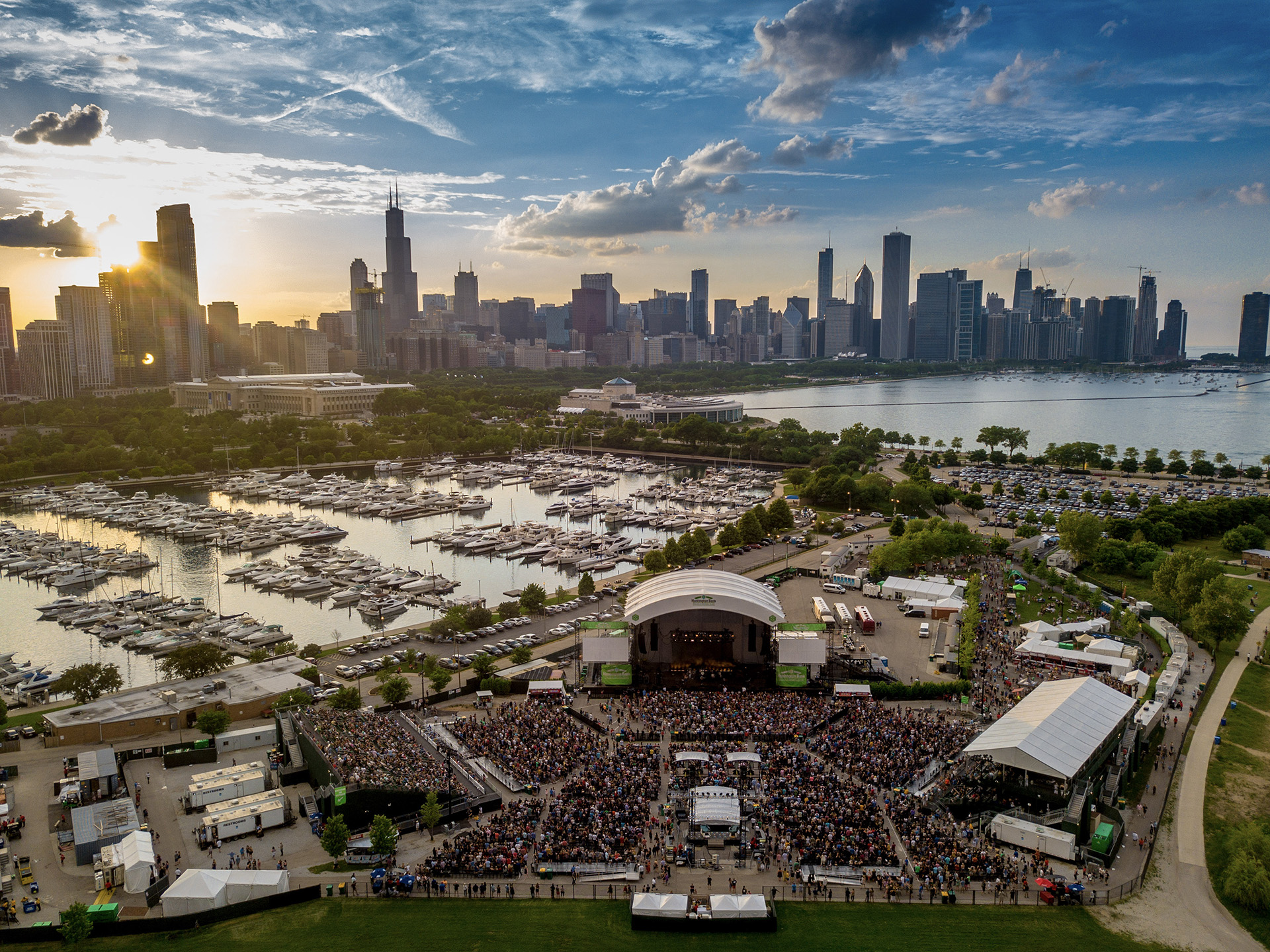
- Overhead shot of the venue and surrounding Museum Campus
- Interactive map of The Pavilion at Northerly Island
- Former names: Lakefront Pavilion (planning/construction); Charter One Pavilion (2005–13); FirstMerit Bank Pavilion (2013–17); Huntington Bank Pavilion (2017-2026)
- Address: 1300 S Lynn White Dr; Chicago, Illinois 60605; Chicago; United States
- Location: Northerly Island
- Coordinates: 41°51′48″N 87°36′31″W
- Owner: Chicago Park District
- Operator: Live Nation
- Seating type: Reserved, Lawn
- Capacity: up to 30,000 (current); 8,166 (2005–12)
- Type: Outdoor amphitheater
- Public transit: Red Orange Green at Roosevelt

Construction
- Groundbreaking: December 2004
- Opened: June 24, 2005
- Expanded: June 2013
- Cost: $1.7 million (initial construction) $3 million (2013 expansion)

Website
- www.thepavilionatnortherlyisland.com

The Pavilion at Northerly Island is an outdoor amphitheater located on Northerly Island in Chicago, Illinois. The venue is a temporary structure, with the summer concert season running from May or June until September or October. The amphitheater, which opened in June 2005, was known as Charter One Pavilion before changing its name to FirstMerit Bank Pavilion in 2013; and again to Huntington Bank Pavilion in 2017, it took on its current name in 2026.

Known as the "Venue with a View", the amphitheater has views of Lake Michigan, Burnham Harbor, Soldier Field, and the Chicago skyline.

== History ==
The venue lies on the former site of Meigs Field. On March 30, 2003, Mayor Richard M. Daley ordered a midnight demolition of the airfield. The construction crew excavated six large X's on the runway. Daley stated the continued operation of the airfield was a threat to Chicago's cityscape, using the events of 9/11 as a reference. The airfield was set to continue operation until 2011, when it would be turned over to the city of Chicago. No one within state or city government were consulted on the demolition besides Daley. The Federal Aviation Administration fined the city $33,000, with an additional one million paid in grants.

In August 2003, construction crews were sent in to continue demolition of the airfield. Originally, the space was planned to become an aviation museum. Daley refuted the plan and proposed the space become a lakefront park and nature reserve. Within the allocated 91 acres, Northerly Island was born. Over four acres were set aside for the forthcoming music venue.

With the new advent of the nature reserve to replace Meigs Field, the Chicago Park District proposed an outdoor music venue, similar to the Ravinia Pavilion. Construction began in December 2004. Since the venue would be located on the nature reserve, the structure would be erected in June and disassembled in September of each year. The venue was designed by Mark Dewalt of Valerio Dewalt Train Associates; costing $1.7 million to construct. The amphitheater features a 56' × 40' stage with 15' × 20' video screens on either side of the stage. It features three grandstands (totaling 3,666 seats) and a general admission area (totaling 4,500 seats). The Chicago Park District receives roughly $250,000 from the venue (through sponsorship deals) and $1 from every ticket sold during concert season. The venue opened June 24, 2005, with a concert by American band Earth, Wind & Fire.

=== 2013 expansion ===
Entrance of venue, 2007

The Chicago Park District originally sought expansion in 2010, wanting to increase capacity to 14,000 and attract mainstream acts to the venue. The city voted against the expansion in 2011. In March 2013, the Chicago Plan Commission approved a $3 million plan to expand the venue's capacity from 8,000 to 30,000 seats. This would mean rotating the stage to feature a lawn seating area, increasing the overall space of the venue from 4.78 to 6.9 acres. Additionally, two 300-seat grandstands were added, while the lawn arena can accommodate 22,000. There's a 12-foot slope from the front of stage to the rear of lawn, providing the proper elevation change so that the lawn can be used as a park area when not in use by the pavilion. The expansion also includes shuttle buses from the neighboring Soldier Field to help concert attendees with parking. The main entrance was widened to accommodate the capacity expansion. Delay systems for sound were added to the stage and lawn area. The original video screens were replaced by two 14' × 27' LED screens and two 11' × 17' LED screens in the lawn area.

The newly renovated venue was expected to open June 27, 2013. However, due to heavy rainfall the opening was postponed. Concerts by Dispatch and O.A.R. were relocated to the UIC Pavilion. It was opened on June 29, 2013, by Jimmy Buffett and the Coral Reefer Band.

After the COVID-19 pandemic, the venue implemented a new bag policy at their events. To reduce staff contact with guest belongings, they allow clear plastic, vinyl or PVC tote bags no larger than 12" x 6" x 12" and/or small clutch bags (4.5"x 6.5"). No other bags of any type will be allowed.

== Naming ==
Upon original conception, the venue was known as the Lakefront Pavilion. On June 22, 2005, it was announced Charter One Financial purchased naming rights for five years, for $2.5 million. From 2005 until 2013, the venue was known as the Charter One Pavilion at Northerly Island. With new construction underway, it was revealed the venue was seeking a new sponsorship deal. In June 2013, Ohio-based FirstMerit Corporation purchased a multi-year naming rights agreement. The length of the contract and amount were not disclosed. From June 27, 2013, until January 8, 2017, the venue was known as the FirstMerit Bank Pavilion. Huntington Bank acquired FirstMerit Bank near the end of 2016. On January 9, 2017, the venue name was changed to reflect this. The venue is now known as The Pavilion at Northerly Island.

- Lakefront Pavilion (planning/construction)
- Charter One Pavilion at Northerly Island (June 24, 2005 – June 26, 2013)
- FirstMerit Bank Pavilion at Northerly Island (June 27, 2013 – January 8, 2017)
- Huntington Bank Pavilion at Northerly Island (January 9, 2017 – October 2026)
- The Pavilion at Northerly Island (October 2026 - Present)

== Performances ==
=== 2024 ===
- Bryson Tiller - May 24, 2024
- NEEDTOBREATHE - May 28, 2024
- Ronny Barksdale Jr - May 31, 2024
- Beyond Wonderland - June 1, 2024
- Beyond Wonderland - June 2, 2024
- Sarah McLachlan - June 11, 2024
- Pixies & Modest Mouse - June 19, 2024
- Third Eye Blind + Yellowcard - June 28, 2024
- Caifanes - June 29, 2024
- Mother Mother - July 13, 2024
- A Day To Remember - July 25, 2024
- Vampire Weekend - July 26, 2024
- Vampire Weekend - July 27, 2024
- Tedeschi Trucks Band - July 31, 2024
- Bush - August 7, 2024
- Thirty Seconds To Mars - August 10, 2024
- Omar Apollo - August 23, 2024
- Glass Animals - August 28, 2024
- Glass Animals - August 29, 2024
- King Gizzard and the Lizard Wizard (3 Hour Marathon Set) - September 1, 2024
- Wallows - September 2, 2024
- Avril Lavigne - September 10, 2024
- Stone Temple Pilots + Live - September 11, 2024
- Falling In Reverse - September 17, 2024
- KAYTRANADA - September 20, 2024
- Kygo - September 25, 2024
- Kygo - September 26, 2024
- Kings Of Leon - September 28, 2024
- Anderson .Paak - October 4, 2024
- John Summit + Friends - October 10, 2024
- John Summit + Friends - October 11, 2024
- John Summit + Friends - October 12, 2024

=== 2023 ===
- Yeah Yeah Yeahs - June 1, 2023
- Two Friends present Big Bootie Land - June 2, 2023
- Barenaked Ladies - June 6, 2023
- Dermot Kennedy - June 7, 2023
- Heatwave Music Festival - June 10, 2023
- Heatwave Music Festival - June 11, 2023
- Louis Tomlinson - June 15, 2023
- Quinn XCII - June 16, 2023
- Billy Strings - June 17, 2023
- Young The Giant + Milky Chance - June 23, 2023
- Garbage + Noel Gallagher's High Flying Birds - June 27, 2023
- Dave Matthews Band - July 7, 2023
- Dave Matthews Band - July 8, 2023
- Yellowcard - July 16, 2023
- Sad Summer Festival - July 21, 2023
- Slightly Stoopid - July 28, 2023
- Q101 Piqniq Festival - July 30, 2023
- Ghost - August 15, 2023
- Goo Goo Dolls + O.A.R. - August 22, 2023
- 5 Seconds Of Summer - August 23, 2023
- Dominic Fike - August 24, 2023
- Beck + Phoenix - August 31, 2023
- Duran Duran - September 1, 2023
- Hozier - September 12, 2024

=== 2022 ===
- Deftones - May 27, 2022
- Rufus Du Sol - June 1, 2022
- Haim - June 3, 2022
- Phoebe Bridgers - June 4, 2022
- Rex Orange County - June 24, 2022
- Jack Johnson - June 30, 2022
- My Morning Jacket - July 2, 2022
- Big Time Rush - July 7, 2022
- Third Eye Blind - July 8, 2022
- Norah Jones - July 15, 2022
- 5 Seconds of Summer - July 16, 2022
- David Gray - July 18, 2022
- Burna Boy - July 23, 2022
- $uicideboy$ - August 2, 2022
- Goo Goo Dolls - August 4, 2022
- Brandi Carlile - August 6, 2022
- Lany - August 7, 2022
- Maren Morris - August 10, 2022
- Alicia Keys - August 23, 2022
- Florence + The Machine - September 7, 2022
- Odesza - September 9, 2022
- Odesza - September 10, 2022
- Conan Gray - September 28, 2022
- New Order & Pet Shop Boys - September 30, 2022
- The Head and the Heart - October 1, 2022

=== 2021 ===
- Dave Matthews Band - August 6, 2021
- Dave Matthews Band - August 7, 2021
- Lindsey Stirling - August 20, 2021
- Rise Against - August 28, 2021
- Greta Van Fleet - September 3, 2021
- 311 - September 10, 2021
- Quinn XCII - September 11, 2021
- Above & Beyond - September 18, 2021
- Alice Cooper - September 24, 2021

=== 2020 ===
All performances canceled due to Covid-19

=== 2019 ===
- Florence + The Machine - May 23, 2019
- Anderson .Paak - June 4, 2019
- Nickelodeon Slime Fest - June 8, 2019
- Nickelodeon Slime Fest - June 9, 2019
- Coheed and Cambria & Mastodon - June 14, 2019
- Jason Isbell and the 400 Unit with Father John Misty - June 15, 2019
- Vampire Weekend: Father of the Bride Tour - June 16, 2019
- Country LakeShake - June 21, 2019
- Country LakeShake - June 22, 2019
- Country LakeShake - June 23, 2019
- Third Eye Blind & Jimmy Eat World - June 27, 2019
- The National - June 28, 2019
- Brandi Carlile - June 29, 2019
- Sublime with Rome - July 5, 2019
- Joe Russo's Almost Dead - July 11, 2019
- V103 Summer Block Party - July 13, 2019
- Slightly Stoopid - July 21, 2019
- Jon Bellion - July 27, 2019
- Peter Frampton - July 28, 2019
- Beck & Cage The Elephant with Spoon - July 31, 2019
- Herbie Hancock & Kamasi Washington - August 10, 2019
- Ben Harper & The Innocent Criminals - August 17, 2019
- North Coast Music Festival - August 30, 2019
- North Coast Music Festival - August 31, 2019
- Social Distortion & Flogging Molly - September 7, 2019
- The Avett Brothers with Trampled By Turtles - September 20, 2019

=== 2018 ===
- Nathaniel Rateliff and the Night Sweats & The Head and the Heart - May 31, 2018
- Post Malone - June 5, 2018
- Primus - June 6, 2018
- Alt-J - June 7, 2018
- Steve Miller Band & Peter Frampton - June 14, 2018
- Thirty Seconds To Mars - June 15, 2018
- Ray LaMontagne with Neko Case - June 16, 2018
- Dave Matthews Band - June 29, 2018
- Dave Matthews Band - June 30, 2018
- Kidz Bop Kids - July 1, 2018
- Paramore - July 2, 2018
- Styx - July 7, 2018
- Foreigner & Whitesnake with Jason Bonham - July 11, 2018
- Barenaked Ladies - July 13, 2018
- V103 Summer Block Party - July 14, 2018
- 3 Doors Down & Collective Soul - July 24, 2018
- Coheed and Cambria & Taking Back Sunday - July 26, 2018
- Jeff Beck, Paul Rodgers, and Ann Wilson - July 29, 2018
- Charlie Puth - July 31, 2018
- Slightly Stoopid - August 12, 2018
- G-Eazy - August 14, 2018
- 311 & The Offspring - September 6, 2018
- Needtobreathe - September 8, 2018
- Dispatch - September 15, 2018

=== 2017 ===
- Jack Johnson - June 1, 2017
- Jack Johnson - June 2, 2017
- Rise Against & Deftones - June 9, 2017
- Dave Matthews Band - June 10, 2017
- Dave Matthews Band - June 11, 2017
- Elvis Costello and the Imposters - June 12, 2017
- Paul Simon - June 14, 2018
- Don Henley - June 17, 2018
- Dispatch - July 1, 2017
- 311 - July 2, 2017
- Lindsey Buckingham and Christine McVie - July 3, 2017
- Third Eye Blind with Silversun Pickups - July 6, 2017
- Gorillaz - July 8, 2017
- Slightly Stoopid - July 9, 2017
- Chicago & The Doobie Brothers - July 12, 2017
- Straight No Chaser & Post Modern Jukebox - July 13, 2017
- Phish - July 14, 2017
- Phish - July 15, 2017
- Phish - July 16, 2017
- V103 Summer Block Party - July 22, 2017
- Violent Femmes with Echo & The Bunnyman - July 23, 2017
- Goo Goo Dolls - July 24, 2017
- Kidz Bop Kids - July 30, 2017
- Dropkick Murphys & Rancid - August 8, 2017
- Foreigner - August 9, 2017
- Nickelback - August 12, 2017
- Pretty Lights - August 18, 2017
- Pretty Lights - August 19, 2017
- Logic - August 24, 2017
- Ms. Lauryn Hill & Nas - September 7, 2017
- Sublime & The Offspring - September 8, 2017
- Young The Giant - September 9, 2017
- Sturgill Simpson - September 22, 2017
- Umphrey's McGee - September 23, 2017

=== 2016 ===
- Chris Stapleton - June 2, 2016
- Dashboard Confessional, Taking Back Sunday, Saosin & The Early November - June 3, 2016
- Steely Dan & Steve Winwood - June 11, 2016
- Joe Walsh & Bad Company - June 23, 2016
- Brand New & Modest Mouse - July 2, 2016
- 311 - July 8, 2016
- Erykah Badu - July 15, 2016
- Gregg Allman Band - July 16, 2016
- Sublime with Rome & Dirty Heads - July 17, 2016
- Heart with Joan Jett - July 19, 2016
- Goo Goo Dolls - July 26, 2016
- Ray LaMontagne - August 6, 2016
- Kidz Bop Kids - August 7, 2016
- Josh Groban - August 9, 2016
- Shinedown, Halestorm, Blackstone Cherry & Whiskey Myers - August 16, 2016
- Mad Decent Block Party - August 21, 2016
- Counting Crows & Rob Thomas - August 24, 2016
- Slightly Stoopid - August 26, 2016
- Fifth Harmony - August 31, 2016
- Sammy Hagar - September 2, 2016
- Bryan Adams - September 15, 2016
- Pretty Lights - September 23, 2016
- Pretty Lights - September 24, 2016

=== 2015 ===
- Barenaked Ladies - June 16, 2015
- Dashboard Confessional & Third Eye Blind - June 26, 2015
- John Fogerty - July 8, 2015
- Jill Scott - July 11, 2015
- Rise Against - July 17, 2015
- The Outcry Tour - July 24, 2015
- Bryan Adams - July 25, 2015
- Australian Pink Floyd & Led Zeppelin 2 - July 30, 2015
- Jim Gaffigan - August 6, 2015
- Smashing Pumpkins & Marilyn Manson - August 7, 2015
- Yes & Toto - August 16, 2015
- Sublime with Rome & Rebelution - August 20, 2015
- Rick Springfield, Loverboy, and The Romantics - September 10, 2015
- Counting Crows - September 12, 2015
- Farm Aid - September 19, 2015
- Robert Plant - September 23, 2015

=== 2005 ===
- Earth, Wind & Fire & Chicago - June 25, 2005
- New Edition, Brian McKnight, & Gerald Levert - June 26, 2005
- Camper Van Beethoven - June 28, 2005
- Ralph's World - July 2, 2005
- Missy Higgins - July 14, 2005
- Journey - July 16, 2005
- Sugar Water Festival - July 29, 2005
- Sugar Water Festival - August 10, 2005
- Unwritten Law, Papa Roach, & 311 - August 11, 2005
- Ratt, Quiet Riot, FireHouse, & Cinderella - August 12, 2005
- Kelly Clarkson - August 13, 2005
- Destiny's Child - August 16, 2005
- Jack Johnson, Matt Costa, & Animal Liberation Orchestra - August 28, 2005
- LoopFest 2005 - September 4, 2005

== Filmed performances ==
- Incubus – Look Alive, filmed July 25, 2007 and released November 27, 2007
- O.A.R. – Rain or Shine, recorded June 18–19, 2009 and released January 12, 2010
- Jason Mraz – Beautiful Mess: Live on Earth, filmed August 13, 2009 and released November 6, 2009
- 311 – 311: Live in Chicago, filmed July 14, 2011
- Two Friends - Big Bootie Land Chicago Concert Premiere, filmed on June 2, 2024, and released on September 12, 2023
- King Gizzard and the Lizard Wizard - Live In Chicago '24, filmed September 1, 2024 and released on October 21, 2024

== See also ==
- List of contemporary amphitheatres
