= Northerly Island =

Human-made peninsula with a park in Chicago

Coordinates: 41.8604°N 87.6083°W

- Northerly Island Park
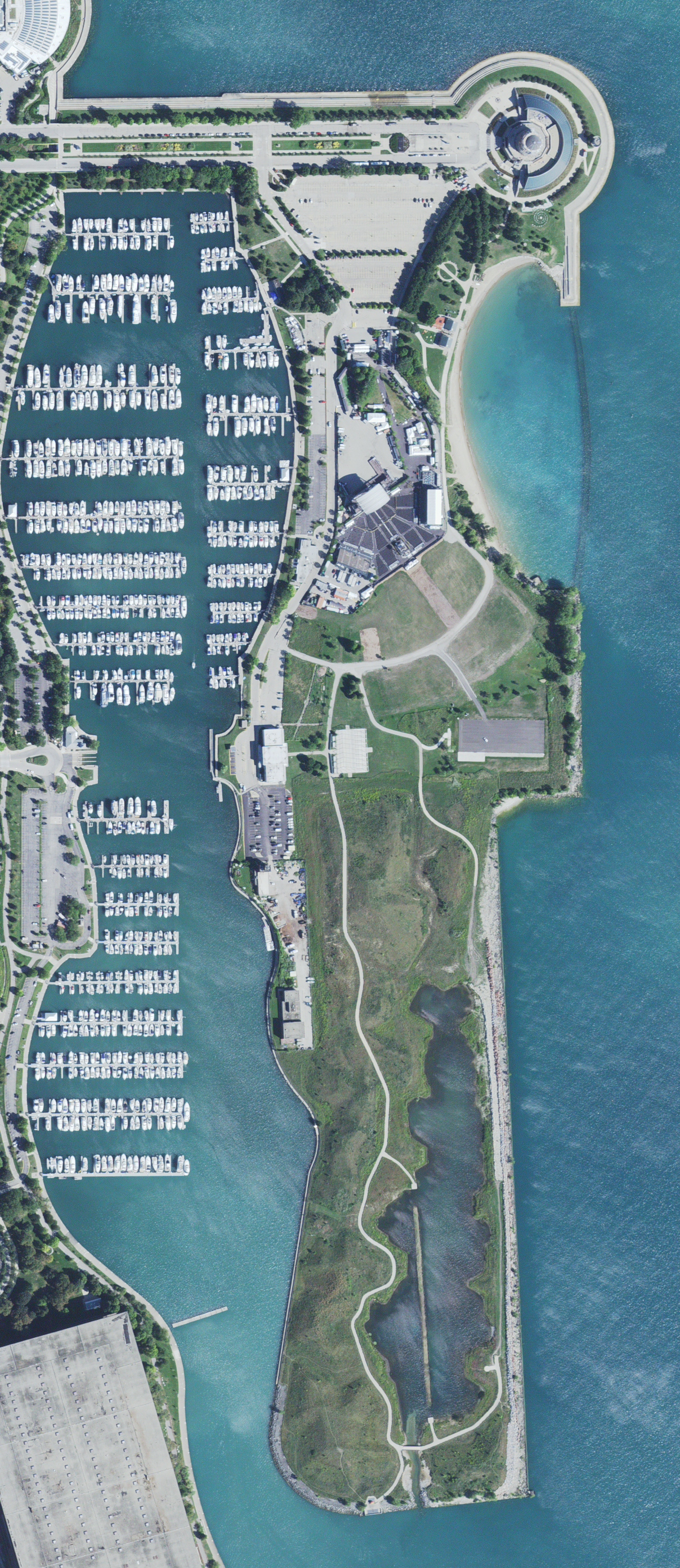
- Aerial view of Northerly Island in 2021
- Interactive map of Northerly Island
- Location: Chicago, Illinois, United States
- Area: 119-acre (48 ha)
- Designer: Studio Gang, Daniel Burnham
- Owner: Chicago Park District
- Open: 6:00 am-11:00 pm

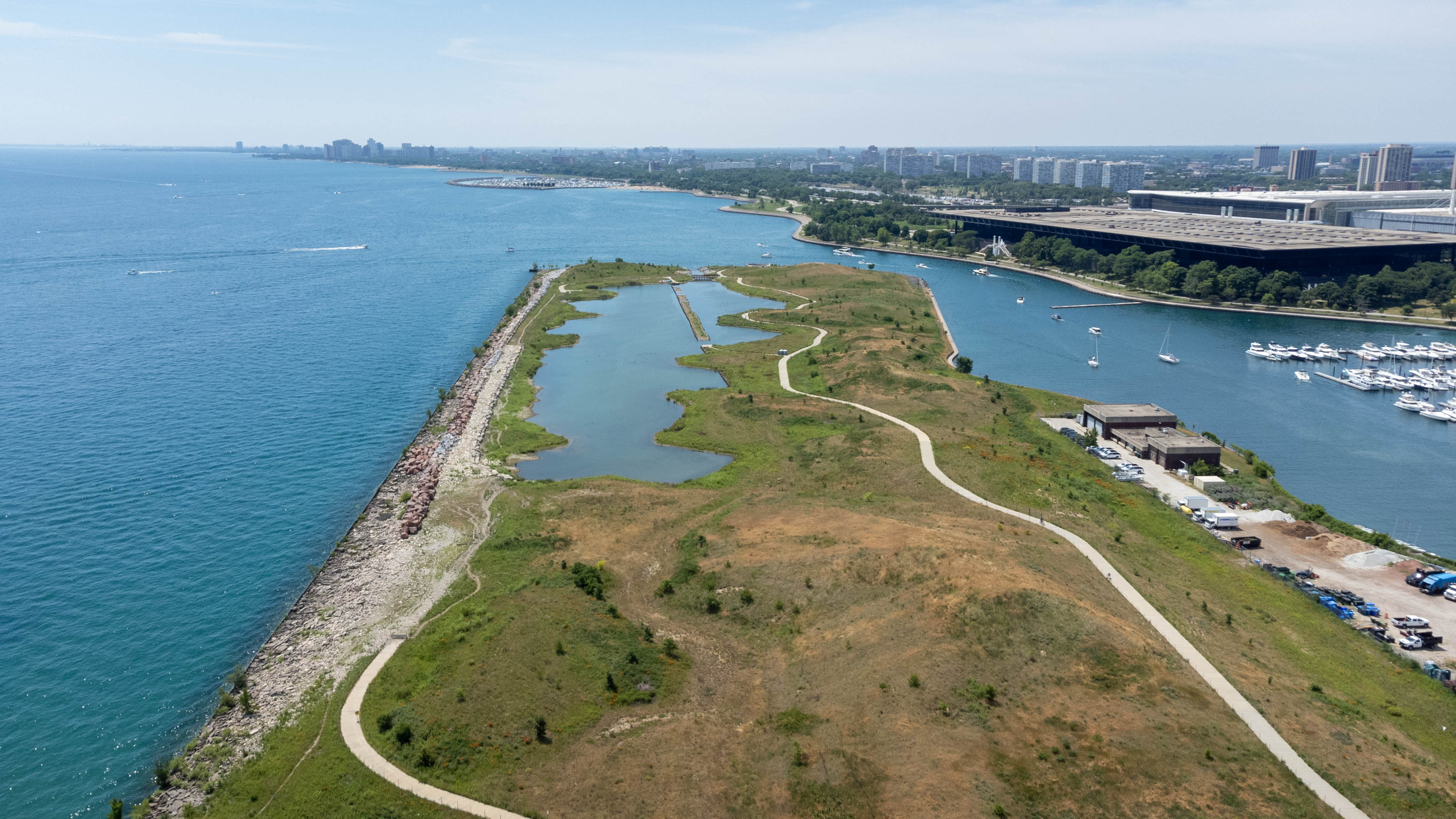
Northerly Island Natural Area on south half of Northerly Island

Northerly Island (also Northerly Island Park) is a 119-acre (48 ha) man-made peninsula and park located on Chicago's Lake Michigan lakefront. Originally constructed in 1925, Northerly Island was the former site of the Century of Progress world's fair and later Meigs Field airport and, since Meigs Field's closure, has been a recreational area part of Chicago's Museum Campus. It is the site of the Adler Planetarium, the Huntington Bank Pavilion (a semi-temporary concert venue), the Northerly Island Natural Area, the 12th Street Beach and numerous art installations. Per its name, Northerly Island was constructed as an island, but is connected to the lakefront by a causeway at the northern end carrying Solidarity Drive to the planetarium.

Solidarity Drive is dominated by Neoclassical sculptures of Tadeusz Kościuszko, Karel Havlíček Borovský and Copernicus.

== History ==
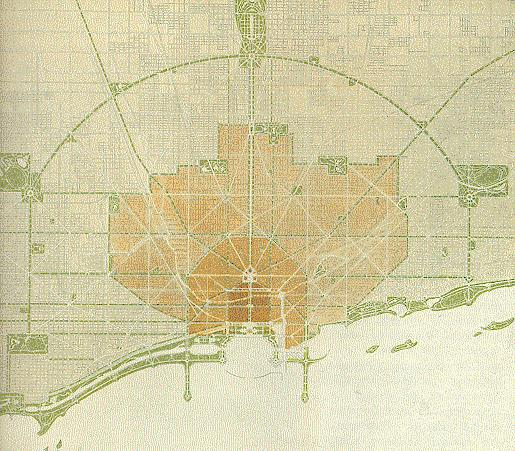
Burnham's Plan of Chicago showing proposed lakefront park and lagoons

The initial plans that led to the construction of Northerly Island were inspired by the 1893 Columbian Exposition, which saw the significant expansion of Jackson Park. Following that success, in 1894 the South Park Commission proposed improvements to the lakefront from Jackson Park to Grant Park that led to an 1896 plan to connect the two parks with a new outer belt of parks enclosing a shoreline lagoon.

Daniel Burnham's 1909 "Plan of Chicago" renewed the call for the creation of a chain of lakefront parks between Jackson Park and 12th Street. Northerly Island was the only lakefront structure to be built based on that Plan. Northerly Island forms the southern end of Chicago Harbor, and the eastern boundary of Burnham Harbor. As indicated by the color green on the original plan, the island was to be populated by trees and grass for the public enjoyment. Daniel Burnham died in 1912. By 1916, Edward H. Bennett, co-author of the Plan of Chicago, wrote that a lakefront location would be most suitable for an airport serving the central business district. By 1922, Chicago Mayor William Hale Thompson recommended locating the downtown airport at Northerly Island.

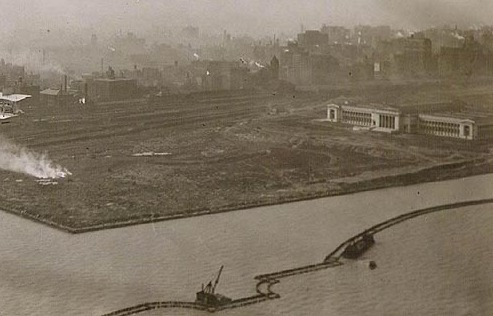
Construction in 1921

Work on the island began in 1920 when Chicago voters approved a $20 million bond issue to create Northerly Island, with construction completed by 1925.

A short time later in 1930, the Adler Planetarium was built; and in 1933–34 the island was at the center of festivities at the "Century of Progress" World's Fair. Taking part in the Century of Progress Exposition, 24 Italian Savoia-Marchetti S55X flying boats, under the command of General Italo Balbo, make the first transatlantic formation flight between Italy and Chicago. Only flying boats could be used because Chicago did not yet have a suitable nearby airport, except for Grant Park, which was occasionally used as a landing strip.

Local publishing mogul Merrill C. Meigs supported earlier recommendations for converting Northerly Island into an airport, but construction did not begin for numerous reasons, such as lack of funds during the Great Depression and WWII. Construction did not begin until after a competing proposal to host the United Nations Headquarters on the island was lost in 1946. The Works Progress Administration connected the island to the mainland via a causeway at 12th Street in 1938. During this period Northerly Island was full of paths and walkways as well as a beach at 12th Street.

=== Transformation from an airport into a park ===
In 1994, Mayor Richard M. Daley announced plans to close the airport and build a park in its place. In 1996, the Chicago Park District, which owned Northerly Island, refused to renew the airport lease. The city briefly closed the airport from the expiration of the lease in October 1996 through February 1997 when pressure from the state legislature persuaded them to reopen the airport.

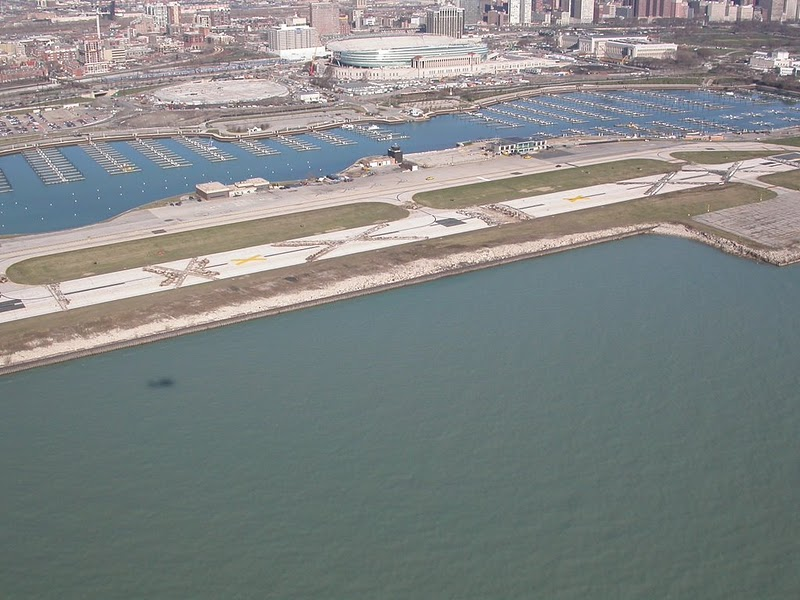
Meigs Field Runway a few days after demolition ordered by Mayor Daley. The large X marks were cut into the runway by bulldozers to prevent aircraft from taking off or landing.

Ultimately on the night of March 30, 2003, Mayor Daley ordered city crews to make the runway unusable by bulldozing large X-shaped gouges into the runway surface in the middle of the night.

Daley defended his actions by claiming it would save the City of Chicago the effort of further court battles before the airport could close. He claimed that safety concerns required the closure, due to the post-September 11 risk of terrorist-controlled aircraft attacking the downtown waterfront near Meigs Field.

While aviation interests and commentators decried the move, supporters of the park believe it was in the city's best interest for the land to be a park.

In 2005, an outdoor concert venue opened on the northern part of Northerly Island. Originally named Charter One Pavilion, it was expanded in 2013 and renamed to First Merit Bank Pavilion, and as of January 2017 it is named Huntington Bank Pavilion.

In December 2010, the Chicago Park District unveiled its framework plan for Northerly Island, to be completed over the next 20–30 years. The planned park would provide a variety of uses year-round with ecology and education central themes. A reef would be built, and the park would be designated into zones of "passive" and "active" relating to the amount of human activity.

In 2015, a 40-acre park opened on the southern part of the island. The park features a concrete trail for walking and bicycle riding, a lagoon, and landscaped wildlife habitats.

== Today ==
Northerly Island's nature preserve is meant to revitalize the environment that was originally there. The new park is now home to migratory birds and natural wildlife. To protect its new inhabitants, dogs are not allowed on the park.

The mile of paved paths has no lighting to create as natural of an environment as possible. The park is open until 11:00 PM, and it is advised by park security to bring a flashlight.

The park is home to many of Illinois' natural wildlife, including monarch butterflies and herons. The park's 5-acre lagoon welcomes many kinds of animals. To make the park as inviting to these animals as possible, over 11,000 shrubs and 400 trees were planted.

The creation of the lagoon led to considerable weakening of the eastern shore of Northerly Island. Stones were piled high enough to hamper the view of Lake Michigan. Erosion continued, destroying and closing most of the east side trail. The city has plans for repairs but no timetable.

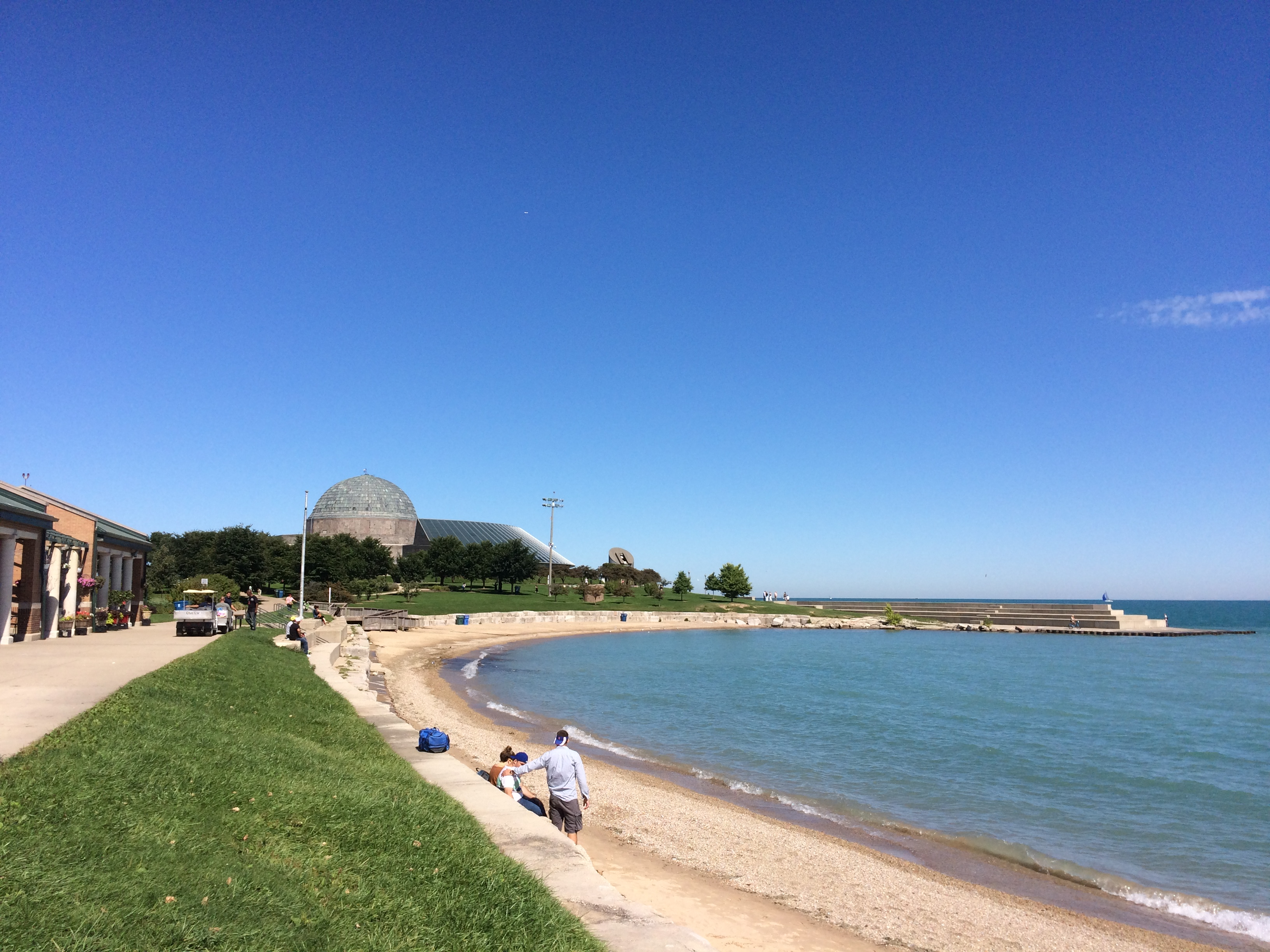
Northerly Island Beach

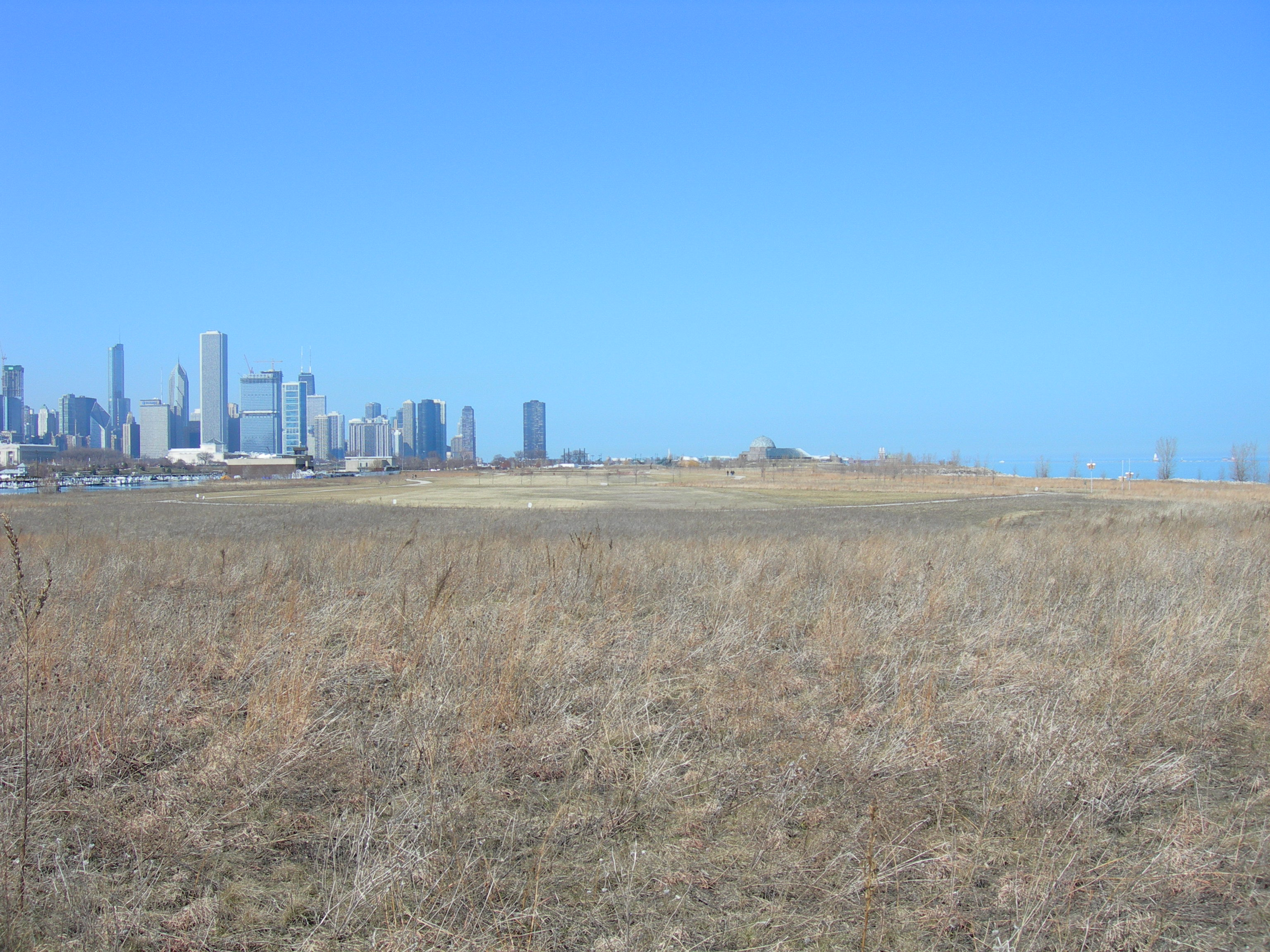
Looking North

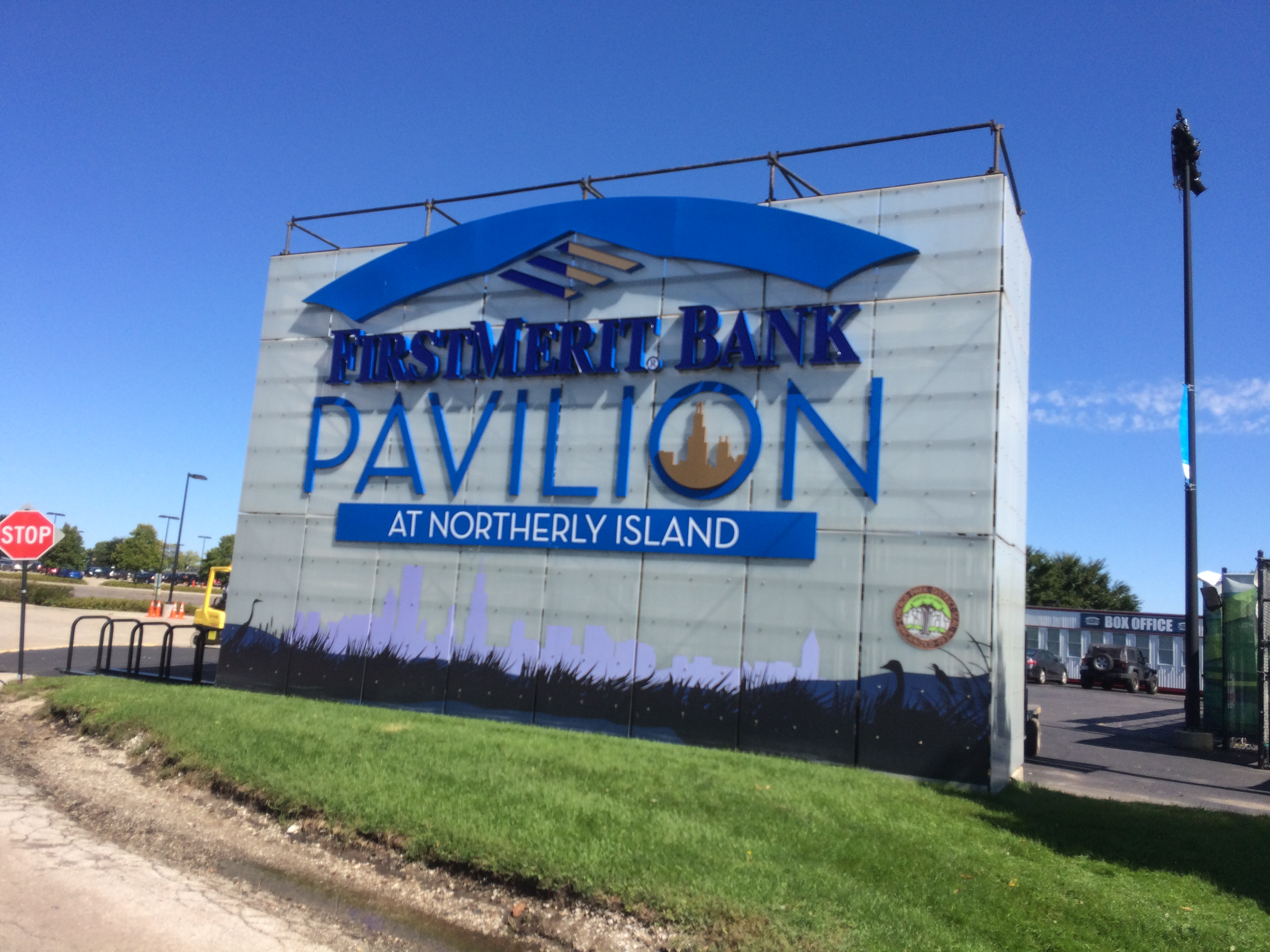
FirstMerit Bank Pavilion

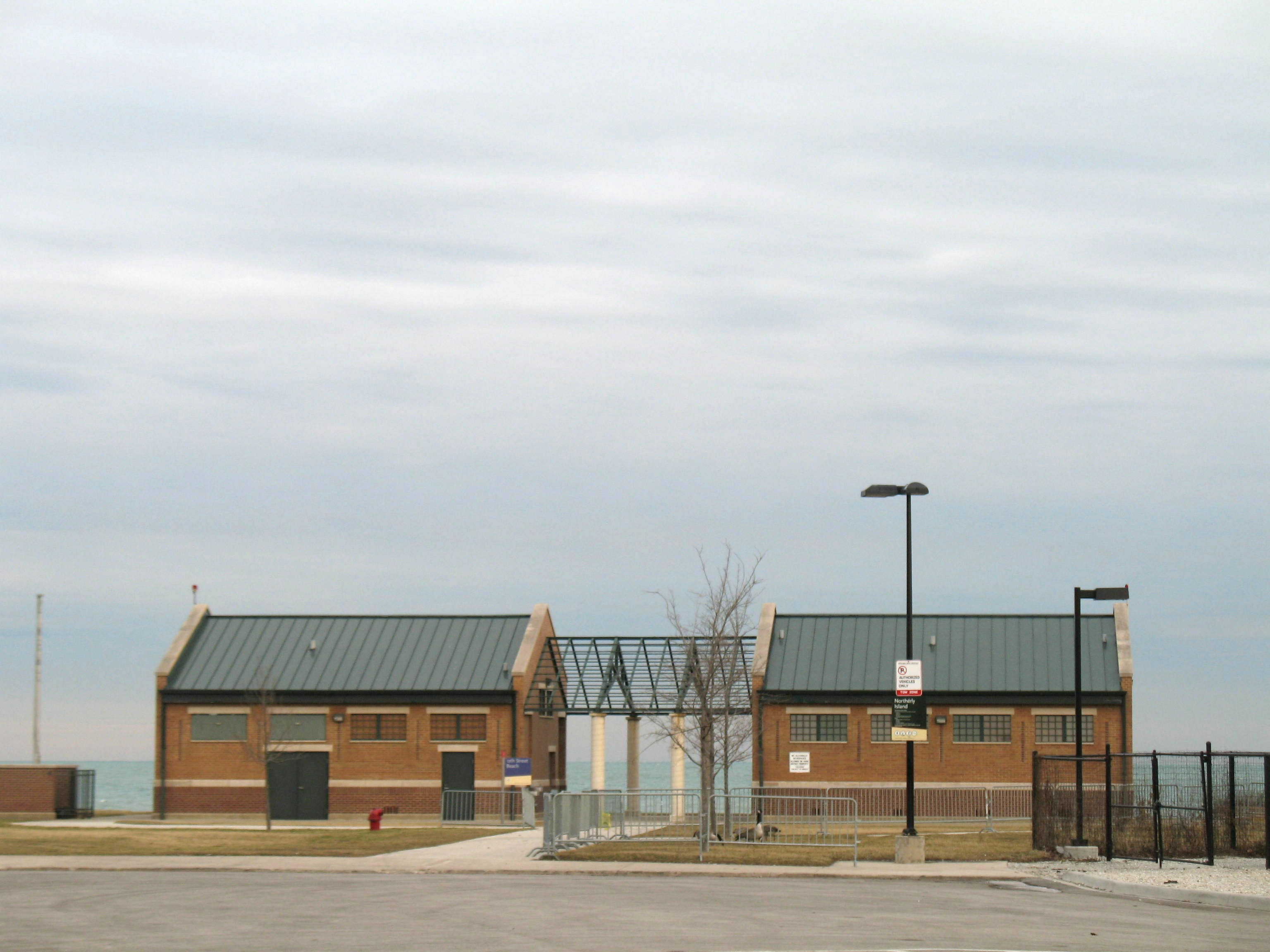
Twelfth Street Beach House

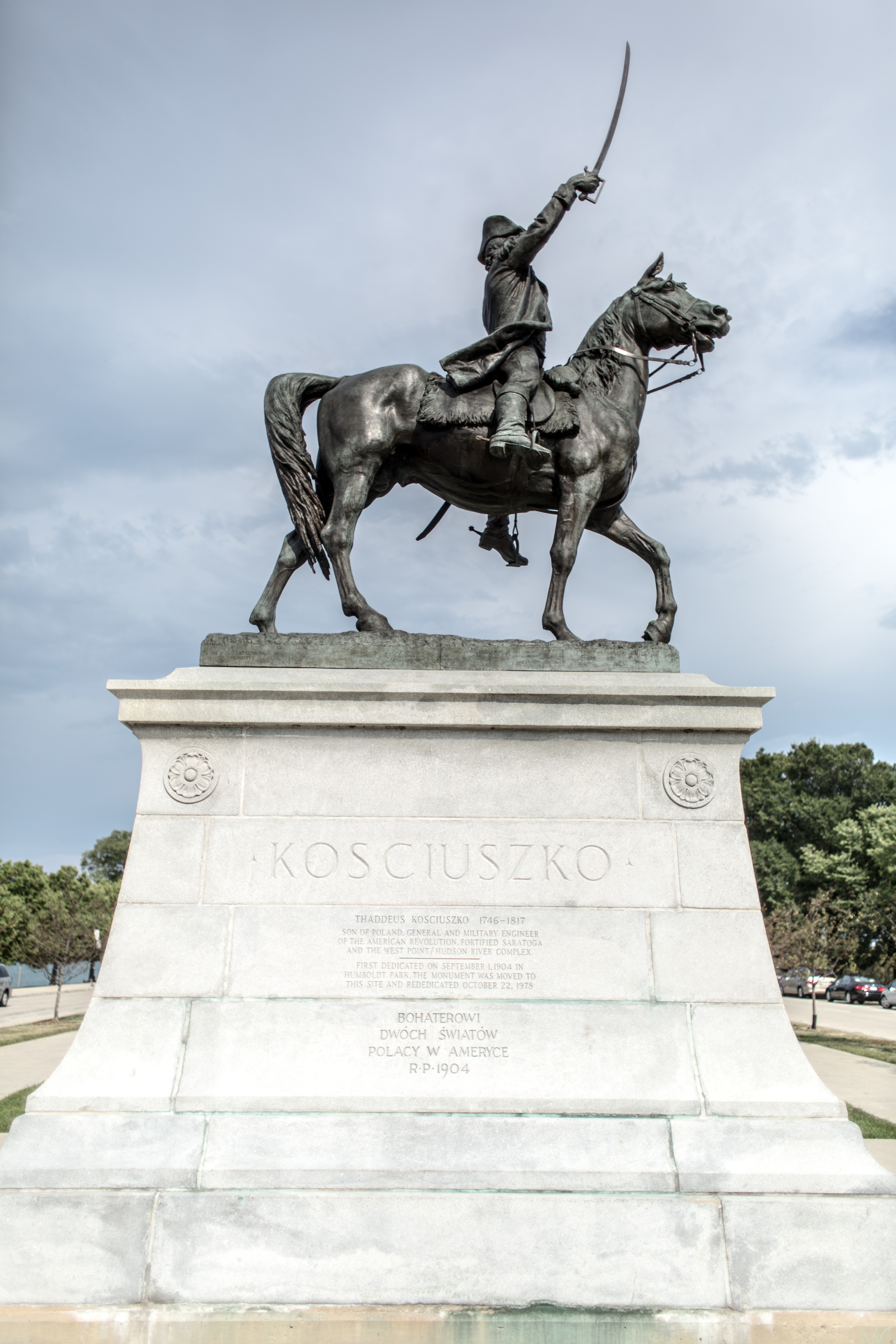
Statue of Tadeusz Kościuszko on Northerly Island, Chicago

== Events and activities ==
=== The Great Chicago Fire Festival ===
On September 26, 2015, the closing ceremonies of the second annual Great Chicago Fire Festival were held on Northerly Island after the festival was moved from its original location on the Chicago Riverfront in 2014. This event is put on by Redmoon Theater in conjunction with the City of Chicago and Chicago Park District and is meant to commemorate the Great Chicago Fire of 1871. The closing ceremony includes a dramatic burning of the "GRIT House," food concessions, performance stages, and a dramatic fireworks finale, among other things.

=== Community events ===
The Chicago Park District hosts many events on Northerly Island to allow individuals and families to take advantage of all the natural area the park has to offer.

==== Polar Adventure Days ====
During the winter months, the Chicago Park District hosts Polar Adventure Days, allowing parents to bring their children and experience nature in ways that would normally not be possible for those living in a city environment. On these Polar Adventure Days, the Park District offers free snowshoe rental (when there are 3 or more inches of snow) and cross country skiing, as well as a host of indoor activities in the Northerly Island Visitors Center.
