= Chicago Park District =

Public park district in Chicago, US

Agency overview
- Formed: Consolidated in 1934; Predecessors founded in 1869
- Jurisdiction: Government of Chicago
- Headquarters: 4830 S. Western Ave Chicago, Illinois
- Annual budget: $385 million
- Agency executive: General Superintendent and CEO, Carlos Ramirez-Rosa
- Website: chicagoparkdistrict.com

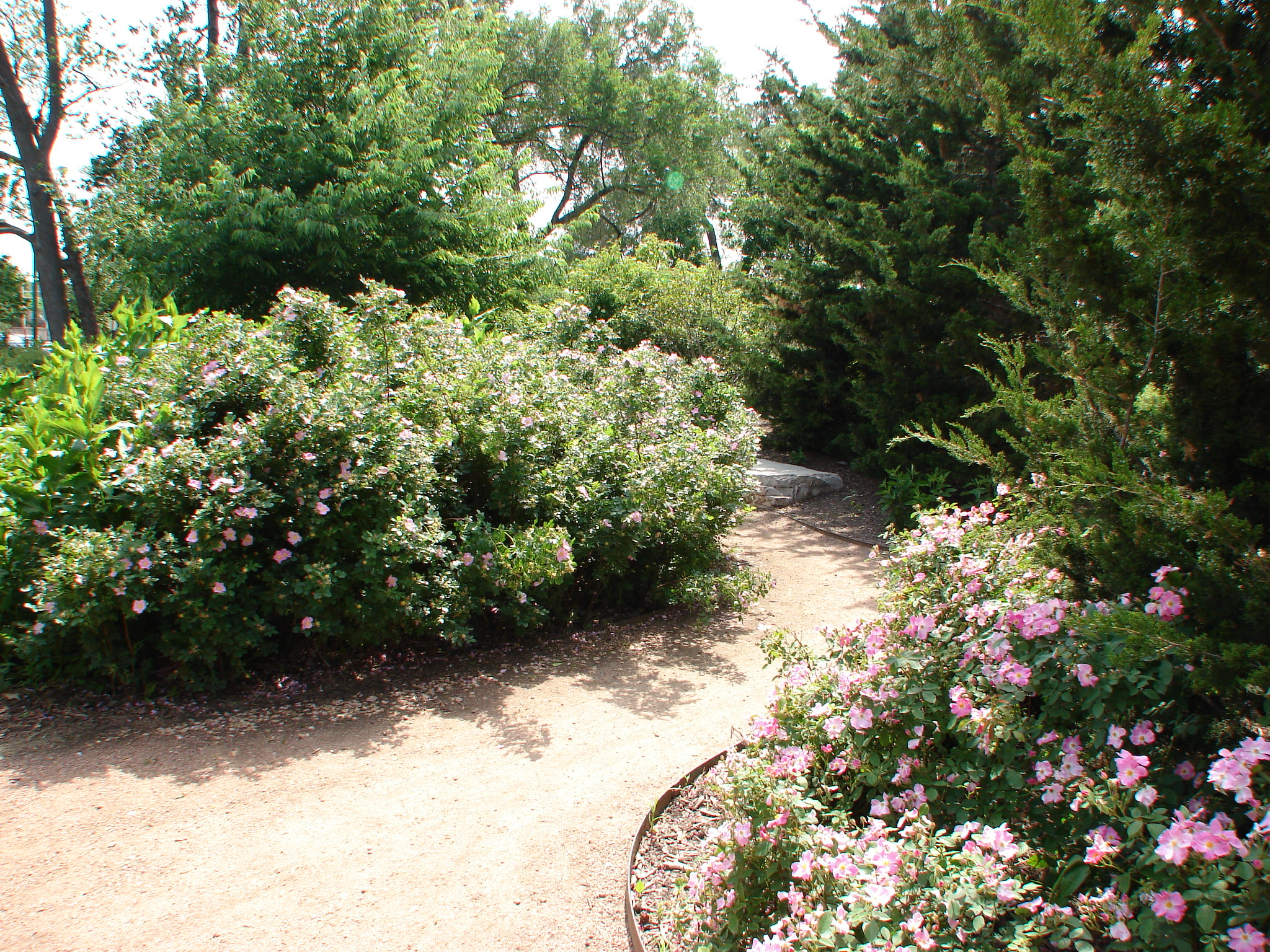
A footpath in Portage Park

The Chicago Park District is a municipal government agency of the City of Chicago. It is one of the oldest and the largest park districts in the United States.

As of 2016, there are over 600 parks included in the Chicago Park District as well as 27 beaches, 10 boat docking harbors, two botanic conservatories, a zoo, 11 museums, and one stadium. The Chicago Park District also has more than over 230 field houses, 78 public pools, and dozens of sports and recreational facilities, with year-round programming. It also owns and operates the lakefront stadium, Soldier Field, which the Chicago Bears and Chicago Fire FC lease. The district is an independent taxing authority as defined by Illinois State Statute and is considered a separate (or "sister") agency of the City of Chicago. The district's headquarters are located in the Brighton Park community area on the West Side of Chicago.

== Jurisdiction ==
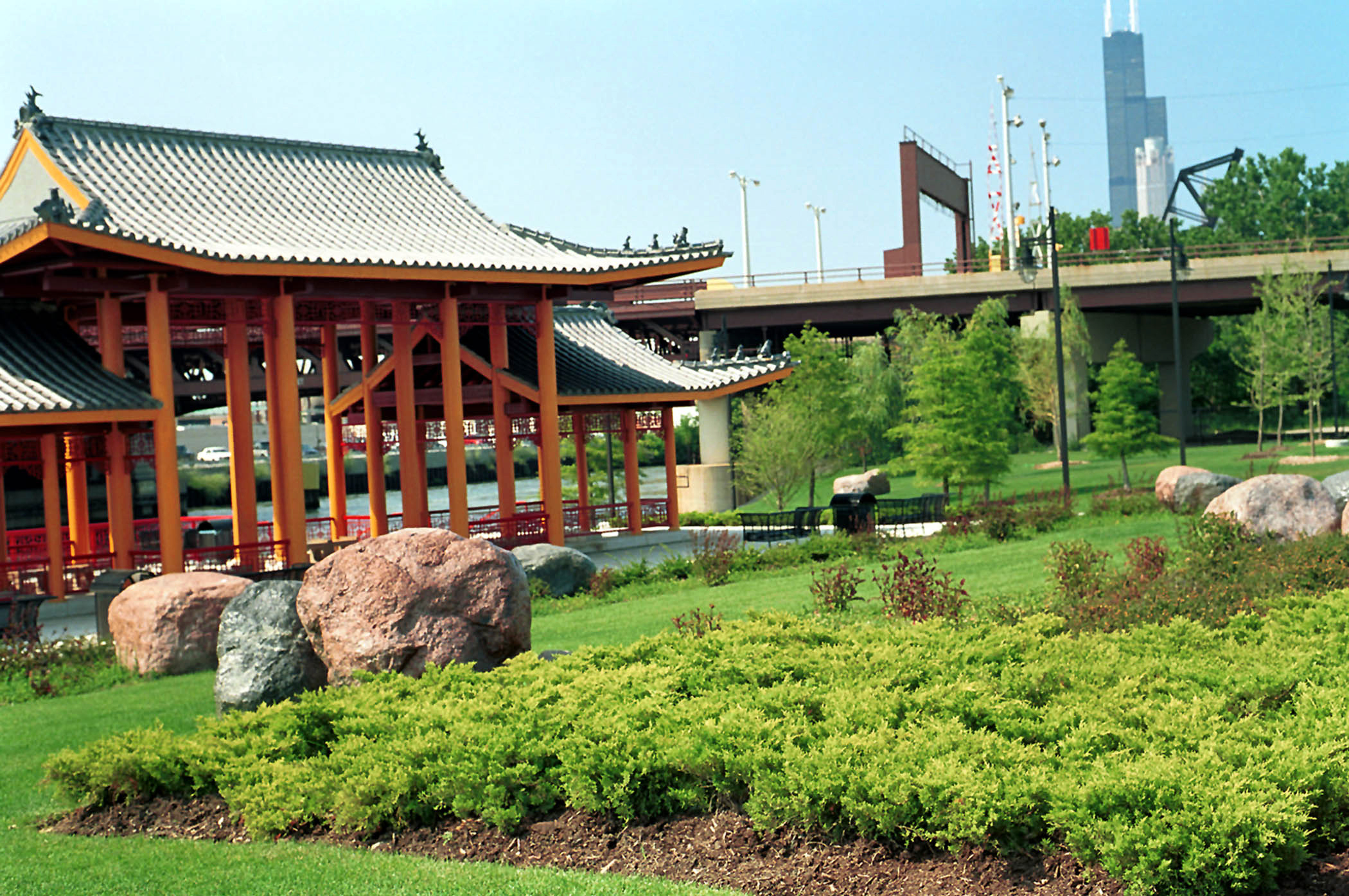
The riverfront pavilion in Ping Tom Memorial Park

The Chicago Park District oversees more than 600 parks with over 8,800 acres (3,600 ha) of municipal parkland including their field houses, as well as 27 beaches, 78 pools, 11 museums, two world-class botanical conservatories, 16 historic lagoons and 10 bird and wildlife gardens that are found within the city limits. A number of these are tourist destinations, most notably Lincoln Park, Chicago's largest park which has over 20 million visitors each year, second only to Central Park in New York City in the United States. With 10 lakefront boat harbors located within a number of parks along the lakefront, the Chicago Park District is also the nation's largest municipal harbor system.

A number of Chicago Park District parks are located in the vicinity of or even adjacent to a number of Chicago Public Schools. This design was done in order to make it easier for public school students and faculty to incorporate school assignments or physical activities into the learning experience. Additionally, a number of Chicago Public Library locations are sited within Chicago Park District facilities.

The Chicago Park District is governed by a board of seven non-salaried Commissioners who are appointed by the Mayor of the City of Chicago with the approval of the Chicago City Council.

=== Notable parks ===
- Bloomingdale Trail Park - The longest greenway project of a former elevated rail line in the Western Hemisphere, and the second longest in the world.
- Burnham Park - 598 acres (242 ha); runs along the Lakefront for much of the South Side connecting Jackson Park with Grant Park.
- Calumet Park - 200 acres (81 ha); shares a border with the State of Indiana, and is also located on the lake.
- Columbus Park - 144 acres (58 ha); on the far west side of Chicago, considered one of the 150 Great Places in Illinois.
- Douglass (Anna and Frederick) Park - 173 acres (70 ha) and named after Frederick Douglass and his wife Anna Murray Douglass; it is Southwest of downtown.
- Garfield Park - 185 acres (75 ha); this west side park contains a grand botanical conservatory and lagoon.
- Grant Park - 319 acres (129 ha); located near The Loop; Home to Buckingham Fountain, this downtown park is also a favorite site of major festivals including the Taste of Chicago, Chicago Blues Festival, Chicago Jazz Festival, Lollapolooza and others.
- Humboldt Park - 207 acres (84 ha) on the west side, has a cultural center for Chicago's Puerto Rican Community.
- Jackson Park - 500 acres (200 ha); located on the south side of the city on Lake Michigan, this park is famous for its role in the 1893 World's Columbian Exposition.
- Lincoln Park - 1,200 acres (490 ha); Chicago's largest city park. Located north of The Loop, this is one of the more distinctive parks in terms of geography, because while its oldest section is located in the Lincoln Park community area, it spans many different neighborhoods throughout the north side, running along the shore near Lake Shore Drive and Lake Michigan.
- Marquette Park - 300 acres (120 ha); the largest park in southwest Chicago, it has a golf course and many other attractions.
- Millennium Park - 24.5 acres (9.9 ha); Chicago's newest marquee park, opened in 2004, just north of the Art Institute of Chicago in Grant Park.
- Park No. 474 - 0.01 acres (0.0040 ha); the city and state's smallest park, with a total area of only 54 square feet, completely occupied by a sculpture.
- Washington Park - 372 acres (151 ha); located on the south side, it was the proposed location for the 2016 Summer Olympics Stadium.

== History ==
In the 1860s, Chicago already had about 40 small parks, but no central plan, and it fell far short when compared to other major cities in the country. Lincoln Park was Chicago's first large park, created in 1860. Dr. John H. Rauch MD, who was a member of the Chicago Board of Health and later a president of the Illinois State Board of Health, played a key role in establishing Lincoln Park by persuading city officials to close several festering cemeteries filled with shallow graves of victims of infectious epidemics. Rauch next formulated a central plan for parks across the entire city, noting that they were "the lungs of the city", and pointing out that Chicago's parks were inferior to those in New York's Central Park, Baltimore's Druid Hill Park, and Philadelphia's Fairmount Park. His influence was key in setting up Chicago's modern park system.

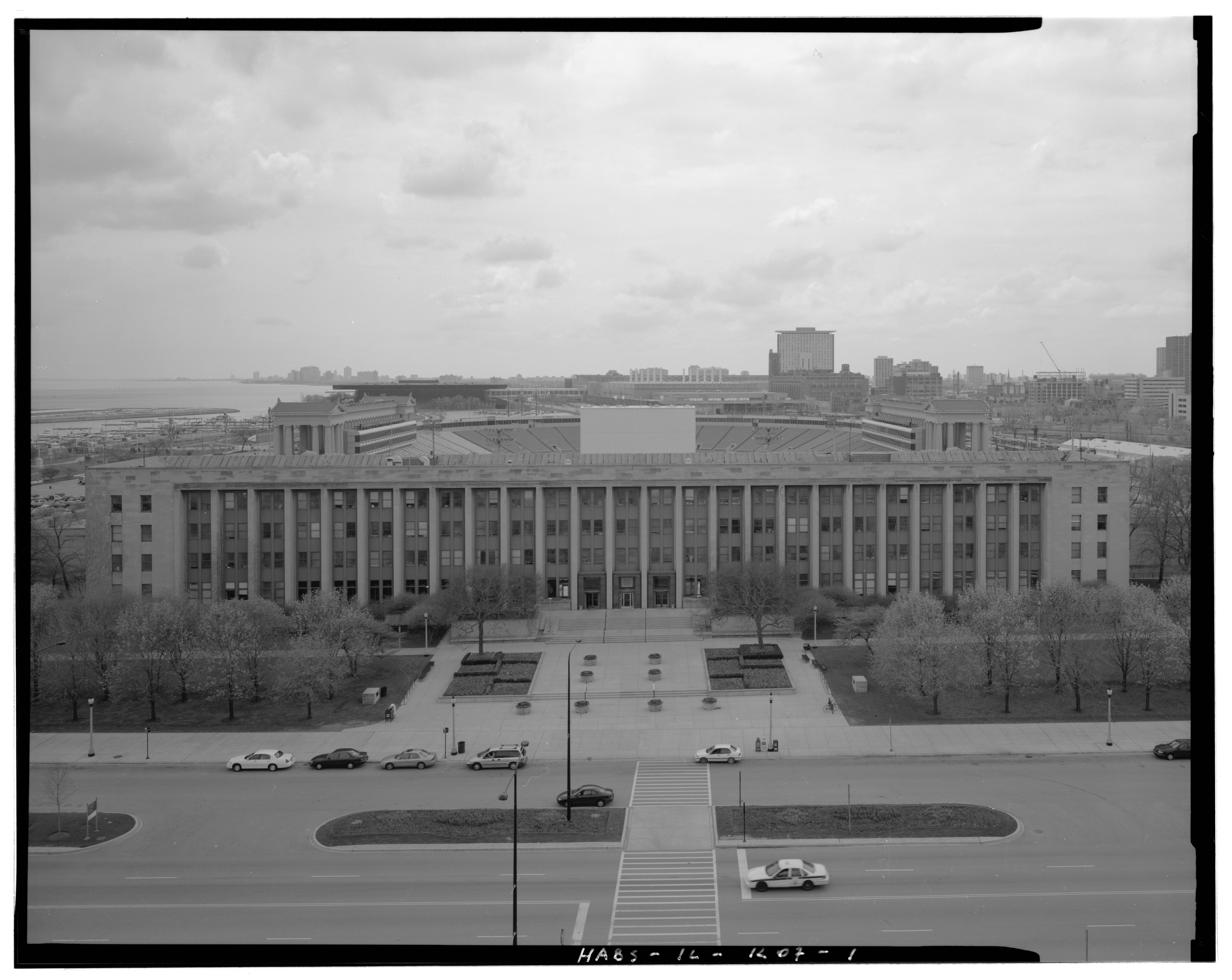
The (now-demolished) Chicago Park District Administration Building at 425 East McFetridge Drive (adjacent to Soldier Field), as photographed circa 1998–2002 facing southward from the roof of the Field Museum

The current Chicago Park District was created in 1934 by the Illinois Legislature under the Park Consolidation Act (70 ILCS 1505 et seq). By provisions of that act, the Chicago Park District consolidated and superseded the then-existing 22 separate park districts in Chicago, the largest three of which were the Lincoln Park, West Park, and South Park Districts, all of which had been established in 1869. In the late 1960s, the district lent its support for a Special Olympics for developmental challenged children. The Park District co-sponsored the first Special Olympics at Soldier Field in 1968.

In the past several years, the Park District has initiated a program of renovating and beautifying existing parks and playgrounds, as well as initiating the building of a number of new parks, including Ping Tom Memorial Park, Ellis Park, DuSable Park, Maggie Daley Park and others. The Chicago Park District has also expanded programming in neighborhood parks throughout the city, and created a lakefront concert venue on Northerly Island on the site of the former Meigs Field airport. In 2014, the district won the National Gold Medal Award for Excellence in Parks and Recreation.

=== Police Department ===
The Chicago Park District Police Department was a law enforcement that was operated by the Chicago Park District. The department was established on May 1, 1934, and operated until being disbanded and absorbed by the Chicago Police Department on December 31, 1958. The territorial limits of the agency were the municipal boundaries of Chicago. The department was given jurisdiction over 135 parks, including facilities housed within the parks (such as swimming beaches, outdoor swimming pools, field houses, recreation centers, the Lincoln Park Zoo, the Garfield Park Conservatory, and the Lincoln Park Conservatory. The department also had jurisdiction over the 205 miles (330 km) of boulevards that are part of the Chicago park and boulevard system, as well as 28 miles (45 km) of Lake Michigan shoreline.

Similar to other Park District employees, members of the force of 639 officers were recruited by the Chicago Park District Civil Service Board and were directly employed by the Park District. Since the Park District had its own independent jurisdiction separate from the city government, the department was functionally unattached to the Chicago Police Department, despite close cooperation between the two departments.

The department was responsible for the enforcement of park ordinances, state laws, and the preservation of peace and good order. Its Division of Police operated a fleet of approximately 100 two-man squad cars, each with two-way radios. Its central headquarters were housed in the Chicago Park District Administration Building in Burnham Park (which was located behind southmost end of Soldier Field). The department had stations located in several parks, including its North Police Station in the Lincoln Park Administration Building (today the location of the Lincoln Park Cultural Center).

The disbandment of the department came with a Second Consolidation Act for the city's parks, which saw management of the city's boulevards transferred away from the Parks District, ownership of more than 250 parks (previously owned by the city government) transferred to the parks district, and the Parks District Police's force merged into the Chicago Police Department. In Illinois, park district police departments have become a rarity. As of 2017, only 19 of 339 municipal park districts in the state had their own police departments.

=== Parkways Foundation ===
Founded in 1994, Parkways Foundation was the non-profit, philanthropic partner of the Chicago Park District. Parkways sought private investment to enrich the physical and cultural landscape of Chicago's neighborhood parks. The foundation was led by its board of directors and supported by over 200 board members including Chicago's corporate and philanthropic leaders. Parkways invested in capital projects, youth cultural and sports programs, and historic preservation in Chicago's neighborhood parks. Parkways projects focused on underserved neighborhoods for the enrichment of the lives of children and families.

Projects included:

- Washington Park Playground
- Columbus Park Playground- Chicago's first Boundless Playground for children of all abilities
- Inferno Mobile Recording Studio
- Alvin Ailey Dance Camp
- 2 adaptive camps for children with disabilities
- Day Camp and after school scholarships
- Community Garden Grant

Parkways closed on August 31, 2012.

== Museums in the Park ==
Park District land hosts 12 museums in locations around the city. They are:

- Adler Planetarium
- Art Institute of Chicago
- Chicago History Museum
- DuSable Museum of African American History
- Field Museum of Natural History
- John G. Shedd Aquarium
- National Museum of Mexican Art
- National Museum of Puerto Rican Arts and Culture
- Museum of Science and Industry
- Museum of Contemporary Art
- Barack Obama Presidential Center
- Peggy Notebaert Nature Museum

In addition, the district's parks host the free admission Lincoln Park zoological park, the Garfield Park Conservatory, and the Lincoln Park Conservatory.

== Government ==
The Chicago Park District's seven Commissioners govern the district. Under the Chicago Park District code, the Commissioners have a fiduciary duty to act, vote on all matters, and govern the Park District in the best interest of the Park District. The Mayor appoints the General Superintendent and CEO and the Board of Commissioners confirm the appointment. In February 2025, Alderman Carlos Ramirez-Rosa was appointed by Mayor Brandon Johnson and confirmed by the Board of Commissioners to succeed retiring superintendent Rosa Escareño in April 2025.

== Lifeguard Service ==
The Chicago Lifeguard Service, or the Chicago Park District Beaches and Pools Unit, employs over 1000 as aquatics staff during the summer and 300 year round to protect the lives of patrons. Lifeguards are stationed at 23 beaches on Lake Michigan plus one inland beach, as well as, 26 indoor and 51 outdoor pools at city parks and 15 pools in public schools. The Service is the largest municipal lifeguard force in the world and is regularly observed by representatives from Japan, Australia, Ireland, Germany, California, Florida and other locales. The Service also covers more waterfront than any other individual lifeguard force in the world; Chicago beaches cover over 26 miles of the lakefront.

== Facilities ==
The 58,100-square-foot (5,400 m^{2}) headquarters is in Park 596 in Brighton Park.

Its previous headquarters was designed by Holabird & Root. Construction began in 1938 and ended in 1939.

== Image gallery ==
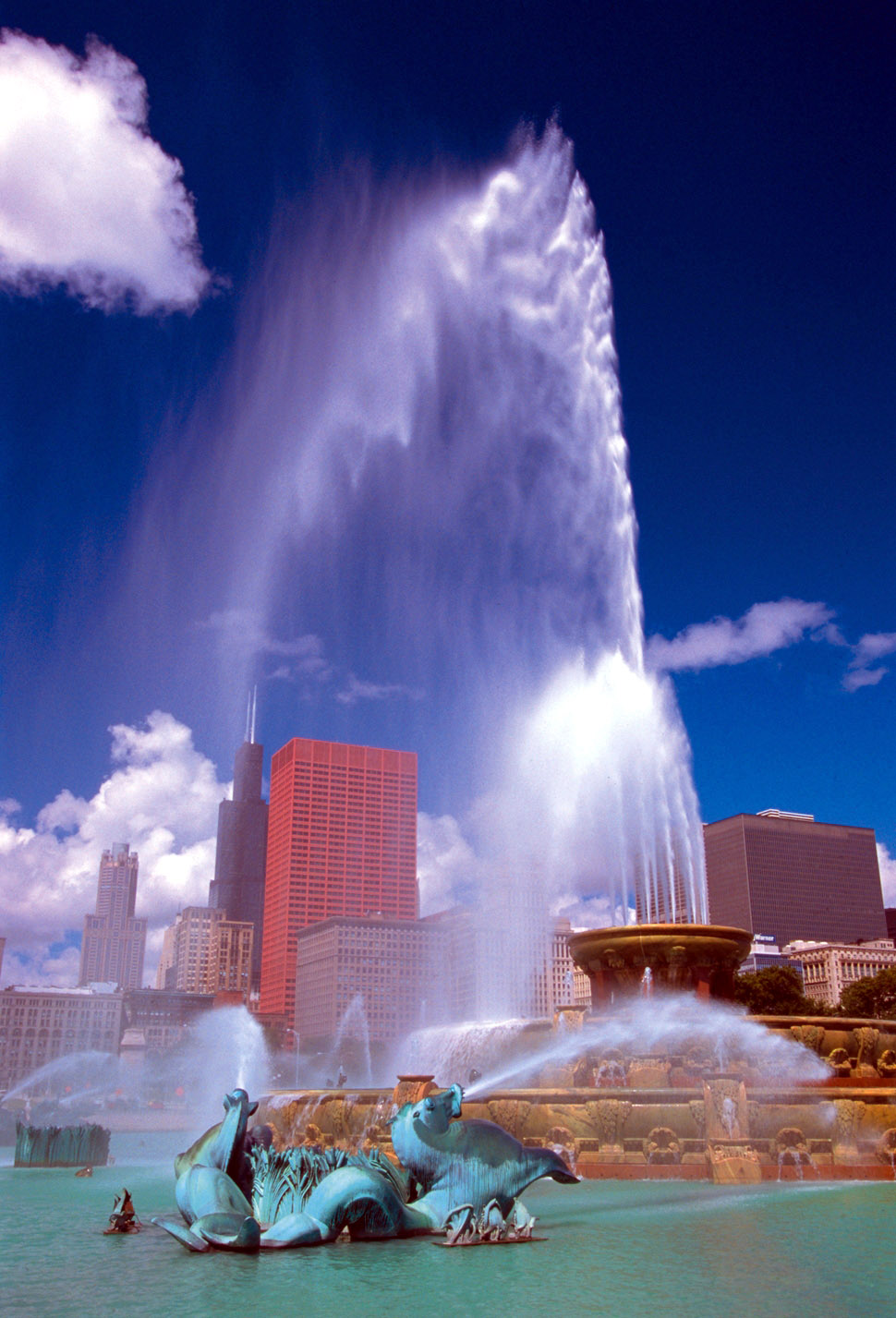
Buckingham Fountain, Grant Park

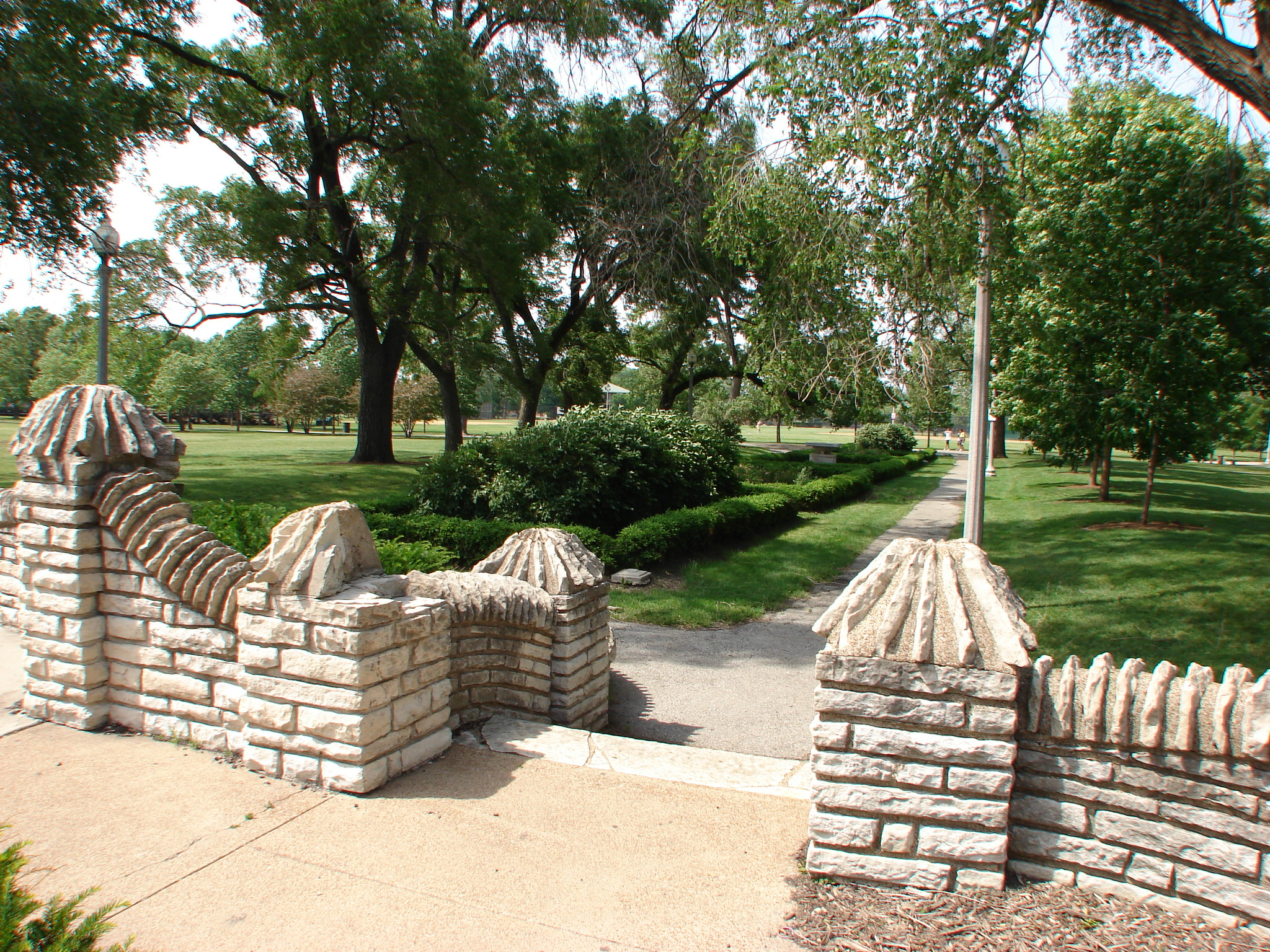
Flagstone steps in Portage Park

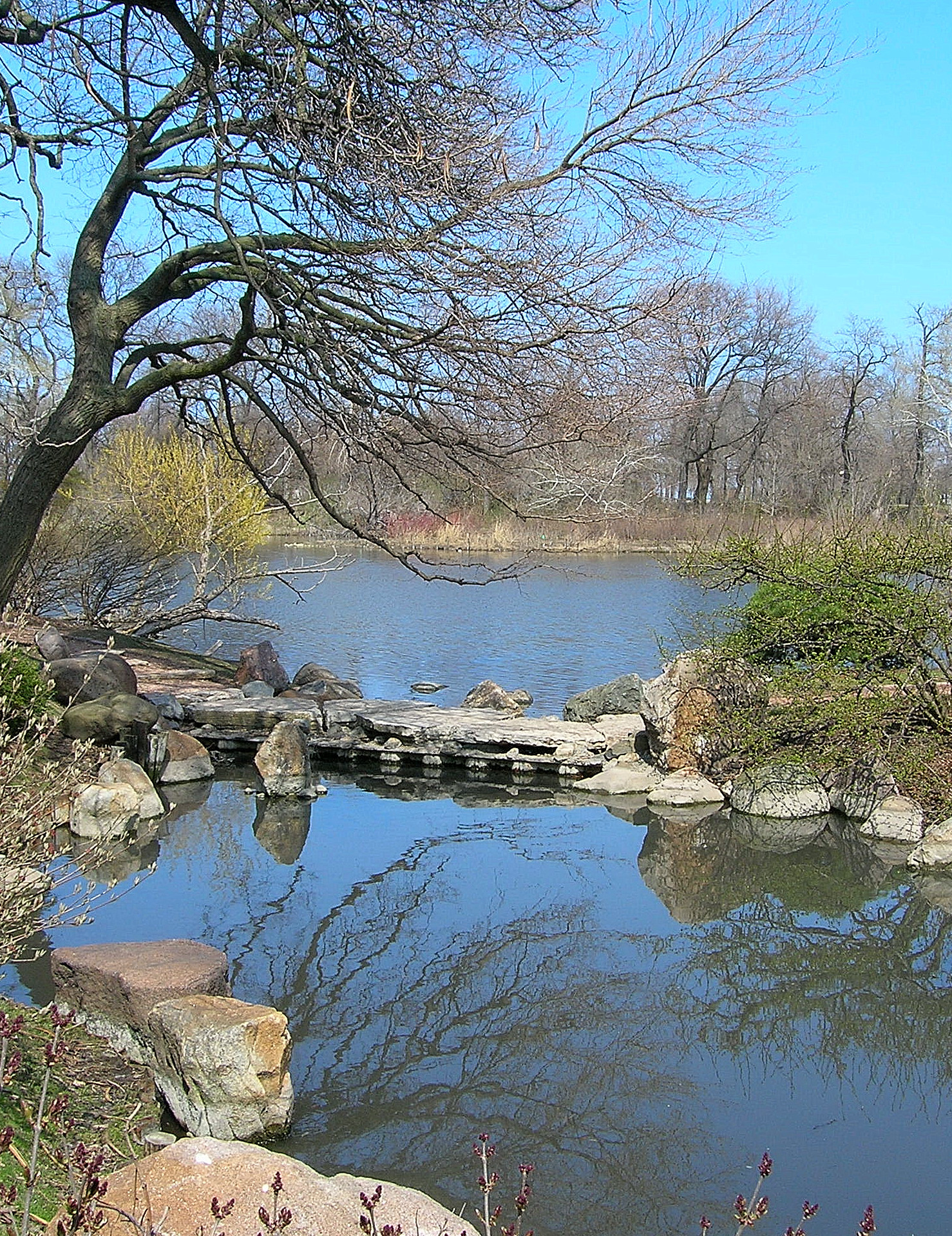
Osaka Japanese Garden in Jackson Park

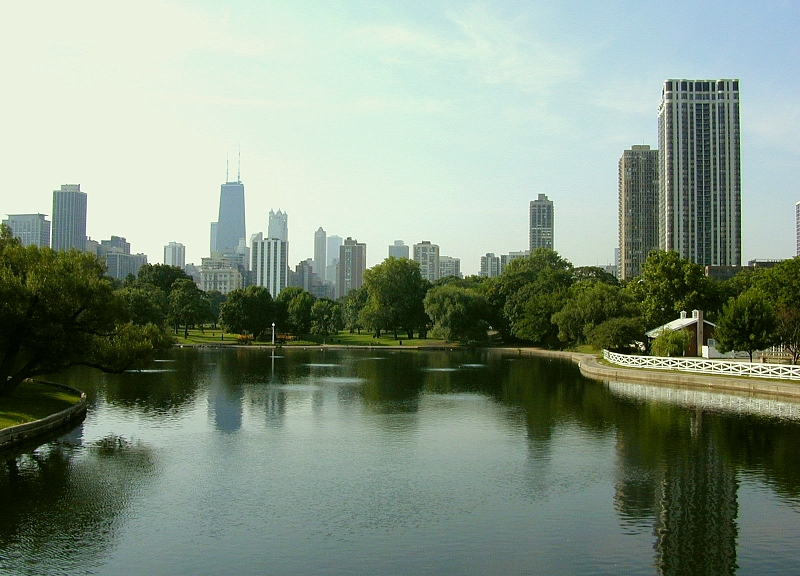
Lincoln Park Zoo

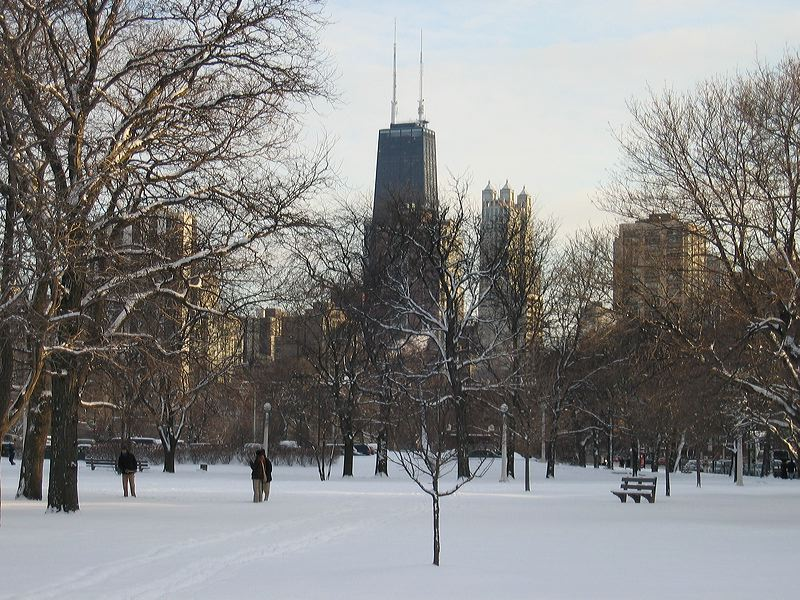
Lincoln Park in winter

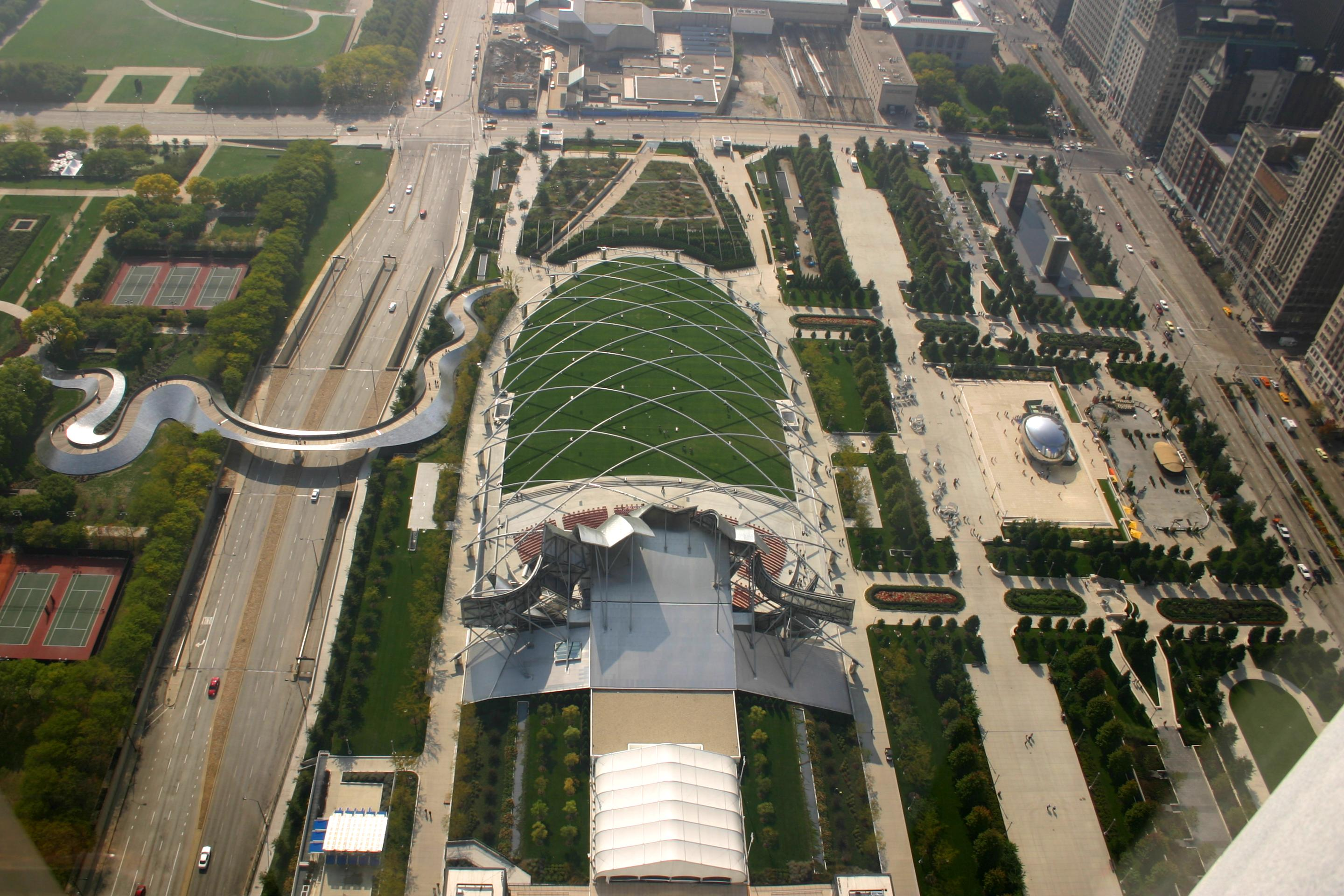
Millennium Park

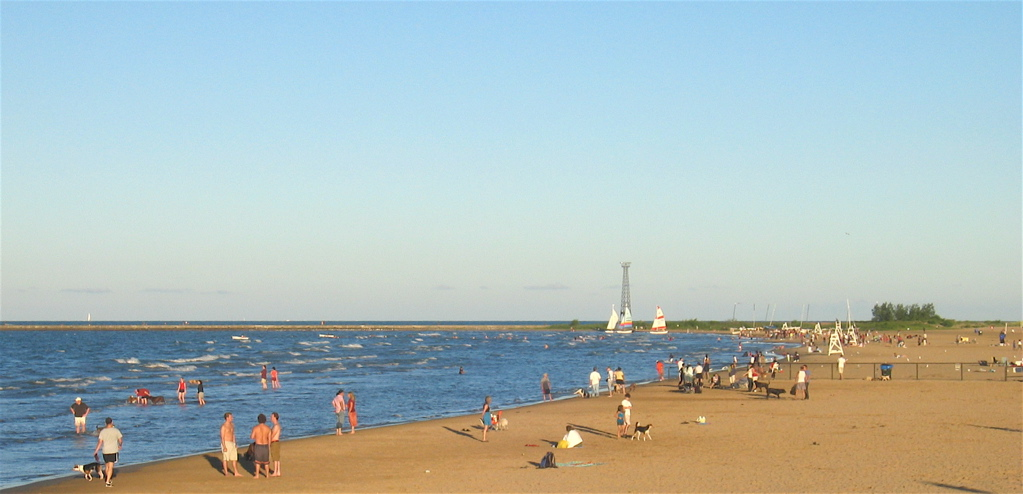
Montrose Beach

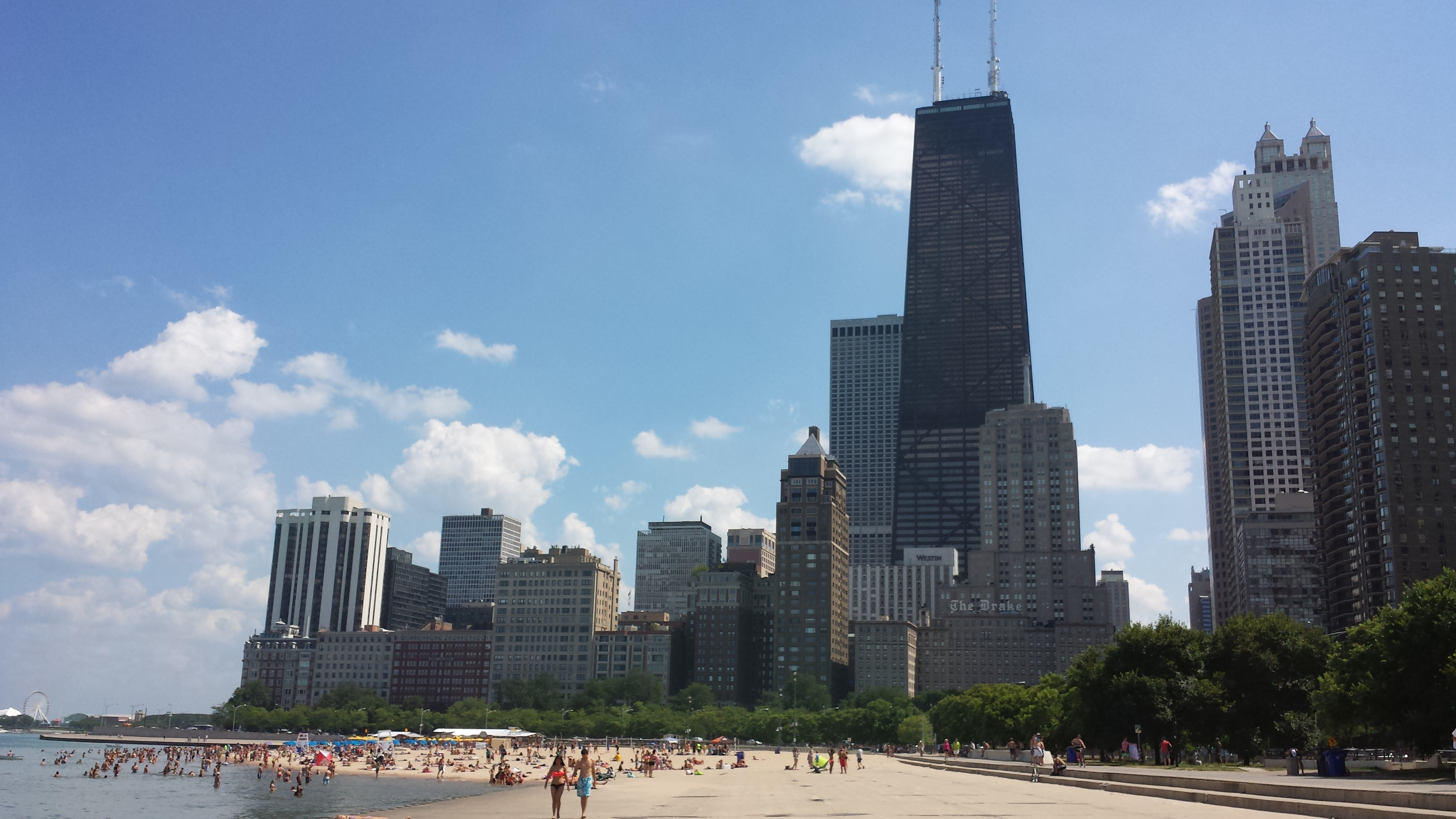
Oak Street Beach

== See also ==
- Friends of the Parks
- Parkways Foundation
- List of parks in Chicago
