= Meigs Field =

Chicago airport (1948–2003)

Merrill C. Meigs Field Airport
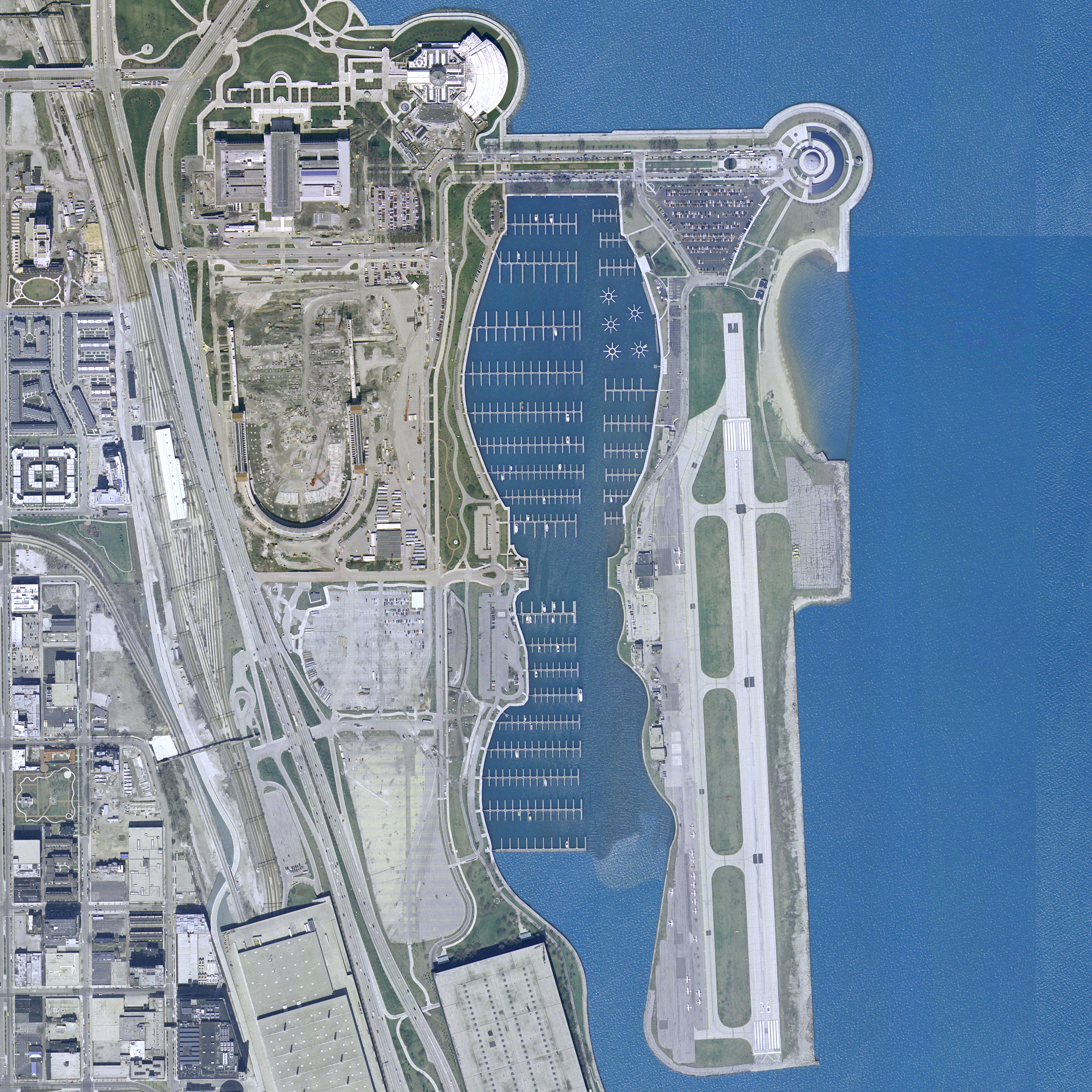
- Aerial view of Meigs Field Airport alongside Burnham Harbor in 2002, a year before its demolition
- IATA: none; ICAO: ~~KCGX~~; FAA LID: ~~CGX~~

Summary
- Airport type: Public
- Location: Chicago, Illinois
- Opened: December 10, 1948
- Closed: March 30, 2003
- Coordinates: 41°51′36″N 087°36′31″W

Map
- Interactive map of Merrill C. Meigs Field Airport

Merrill C. Meigs Field Airport (pronounced /mɛgz/, formerly ICAO: KCGX, FAA LID: CGX) was a single-runway airport in Chicago, Illinois. Named for newspaper publisher and aviation enthusiast Merrill C. Meigs, it was located on Northerly Island, an artificial peninsula in Lake Michigan, and was operational from 1948 to 2003.

Constructed to accommodate demand for general aviation following World War II, Meigs Field also served regional commercial air travel. With its proximity to downtown Chicago, it quickly became the busiest single-strip airport in the United States, adding an air traffic tower in 1952, and a terminal in 1961. It became widely familiar when it was featured as the default airport in early versions of the Microsoft Flight Simulator software.

In 2003, mayor Richard M. Daley, seeking to repurpose the land as a park, forced Meigs Field's abrupt closure by ordering the overnight destruction of its runway.

== History ==
=== Construction ===
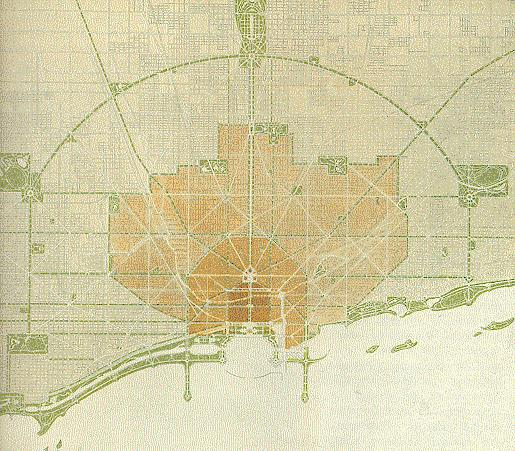
Burnham's Plan of Chicago (1909). North is to the right.

Northerly Island, owned by the Chicago Park District, is the only lakefront structure to be built based on Daniel Burnham's 1909 Plan of Chicago, which had no provision for air service. The island was to be populated by trees and grass for the public enjoyment by all. Northerly Island was also the site of the Century of Progress (1933–34) in Chicago. Chicago's first airplane flight took place in 1910 in Grant Park, adjacent to Northerly Island, with an international aeronautical exhibition at the same location in 1911. Regular air mail service to Grant Park began in 1918. Nonetheless, Grant Park was unsuitable for the city's growing aviation needs.

Burnham died in 1912. By 1916, Edward H. Bennett, co-author of the Plan of Chicago, wrote that a lakefront location would be most suitable for an airport serving the central business district. In 1920, Chicagoans approved a bond referendum to pay for landfill construction of the peninsula, which began in 1922. That same year, mayor William Hale Thompson recommended locating the downtown airport there. The Chicago South Park Commission voted in agreement a few years later. In 1928, the Chicago Association of Commerce, representing the business community, also advocated for the lakefront airport.

The Great Depression put numerous civic plans on hold, including the airport. Construction continued on the peninsula itself, with the 1933 World's Fair occupying the just-completed peninsula. The Chicago City Council and Illinois State Legislature passed resolutions to create the airport in the 1930s, but both the poor economy and World War II intervened.

=== Operations ===
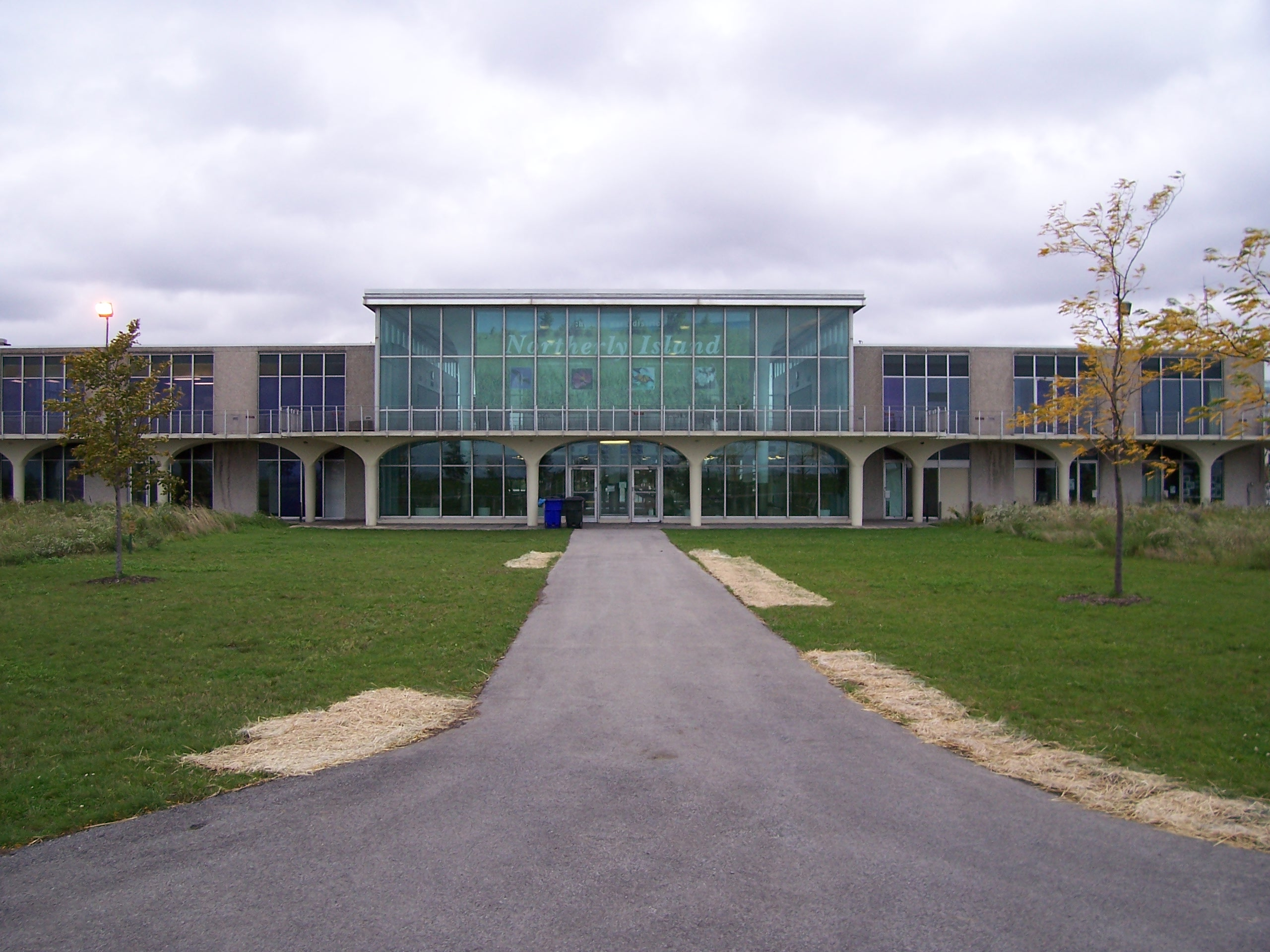
Meigs Field Airport terminal building

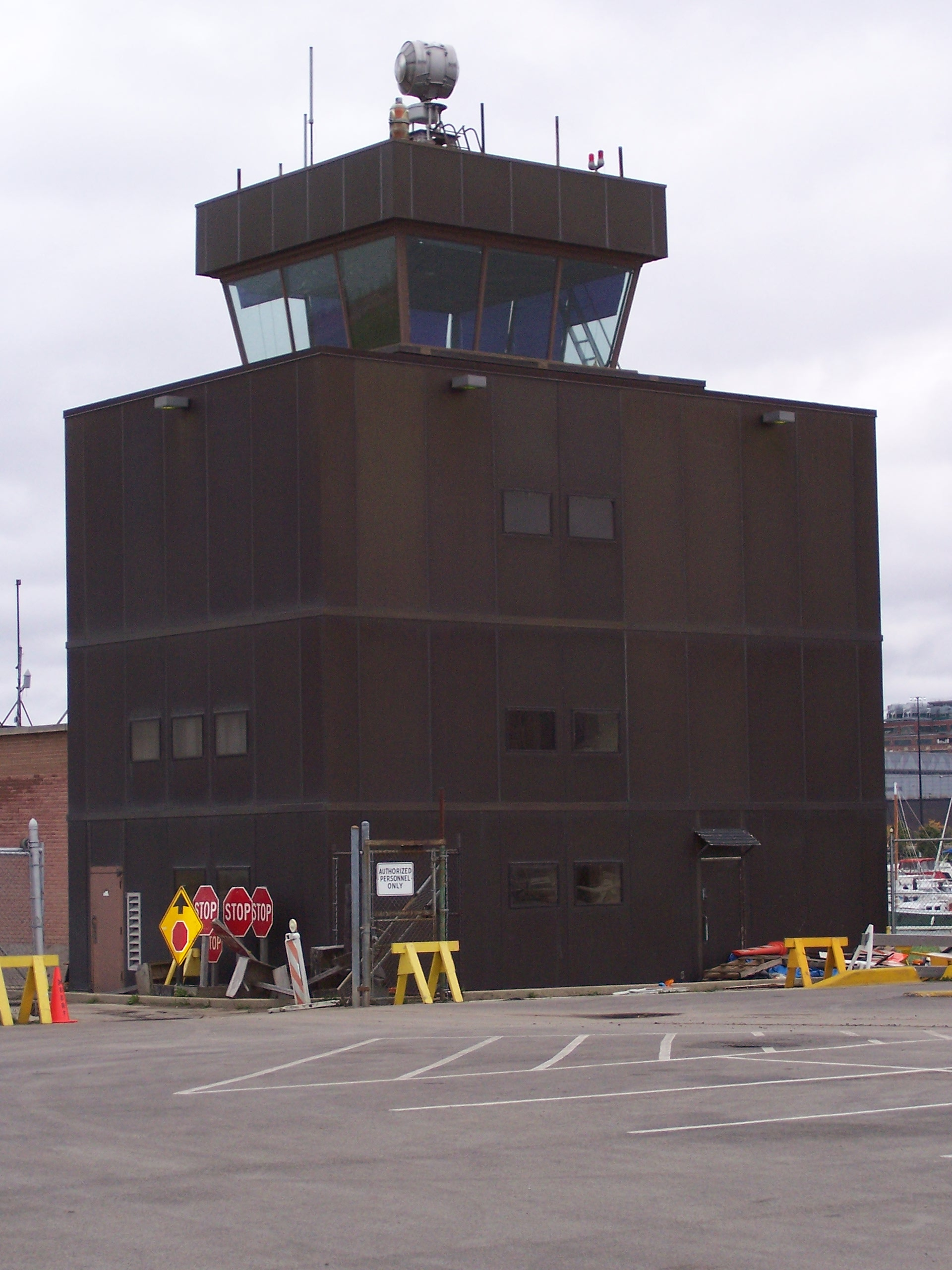
Meigs Field Airport air traffic control tower

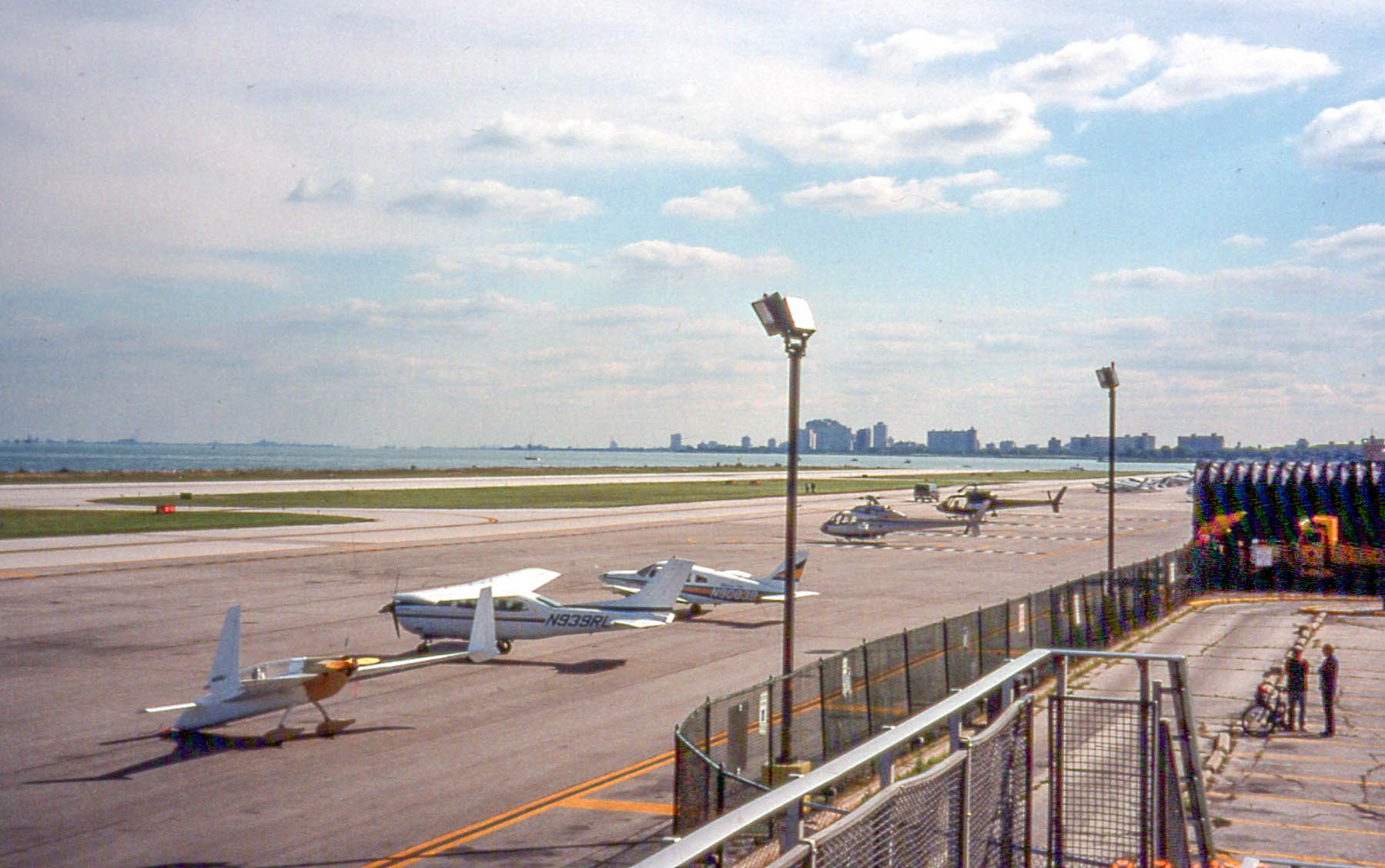
Meigs Field in 1997

In 1946, almost immediately after World War II, airport construction began. That same year, the Illinois state legislature deeded 24 acres (9.7 ha) of adjacent lake bottom to Chicago for additional landfill, in order to make the property large enough for a suitable runway. Aviation technology had advanced rapidly during World War II. The airport opened on December 10, 1948, in a grand ceremony.

On June 30, 1950, the airport was officially renamed Merrill C. Meigs Field, after Merrill C. Meigs, publisher of the Chicago Herald and Examiner and an aviation advocate. Various improvements took place over the years, including the 1952 opening of an air traffic control tower, the 1961 opening of a new terminal building (dedicated by then-mayor Richard J. Daley), runway lengthening, and the late 1990s charting of two FAA instrument approaches allowing landings in poor weather conditions. By the 1970s, Meigs Field became a critical facility for aeromedical transport of patients and transplant organs to downtown hospitals as medical transportation technology modernized. Corporate aircraft also used the airfield, including Cessna Citation and Dassault Falcon 10 business jets, and Beechcraft King Air and Grumman Gulfstream I business propjets.

The Main Terminal Building was operated by the Chicago Department of Aviation, and contained waiting areas, as well as office and counter space. The runway at Meigs Field was nearly 3,900 by 150 ft (1,189 by 46 m). In addition, there were four public helicopter pads at the south end of the runway, near McCormick Place. The north end of the runway was near the Adler Planetarium.

Meigs Field also provided commuter airline service to the public, peaking in the late 1980s as mayor Richard M. Daley took office. During the mid-1950s, Illini Airlines was operating scheduled passenger service between the airport and Freeport, Illinois, Madison, Wisconsin, Rockford, Illinois, and Sterling, Illinois, with de Havilland Dove and Piper Navajo twin engine prop aircraft. From the 1960s to early 1990s, typical intrastate destinations were Springfield and Carbondale, Illinois. Small airliners such as Beechcraft Model 99, Beechcraft 1900C, de Havilland Canada DHC-6 Twin Otter and Fairchild Swearingen Metro III turboprops, as well as Piper PA-31 Navajo prop aircraft, were operated on a scheduled basis into the airport. In 1968, Gopher Airlines was operating nonstop service between the airport and Minneapolis/St. Paul with Beechcraft 99 turboprops. In the mid- and late 1970s, Air Illinois operated 44-passenger seat Hawker Siddeley HS 748 turboprops into Meigs. The HS 748 was the largest aircraft to use Meigs on a regular basis for scheduled passenger airline operations. Ozark Air Lines, a large local service airline in the midwest that primarily operated McDonnell Douglas DC-9 jets and Fairchild Hiller FH-227B propjets at the time, served the airport during the early 1970s, with DHC-6 Twin Otter turboprops with up to eight round trip nonstop flights a day between Meigs and Springfield. Other commuter air carriers serving Meigs Field in 1975 included Midwest Commuter Airways, with nonstop flights to Indianapolis and South Bend, and Skystream Airlines with nonstops to Detroit City Airport with both small airlines operating Beechcraft 99 commuter turboprops.

Scheduled passenger helicopter airline service was also available between Meigs Field and Chicago O'Hare Airport and Chicago Midway Airport at different times over the years. From the late 1950s to late 1960s, Chicago Helicopter Airways operated 12-seat Sikorsky S-58C helicopters with frequent flights to both O'Hare and Midway.

Numerous VIPs used the airport in order to maintain security and also to avoid inconveniencing the Chicago traveling public, including President John F. Kennedy. In a common pattern, Air Force One would land at a larger area airport, and the President would then take the Marine One helicopter to Meigs Field to avoid the complications of a Secret Service escort via Chicago's expressways.

On October 15, 1992, a Boeing 727-100 jetliner donated from United Airlines to the Chicago Museum of Science and Industry made its final landing at Meigs, on its way to be transported to the museum to become an exhibit. This was notable because Meigs' 3,900-foot (1,200 m) runway was considerably shorter than other airfields the aircraft normally used. Still, the lightly loaded jet did not require all of the runway. The 727 was then barged off the airport, prepared for exhibit and further barged to the museum.

Starting in the early 1990s, the Chicago-area Tuskegee Airmen, Inc., provided free airplane rides every month and aviation education to Chicago youth at Meigs Field. Thousands of children took their first airplane rides there until 2003.

=== Historical airline service ===
The following are the main air carriers that operated scheduled passenger service from Meigs Field to Springfield, IL:

- 1970–1983: Air Illinois flew the 44-seat Hawker Siddeley HS 748 turboprop, the largest aircraft regularly scheduled into Meigs.
- 1984–1985: Mississippi Valley Airlines
- 1984–1991: Britt Airways (began doing business as Continental Express in 1986, operating code share service for Continental Airlines).
- 1988–1995: Trans States Airlines (doing business as Trans World Express, operating code share service for TWA).
- 1991–2001: Great Lakes Airlines (began doing business as United Express in 1992, operating code share service for United Airlines).

Smaller carriers that briefly provided service from Meigs to other cities include:

- Chicago Helicopter Airways
- Gopher Airlines
- Hub Airlines
- Illini Airlines
- Midwest Commuter Airways
- Ozark Air Lines
- Skystream Airlines

According to the Official Airline Guide (OAG) from February 1, 1976, two airlines were serving Meigs Field at this time: Air Illinois and Skystream Airlines. Air Illinois was operating the 44-seat HS-748 turboprop into the airport at this time with nonstop flights to Springfield, Illinois, and continuing no change of plane service to Alton and Carbondale, Illinois. Skystream Airlines was operating Beechcraft 99 commuter turboprops on a nonstop and direct flights to Detroit Metro Airport, Indianapolis, Indiana, and South Bend, Indiana.

According to the OAG from September 15, 1994, three air carriers were serving Meigs Field with scheduled passenger flights: Great Lakes Aviation operating as United Express on behalf of United Airlines, Trans States Airlines flying as Trans World Express on behalf of Trans World Airlines (TWA). Great Lakes was operating Beechcraft 1900C turboprops on its nonstop service to Lansing, Michigan, and Springfield and was also flying one stop direct service to Quincy, IL. Trans States served Springfield, IL nonstop with Swearingen Metro III propjets.

=== Demolition and closure ===
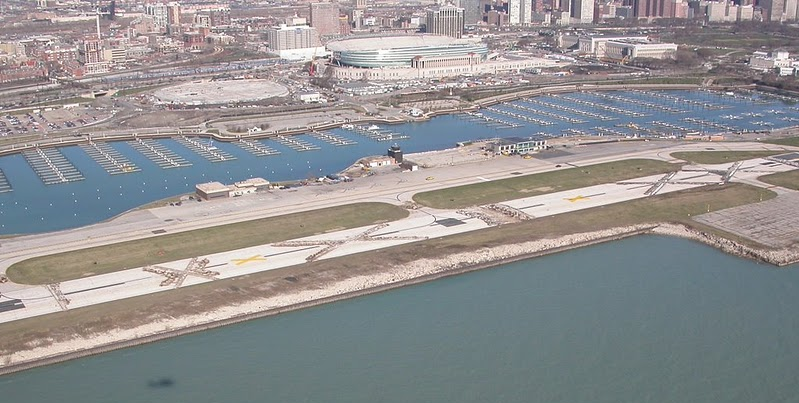
Meigs Field Runway a few days after destruction ordered by Mayor Daley. The large X marks were cut into the runway by bulldozers to prevent aircraft from taking off or landing.

In 1994, then-Chicago mayor Richard M. Daley announced plans to close the airport and build a park in its place. Northerly Island, where the airport was located, was owned by the Chicago Park District, which refused to renew the airport lease in 1996. Due to the expiration of the lease, the city briefly closed the airport from October 1996 until February 1997, when pressure from the state legislature persuaded them to reopen the airport.

On the night of March 30, 2003, Daley ordered city crews to make the runway unusable by bulldozing large "X"-shaped gouges into the runway surface in the middle of the night. Daley did not provide public notice of his intent to close the airport. This resulted in several aircraft being stranded on the ground at the airport; these were later allowed to depart from Meigs' 3,000-foot (910 m) taxiway.

Daley stated during a news conference on March 31, "To do this any other way would have been needlessly contentious." Daley defended his actions by claiming it would save the city of Chicago the effort of further court battles before the airport could close. He also claimed the closure was due to safety concerns, particularly the post-9/11 risk of terrorist-controlled aircraft attacking the downtown waterfront near Meigs Field.

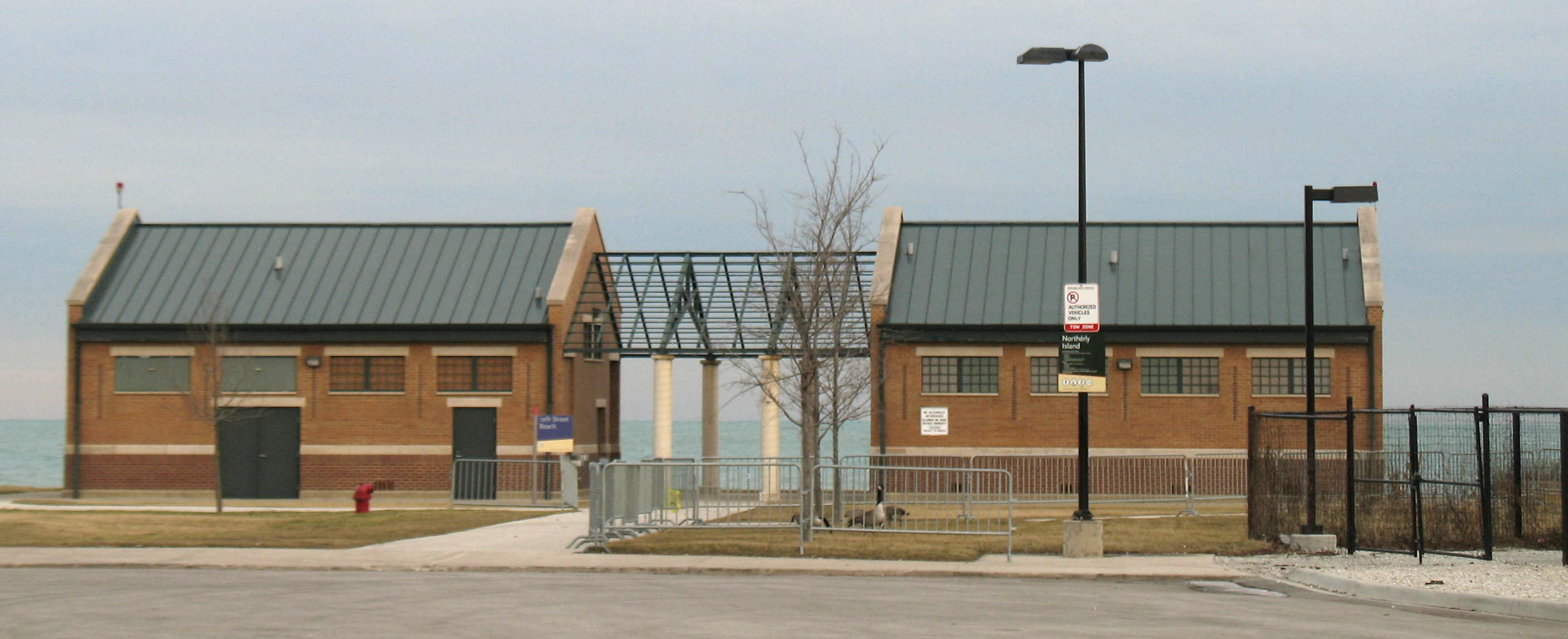
12th Street Beach House

According to Chicago Tribune columnist Eric Zorn, "The signature act of Richard Daley's 22 years in office was the midnight bulldozing of Meigs Field." Tribune columnist John Kass wrote of Daley that "he ruined Meigs because he wanted to, because he could."

While aviation interests and commentators decried the move, supporters of the park believed it was in the city's best interest for the land to be a park. For example, the Lake Michigan Federation (later the Alliance for the Great Lakes) released an urban wilderness plan for the site in February 2001. Instead of calling it "Northerly Island" (a reference to the northernmost landmass of four others that were never built under the 1909 Plan of Chicago), "Sanctuary Point" would allow access for many more people than the fairly exclusive use as an airstrip.

On July 28, 2003, an aircraft flying from Maine to the Experimental Aircraft Association Annual Convention in Oshkosh, Wisconsin, made an emergency landing on the grass next to the demolished Meigs Field runway. Daley accused the pilot of intentionally landing in order to "embarrass" him, despite the FAA's statement that the pilot "did the correct thing" in landing the plane at Meigs.

Interest groups, led by the Friends of Meigs Field, attempted to use the courts to reopen the site over the following months. However, since the airport was owned by the city of Chicago and had paid back its federal aviation grants, the courts ruled that the city was allowed to close the field. The FAA fined Chicago $33,000 for closing an airport with a charted instrument approach without giving the required 30-day notice. This was the maximum fine the law allowed at the time. In the aftermath, the "Meigs Legacy provision" was passed into law, increasing the maximum fine per day from $1,100 to $10,000. On September 17, 2006, the city dropped all legal appeals and agreed to pay the $33,000 fine, as well as repay $1 million in FAA Airport Improvement Program funds that it used to demolish the airfield and build Northerly Island Park.

== Northerly Island ==
Charter One Pavilion sign, 2007

By August 2003, construction crews had finished the demolition of Meigs Field. Northerly Island is now a park that features prairie grasses, strolling paths and a giant pond. In 2005, the 7,500 seat Huntington Bank Pavilion, which hosts music concerts in the summer, opened on the site. The island also has a modest beach named 12th Street Beach.

Other Chicagoans had a different vision for the lakefront area. After the 2003 closure, the Friends of Meigs Field introduced a new plan, "Parks and Planes", which promoted the idea of an aviation museum, small operating runway, and park land on the property. This plan suggested that Chicago could qualify for federal funds earmarked for airport property acquisition to purchase many more acres of parkland in Chicago's neighborhoods and to improve the Chicago Park District's maintenance budget.
