= Merrill C. Meigs =

American publisher (1883–1968)

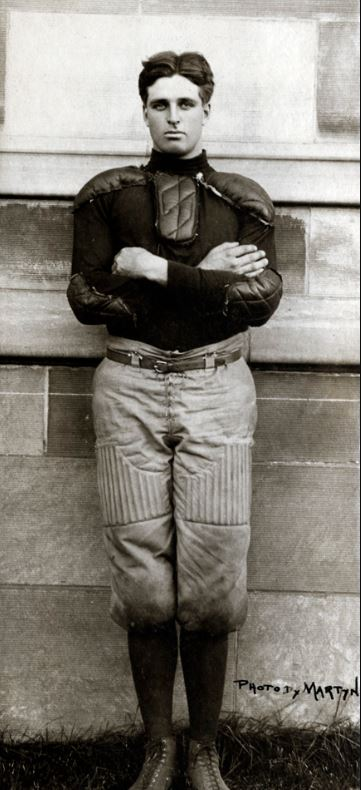
- Meigs, University of Chicago, 1905
- Born: Merrill Church Meigs; November 25, 1883; Poweshiek County, Iowa, U.S.
- Died: January 26, 1968 (aged 84); Palm Beach County, Florida, U.S.
- Resting place: Mount Hope Cemetery
- Occupation(s): Publisher, pilot, journalist
- Spouses: Ethel May Harmon (m. 1912, death) Blanche Noe McKeever (m. 1960)
- Children: Harmon Meigs; Merrill Church Meigs, Jr.; Stanford Meigs

Merrill Church Meigs /mɛɡz/ (November 25, 1883 – January 26, 1968) was the publisher of the Chicago Herald and Examiner in the 1920s. Inspired to become a pilot by Charles Lindbergh's solo flight across the Atlantic Ocean, he became a booster of Chicago as a world center of aviation. He gave flying lessons to President Harry S. Truman.

== Life and career ==
Meigs was born in Poweshiek County, Iowa, the son of Church Paddleford Meigs and Julianna S. (Burrell) Meigs. He grew up on a farm near Malcom, Iowa, where he was more interested in the mechanical devices used to raise crops than actually farming. In 1901, he took a job as a salesman for the J.I. Case Threshing Machine Company in Racine, Wisconsin. Within a year, he was in charge of the company's sales for South America. Despite not having graduated from high school, Meigs was allowed to enroll at the University of Chicago, where he played football under Amos Alonzo Stagg and also played baseball and water polo. He was the starting left guard of the 1905 University of Chicago national championship team . While at the college, he would also be the campus correspondent for the Chicago Herald and Examiner, of which he would become the executive later in his life. During World War II, Meigs served on the Office of Production Management as the aircraft expert.

In time Meigs would become a senior vice president of the Hearst Corporation, publisher of the old Chicago American newspaper as well as becoming the head of the Chicago Aero Commission. Meigs insisted that in addition to Midway Airport (then called Municipal Airport) and O'Hare Field (then called Orchard-Douglas), the city needed an airfield within ten minutes of the Loop. It opened in December 1948 and was renamed Meigs Field in his honor the following year. Fifty-five years after the renaming, Meigs Field was demolished by order of then-Chicago mayor Richard M. Daley.

Meigs retired in 1962 and became a consultant to the newspaper industry. He died at age 84.

== Sources ==
- Meigs - The Man Who Loved to Fly, Reprinted from Friends of Meigs Field, Chicago, IL. Accessed on Meigs Family History and Genealogy website, December 16, 2007
