= John Henry Rauch =

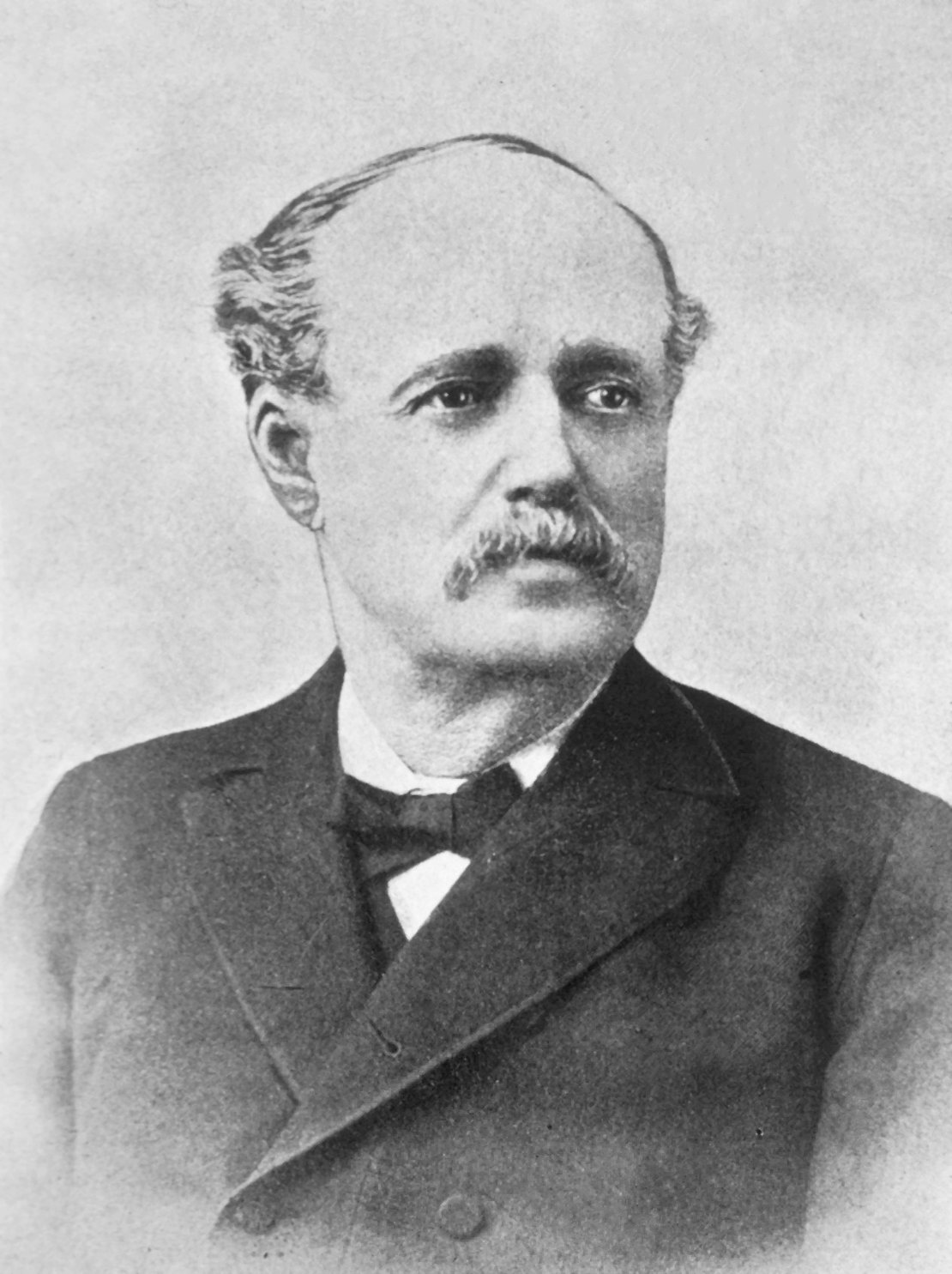
John Henry Rauch

John Henry Rauch (September 4, 1828 – March 24, 1894) was an American sanitarian. He brought attention to public health problems posed by cemeteries in large cities and handled the public health emergencies posed by the Chicago fire of 1871. He was the founding president of the Illinois State Board of Health.

== Biography ==
John Henry Rauch was born in Lebanon, Pennsylvania on September 4, 1828. He graduated in medicine from the University of Pennsylvania and settled in Burlington, Iowa. In 1850, on the organization of the Iowa State Medical Society, he was appointed to report on the "Medical and Economic Botany of Iowa", and this report was afterward published (1851). He was an active member of the Iowa Historical and Geological Institute, and made a collection of material – especially ichthyologic – from the upper Mississippi and Missouri rivers for Louis Agassiz, a description of which was published in Silliman's Journal (1855).

In 1857, he was appointed professor of materia medica and medical botany in Rush Medical College, Chicago, which chair he filled for the next three years. In 1859, he was one of the organizers of the Chicago College of Pharmacy and filled its chair of materia medica and medical botany.

During the Civil War, he served as assistant medical director of the Army of Virginia, and then in Louisiana, until 1864. At the close of the war he was brevetted lieutenant-colonel.

On his return to Chicago, Dr. Rauch published a pamphlet on "Intramural Interments in Populous Cities, and Their Influence Upon Health and Epidemics" (Chicago, 1866). He aided in reorganizing the health service of the city, and in 1867 was appointed member of the newly created board of health and sanitary superintendent, which office he filled until 1873. During his incumbency the great fire of 1871 occurred, and the task of organizing and enforcing the sanitary measures for the welfare of 112,000 houseless men, women, and children was suddenly thrown upon his department.

In 1876 he was elected president of the American Public Health Association, and delivered the annual address on the "Sanitary Problems of Chicago" at the 1877 meeting of the association. In 1877, when the Illinois State Board of Health was created, Rauch was appointed one of its members, and elected its first president. He was elected secretary, to which office he had been re-elected annually for years.

In 1878–79 the yellow fever epidemics in the southern United States engaged his attention, resulting in the formation of the Sanitary Council of the Mississippi Valley and the establishment of the River Inspection Service of the National Board of Health, inaugurated by Rauch in 1879. His investigations on the relation of smallpox to foreign immigration are embodied in an address before the National conference of state boards of health at St. Louis, October 13, 1884, entitled "Practical Recommendations for the Exclusion and Prevention of Asiatic Cholera in North America" (Springfield, 1884). In 1887 he published the preliminary results of his investigations into the character of the water-supplies of Illinois.

Rauch was a member of many scientific bodies and the author of monographs, chiefly in the domain of sanitary science and preventive medicine. His chief work as a writer is embodied in the reports of the Illinois State Board of Health in eight volumes. He was a recognized authority on medical education.

He died at his brother's home in Lebanon, Pennsylvania on March 24, 1894.
