= Chicago Helicopter Airways =

Helicopter airline (1956–1974)

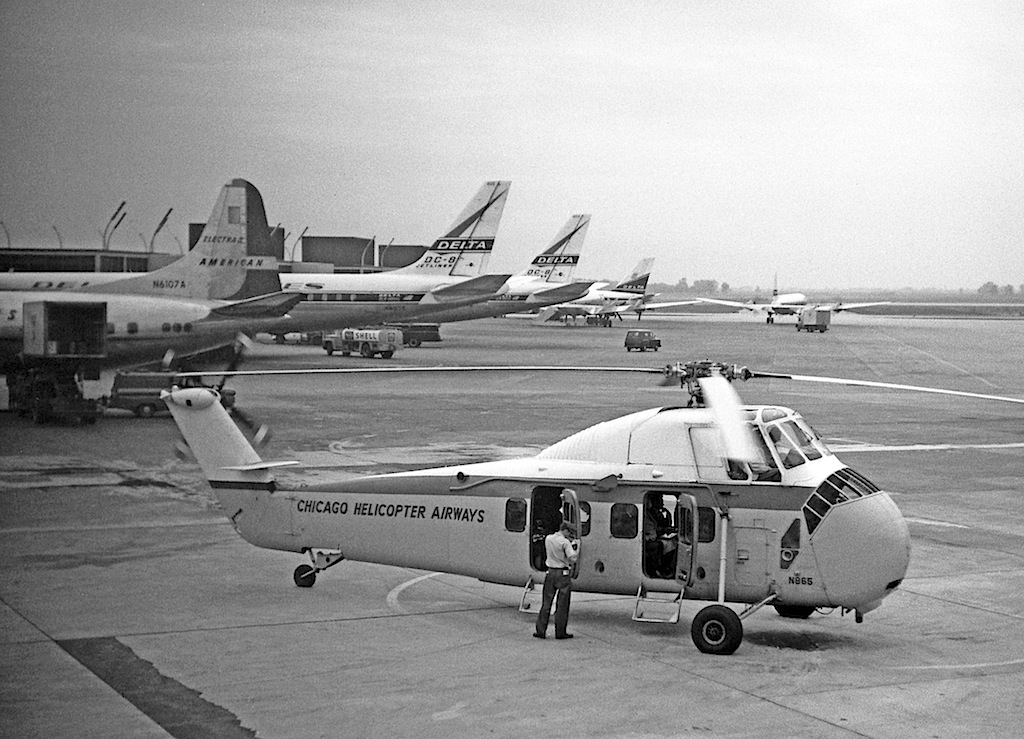
S-58C Chicago O'Hare 1963

Chicago Helicopter Airways was a short-hop commuter service that ran between O'Hare International Airport, Chicago Midway International Airport, Meigs Field, Winnetka, Illinois, and Gary, Indiana from November 12, 1956 (68 years ago) to 1974 (51 years ago). Incorporated on 13 November 1926 as Helicopter Air Service, mail services were provided to 54 post offices, three times per day. It started carrying passengers in 1956, when a government program offered grants to promote helicopter commuting. In 1960 126 flights carried 6,000 passengers every day, primarily using Sikorsky S-58C helicopters, a civilian version of the Sikorsky H-34. With the disaster of Chicago Helicopter Airways Flight 698, business quickly dropped off so that by 1963 it was down to 3,000 passengers per day. Grant money ran out in 1966. CHA made an unsuccessful try at a limited-service comeback in 1969 and the company closed down in 1974.
