= Chicago Helicopter Airways Flight 698 =

1960 helicopter crash in Illinois, US

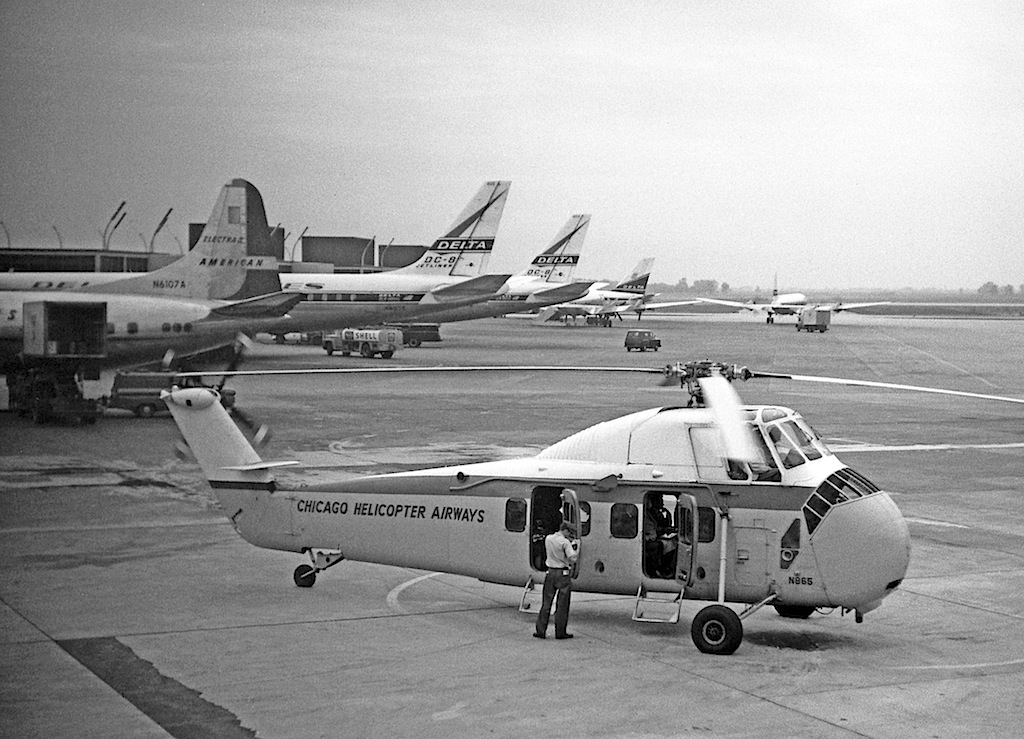
- A Sikorsky S-58 similar to the accident aircraft

Accident
- Date: July 27, 1960
- Summary: Rotor failure
- Site: Forest Home Cemetery, Forest Park, Illinois, Chicago, United States; 41.869°N 87.831°W

Aircraft
- Aircraft type: Sikorsky S-58C
- Operator: Chicago Helicopter Airways
- Registration: N879
- Flight origin: Chicago Midway Airport, United States
- Destination: Chicago O'Hare Airport, United States
- Occupants: 13
- Passengers: 11
- Crew: 2
- Fatalities: 13
- Injuries: 0

Chicago Helicopter Airways Flight 698 was a scheduled domestic helicopter service between Chicago Midway Airport and Chicago O'Hare Airport. On 27 July 1960 it was operated by a Sikorsky S-58C helicopter which departed Chicago Midway Airport with two pilots and 11 passengers. It crashed at Forest Home Cemetery, Forest Park, Illinois killing all on board.

== Accident ==
The helicopter had arrived from Chicago O'Hare Airport at 22:15 CDT. It then departed on the return journey at 22:30 CDT in VFR weather conditions. During the flight, part of one of the main rotor blades broke away and the helicopter descended to attempt an emergency landing. The tail cone and tail rotor broke away and the helicopter spun nose-down into the ground at the Forest Home Cemetery in Forest Park and burst into flames.

== Investigation ==
The Civil Aeronautics Board determined that N879 crashed as a result of structural disintegration in flight and caused by a fatigue fracture of the main rotor blade.

== Aircraft ==
The helicopter was a Sikorsky S-58C built in 1957 and registered in the United States as N879. It was delivered to New York Airways in January 1957 it was later sold to Chicago Helicopter Airways.
