= Sikorsky H-34 =

American helicopter

Sikorsky H-34 / S-58
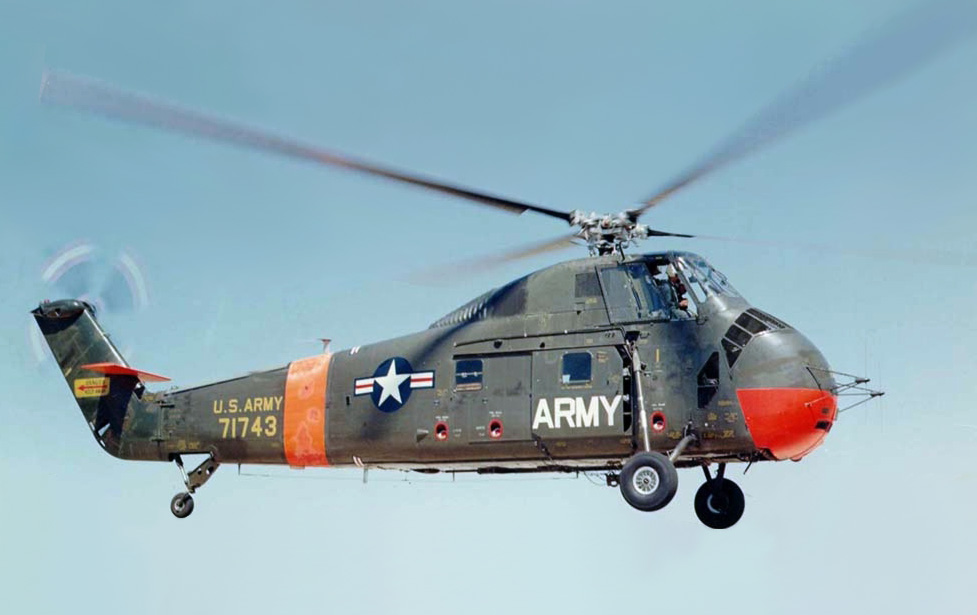
- A United States Army CH-34

General information
- Type: Helicopter
- National origin: United States
- Manufacturer: Sikorsky Aircraft
- Status: In service
- Primary users: United States Army United States Navy; United States Marine Corps
- Number built: 2,340

History
- Manufactured: 1954–1970 (Foreign production of derivatives and sub-types continued under license after the Sikorsky production ended.)
- Introduction date: 1954
- First flight: 8 March 1954
- Developed from: Sikorsky H-19 Chickasaw
- Variant: Westland Wessex

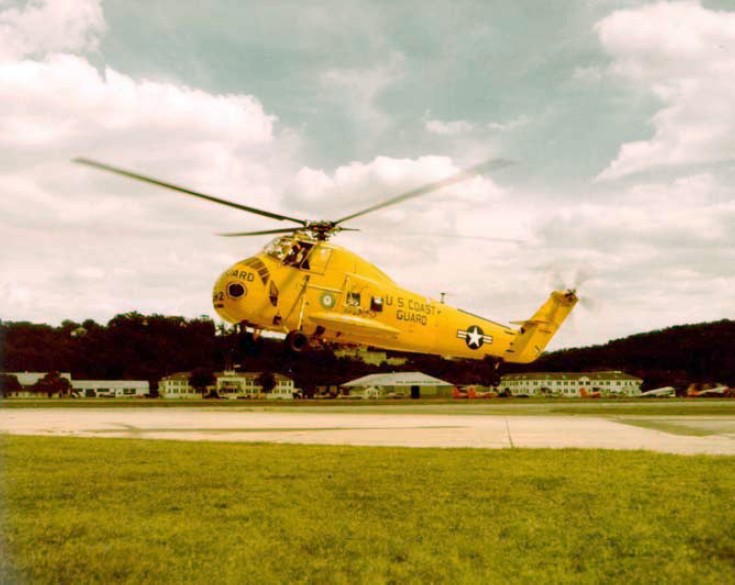
A U.S. Coast Guard HUS-1G in 1960.

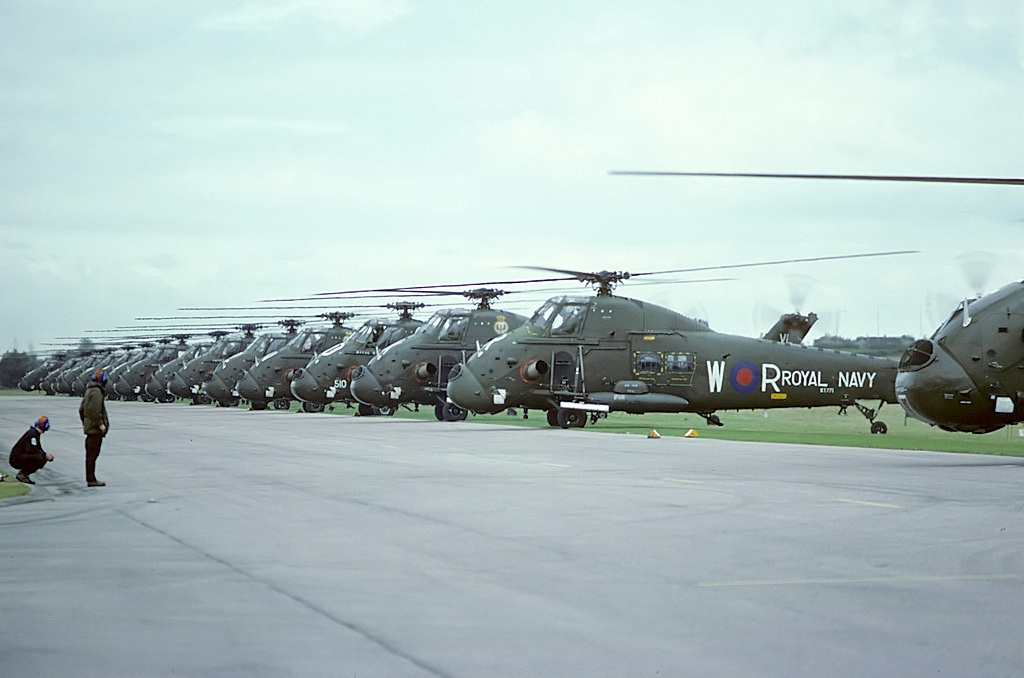
Row of Westland Wessex HU.5, 1978

The Sikorsky H-34 (company designation S-58) is an American piston-engined military utility helicopter originally designed by Sikorsky as an anti-submarine warfare (ASW) aircraft for the United States Navy. A development of the smaller Sikorsky H-19 Chickasaw (S-55), the H-34 was originally powered by a radial engine, but was later adapted to turbine power by the British licensee as the Westland Wessex and by Sikorsky as the S-58T. The H-34 was also produced under license in France by Sud Aviation.

The H-34 was one of the first successful military utility helicopters, serving on every continent with the armed forces of 25 countries. It saw combat in the Dominican Republic, Nicaragua, the Six-Day War, the Vietnam War, and the Algerian War, where the French Air Force used it to pioneer modern air assault tactics. It was the last piston-engined helicopter to be operated by the United States Marine Corps (USMC), having been replaced by turbine-powered types such as the UH-1 Huey and CH-46 Sea Knight; in the USMC, the H-34 was often called the "HUS" after its original designation in that service. A total of 2,340 H-34s were manufactured between 1953 and 1970, including the license productions in the UK and France.

Although most military forces retired the H-34 by the late 20th century, the type remains in limited civil use in transport and external cargo lift roles, and some have been restored and flown as warbirds.

== Development ==
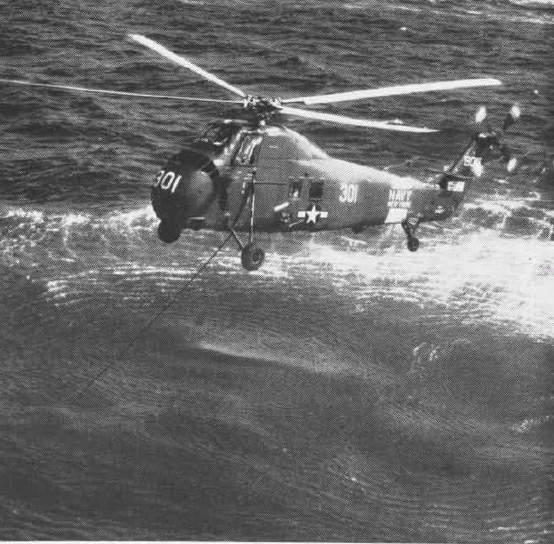
A U.S. Navy HSS-1 with dipping sonar deployed, in 1960.

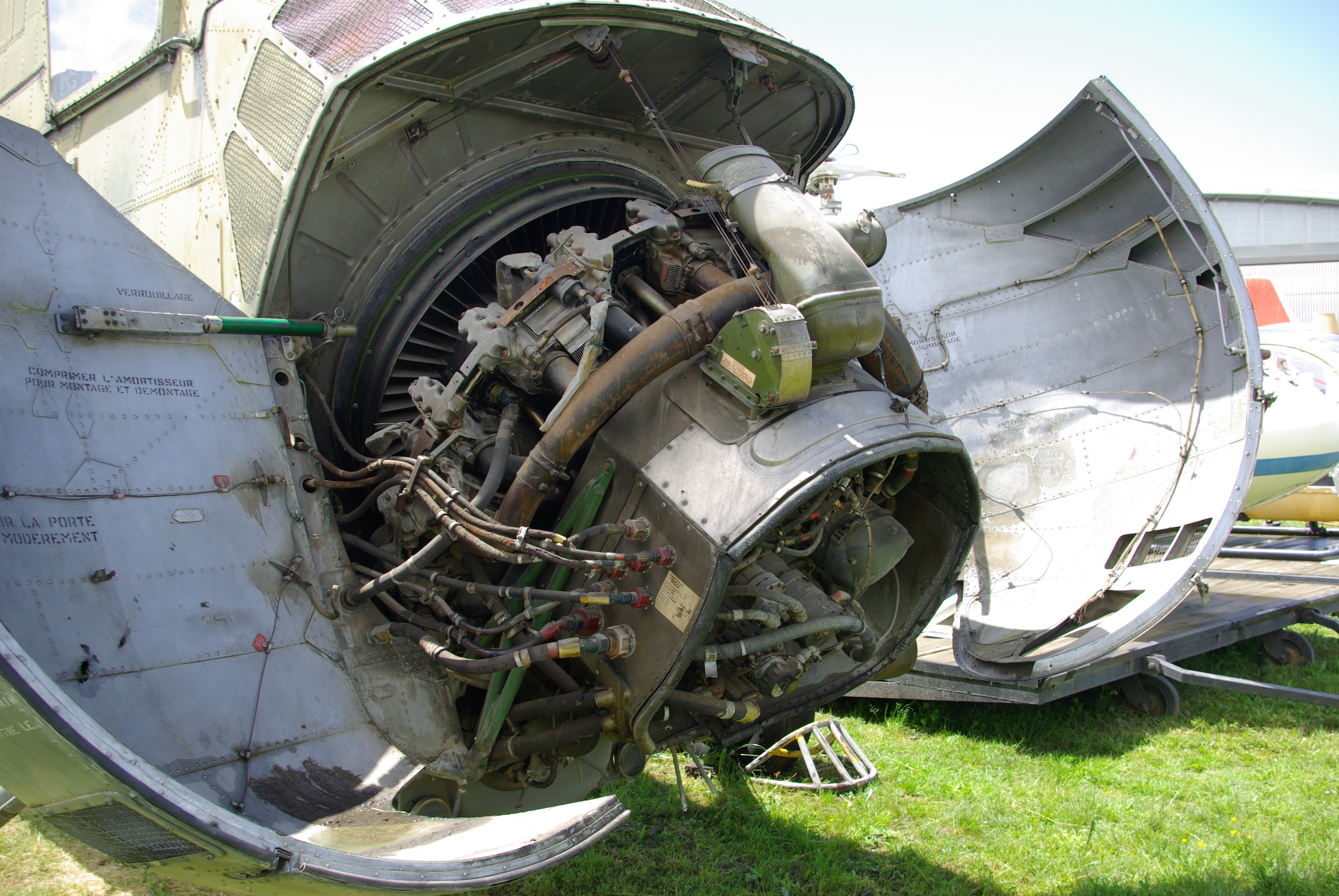
Radial engine of a H-34 under the fuselage

In the early 1950s Sikorsky developed the S-58, an improved version of the S-55, which had entered service as the H-19 with the United States. The United States Navy issued a contract in 1952 for the S-58, entering service as the HUS-1, the Army placing a contract in 1955 as the H-34, and the Marine Corp in 1957 (as the HUS-1). In 1962 these names were standardized to H-34, with additional prefixes and letters according to that U.S. designation system. Westland had already made a version of the predecessor of the S-58, the S-55 as the Westland Whirlwind, and they would go on to make a turbine powered version of the S-56 as the Westland Wessex.

The Sikorsky S-58 was developed as a lengthened and more powerful version of the Sikorsky Model S-55, or UH-19 Chickasaw, with a similar nose, but with a tail-dragger rear fuselage and landing gear, rather than the high-tail, 4-post pattern. It retained the nose-mounted radial reciprocating engine with the drive shaft passing through the cockpit placed high above the cargo compartment.

The aircraft first flew on 8 March 1954. The first production aircraft was ready in September and entered in service for the United States Navy initially designated HSS-1 Seabat (in its anti-submarine configuration) and HUS-1 Seahorse (in its utility transport configuration) under the U.S. Navy designation system for U.S. Navy, United States Marine Corps (USMC) and United States Coast Guard (USCG) aircraft. The U.S. Army and Marine Corps, respectively, ordered it in 1955 and 1957. Under the United States Army's aircraft designation system, also used by the United States Air Force, the helicopter was designated H-34. The U.S. Army also applied the name Choctaw to the helicopter. In 1962, under the new unified DoD aircraft designation system, the Seabat was redesignated SH-34, the Seahorse as the UH-34, and the Choctaw as the CH-34.

Roles included utility transport, anti-submarine warfare, search and rescue, and VIP transport. In its standard configuration, transport versions could carry 12 to 16 troops, or eight stretcher cases if utilized in the MedEvac role, while VIP transports carried significantly fewer people in much greater comfort.

A total of 135 H-34s were built in the US and assembled by Sud-Aviation in France, 166 were produced under licence in France by Sud-Aviation for the French Air Force.

The CH-34 was also built and developed under license from 1958 in the United Kingdom by Westland Aircraft as the turboshaft engined Wessex which was used by the Royal Navy and Royal Air Force. The RN Wessex was fitted out with weapons and ASW equipment for use in an antisubmarine role. The RAF used the Wessex, with turboshaft engines, as an air/sea rescue helicopter and as troop transporter. Wessexes were also exported to other countries and produced for civilian use.

== Operational history ==
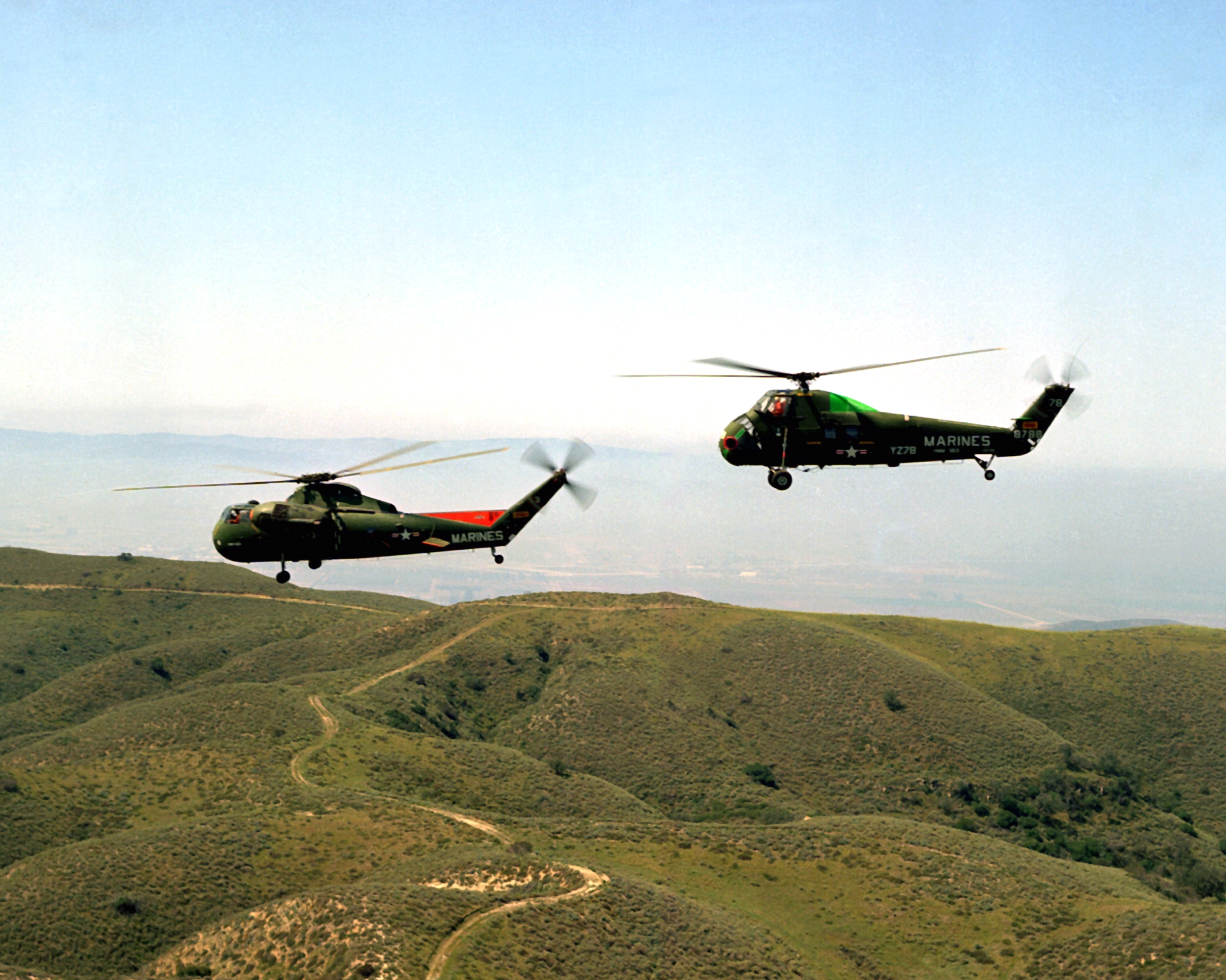
CH-37C and UH-34D of the United States Marine Corps. The H-34 was complementary to other types in US service. Nevertheless, it showed how a versatile and reliable medium helicopter could be adapted to many roles.

Entering service in the 1950s, the type served numerous roles in the late 20th century.

The type was internationally and commercially.

=== Algerian War ===
The helicopters used by the French Air Force, including the Sikorsky H-34, aggregated over 190,000 flying hours in Algeria (over 87,000 for the H-21 alone) and helped to evacuate over 20,000 French combatants from the combat area, including nearly 2,200 at night. By the time the war in Algeria had ended, eight officers and 23 non-commissioned officers had been killed.

The use of armed helicopters during the Algerian War, coupled with helicopter transports which can insert troops into enemy territory, gave birth to some of the modern tactics of airmobile warfare.

=== Vietnam War ===
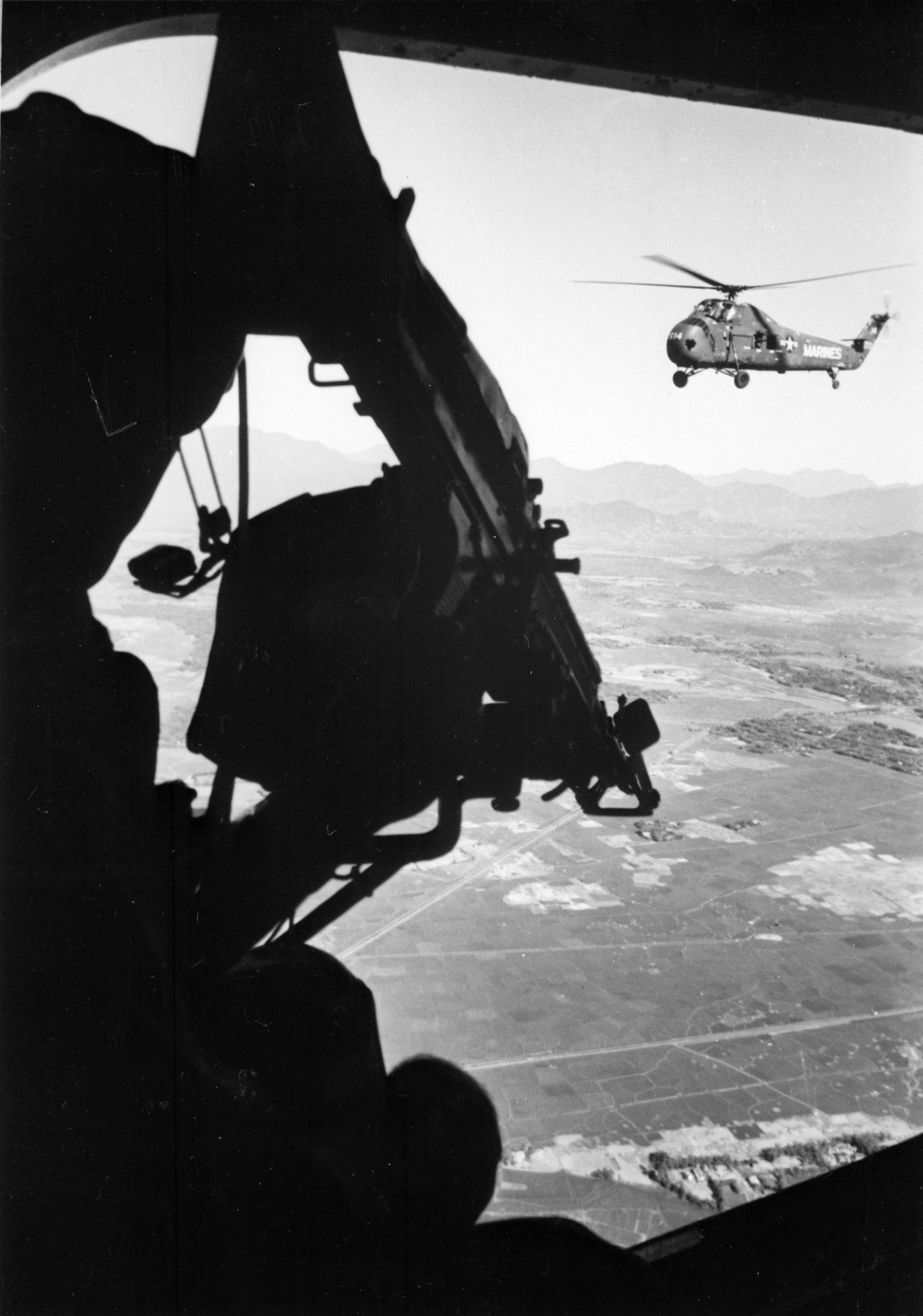
U.S. Marine Corps UH-34Ds over Mekong Delta

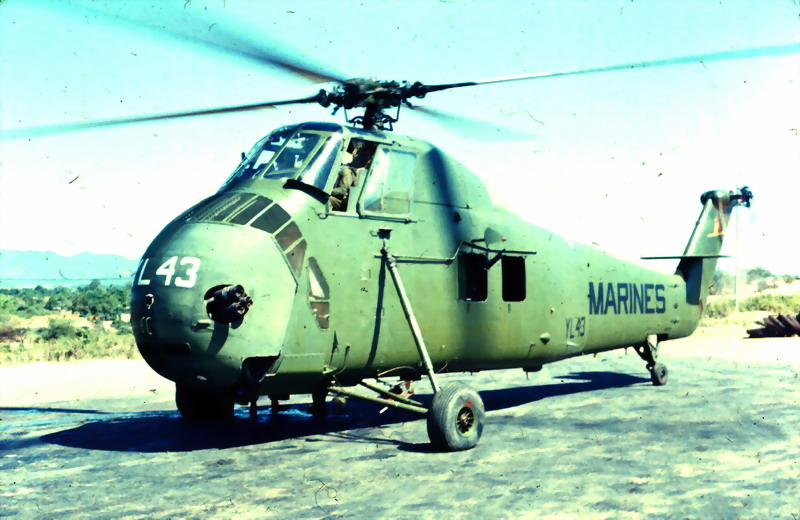
USMC helicopter in Vietnam

French evaluations on the reported ground fire vulnerabilities of the CH-34 may have influenced the U.S. Army's decision to deploy the CH-21 Shawnee to Vietnam instead of the CH-34, pending the introduction into widespread service of the Bell UH-1 Iroquois. U.S. Army H-34s did not participate in Vietnam, and did not fly in the assault helicopter role, but a quantity were supplied to the Republic of Vietnam Air Force (RVNAF). These saw little use due to a lack of spare parts and maintenance.

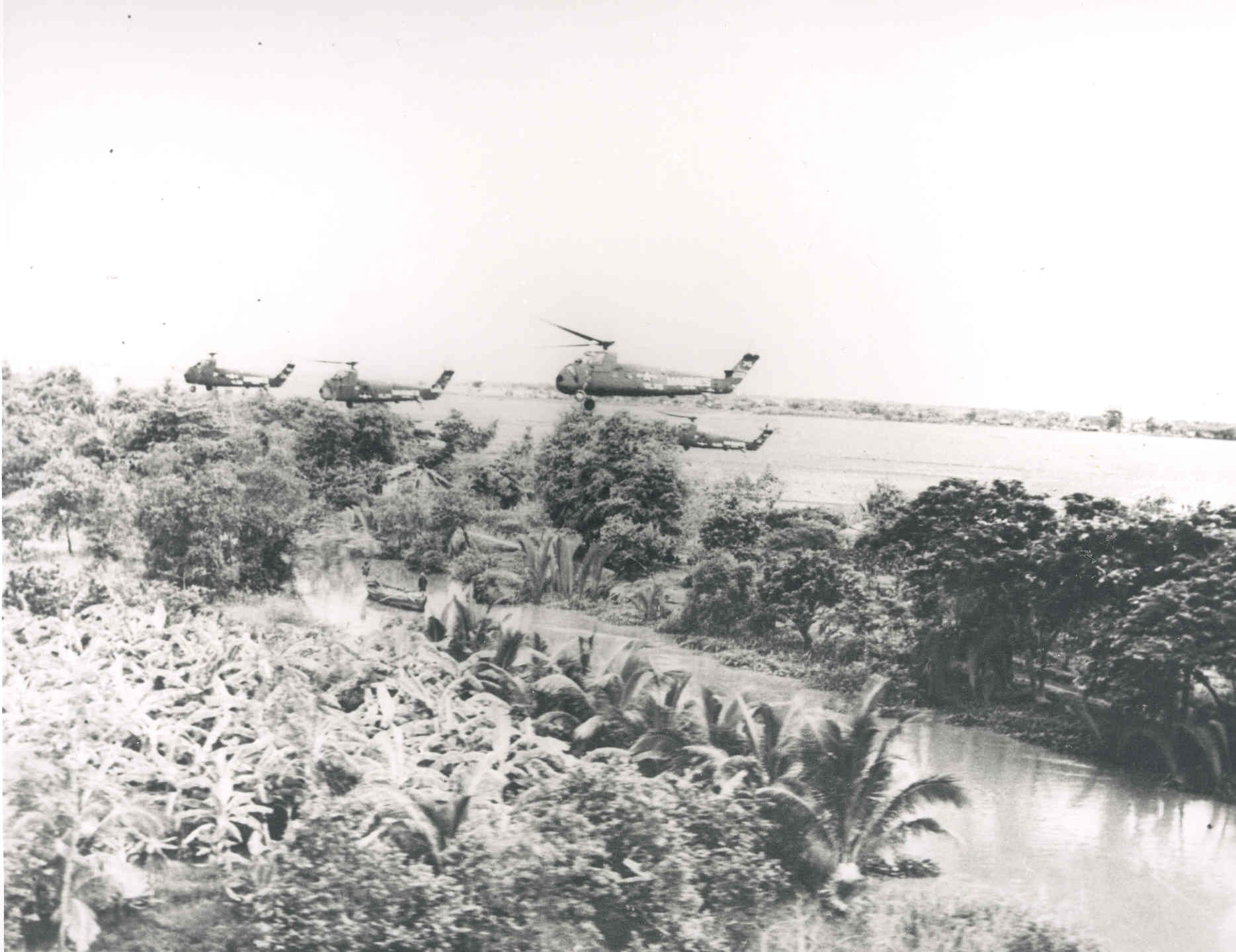
U.S. Marine Corps UH-34Ds over Vietnam, 1965.

Its higher availability and reliability due to its simplicity compared to the newer helicopters led Marines to ask for it by name. The phrases "give me a HUS", "get me a HUS" and "cut me a HUS" entered the U.S. Marine Corps vernacular, being used even after the type was no longer in use to mean "help me out".

USMC H-34s were also among the first helicopter gunships trialled in theatre, being fitted with the Temporary Kit-1 (TK-1), comprising two M60C machine guns and two 19-shot 2.75 inch rocket pods. The operations were met with mixed enthusiasm, and the armed H-34s, known as "Stingers" were quickly phased out. The TK-1 kit would form the basis of the TK-2 kit used on the UH-1E helicopters of the USMC.

An H-34 was featured in the famous early-Vietnam War Time-Life photo essay "One Ride With Yankee Papa 13", photographer Larry Burrows, which depicted stages of a disastrous combat mission in which several crew were wounded or killed.

=== Post-Vietnam War ===
The H-34 remained in service with United States Army and Marine Corps aviation units into the late 1960s; at this time it was also standard equipment in Marine Corps Reserve, Army Reserve and Army National Guard aviation units, eventually being replaced by the UH-1 Iroquois utility helicopter. Sikorsky terminated all production activities in 1968, a total of 1,821 having been built. All H-34 helicopters were retired from service in the U.S. military by the early 1970s; the type having the distinction of being the last piston-engined helicopter to be operated by the Marine Corps. On 3 September 1973, the last flight of a USMC UH-34 occurred as Bureau Number 147191 which had been formally assigned to Headquarters Squadron, FMF Pacific was flown from Quantico, Virginia to MCAS New River to be placed on static display.

=== France ===
France purchased an initial batch of 134 Choctaws; these were shipped in kit-form from the United States and locally assembled by Sud-Aviation. Later, a further 166 were domestically manufactured by Sud-Aviation; these were operated by theFrench Naval Aviation (Navy) and Air force.

=== United Kingdom ===
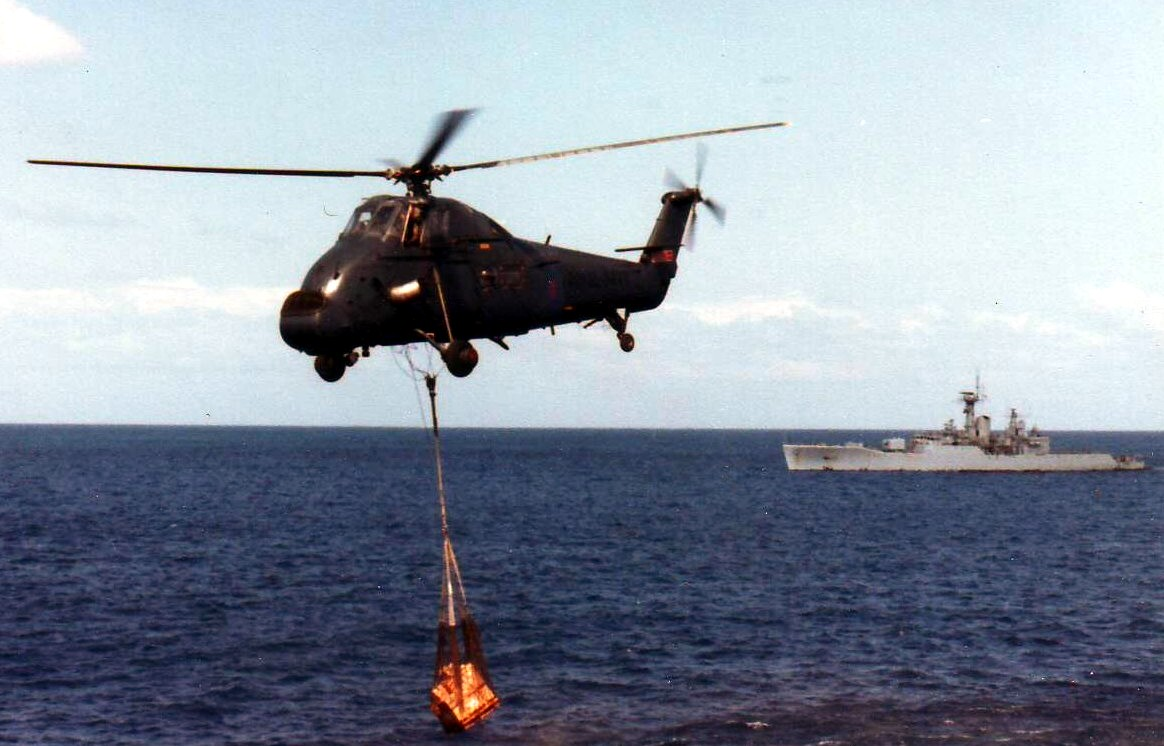
Wessex at Ascension Island, 1982

The Wessex was used as an anti-submarine and utility helicopter with the Royal Navy and as a transport and search and rescue helicopter with the Royal Air Force. British Wessex saw action in several conflicts: Falklands, Oman, Borneo, Aden, etc.

The twin-turbine Wessex served into the 21st century, and was one of the longest serving and successful of the H-34 types.

=== South Vietnam ===
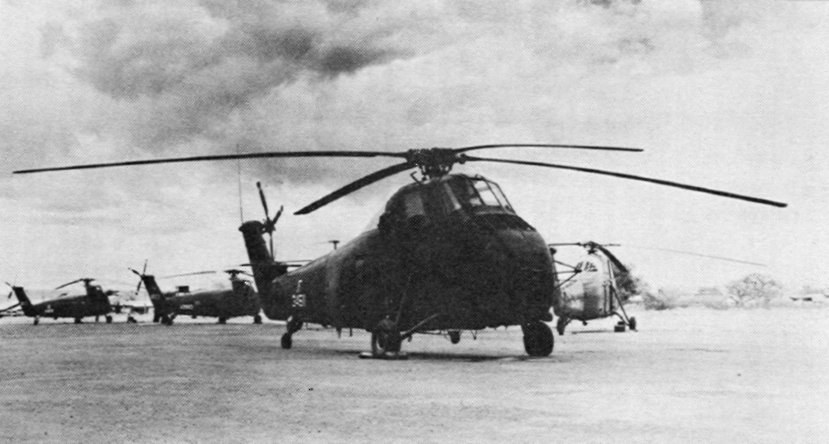
RVNAF CH-34As at Tan Son Nhut.

Used by RVNAF 219th Squadron to insert MACV-SOG reconnaissance teams into Laos. The H-34 was the primary RVNAF helicopter until replaced by the Bell UH-1 Huey.

=== Israel ===
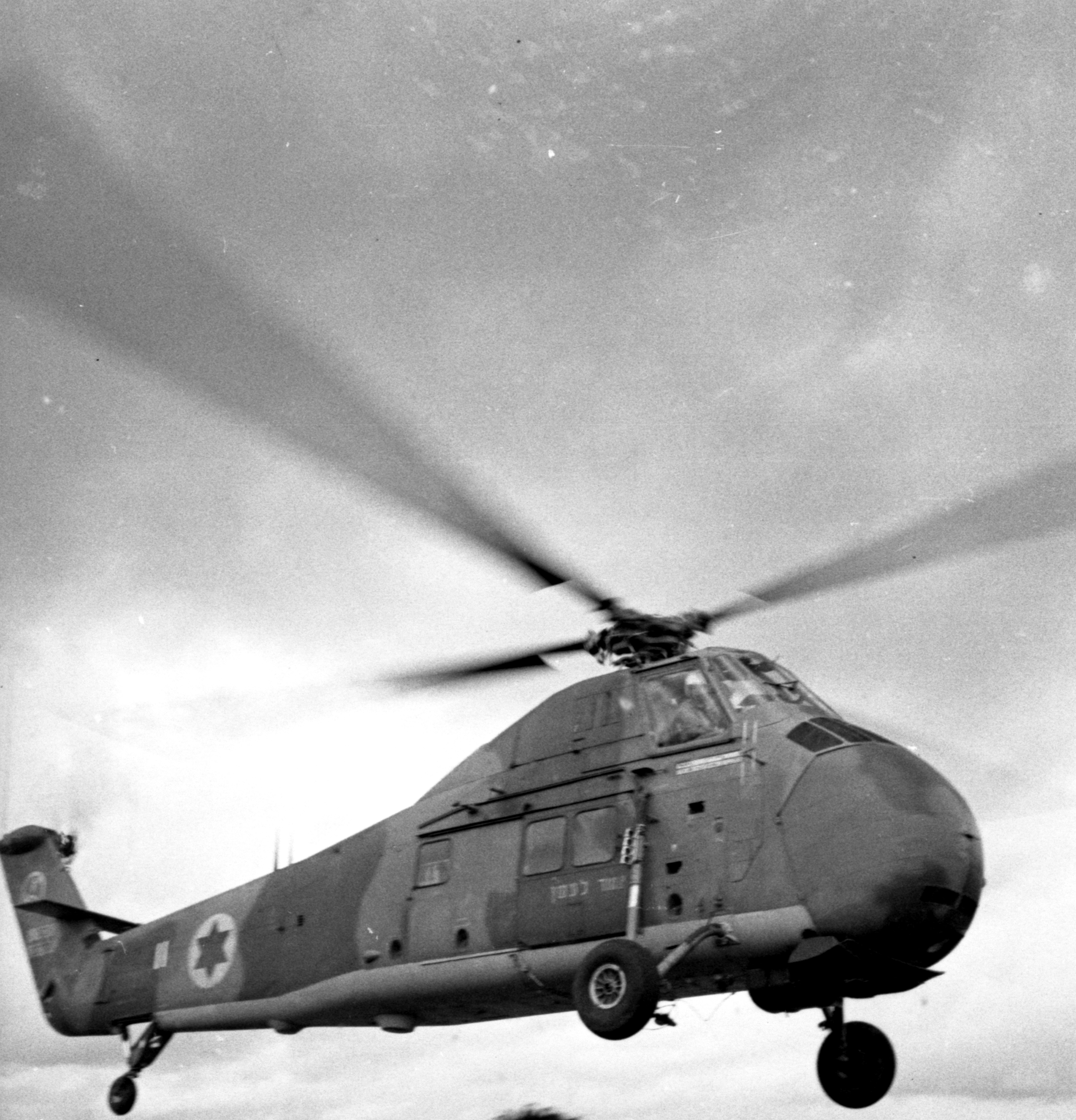
Israeli Air Force Sikorsky S-58 (1967)

Israeli S-58s flew numerous combat missions after the end of the Six-Day War; these missions were mainly against Palestinians infiltrating Israel or against their bases in Jordan. On 21 March 1968, various S-58s participated in the Battle of Karameh, bringing Israeli troops in and out of the theatre as well as evacuating the wounded. This was the last operation of the S-58 as it was retired shortly later, having been replaced by the newer Bell 205 and Aérospatiale Super Frelon.

=== Civilian use ===
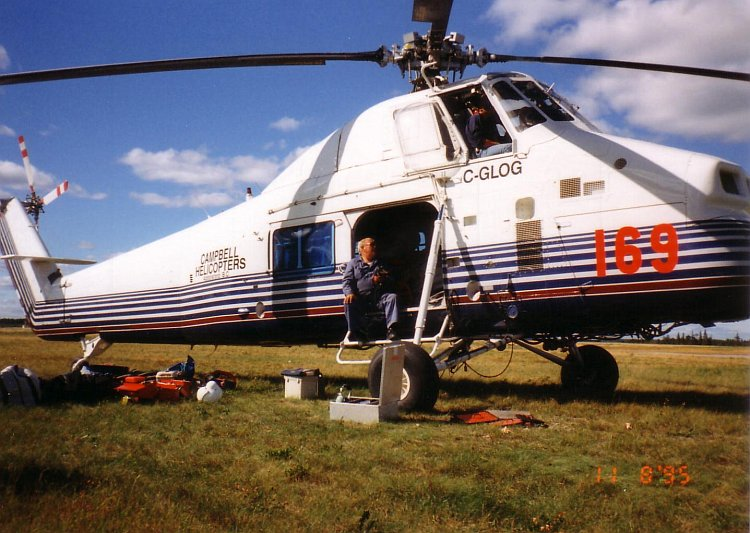
Civil S-58T powered by a Pratt & Whitney Canada PT6T Twin-Pac turbine power plant

The H-34's lift capacity was just sufficient to lift a Mercury space capsule. In 1961, the hatch of Mercury-Redstone 4 was prematurely detached and the capsule was filled with seawater. The extra weight was too much for the H-34 and the capsule, Liberty Bell 7, was emergency released and sank in deep water, remaining on the ocean floor until 1999.

The original piston-powered S-58s for the civilian and export market had their engines designated the Curtiss-Wright model 989C9HE-1, 989C9HE-2, or 998C9HE-2, which in most respects was identical to the R-1820-84 used on the military models. Sikorsky set up a production line in 1970 to remanufacture existing S-58 aircraft into the S-58T configuration, replacing the single piston engine with a pair of Pratt & Whitney Canada PT6T-3 Twin-Pac turboshafts; Sikorsky obtained a Federal Aviation Administration type certificate for the conversion in April 1971. The conversion enhanced safety, allowing the aircraft to continue flight after an engine failure, and greatly improved its hot and high performance; whereas the R-1820 could only provide full power up to an altitude of 700 ft (210 m), the paired PT-6s provide full power up to 6,000 ft (1,800 m), and an S-58T can fly at maximum gross weight up to 5,000 ft (1,500 m). The type certificate for the S-58T was sold to California Helicopter International in 1981.

In the late 1980s and early 1990s, S-58T helicopters were operated by New York Helicopters in scheduled passenger airline service between JFK International Airport and East 34th Street Heliport, New York.

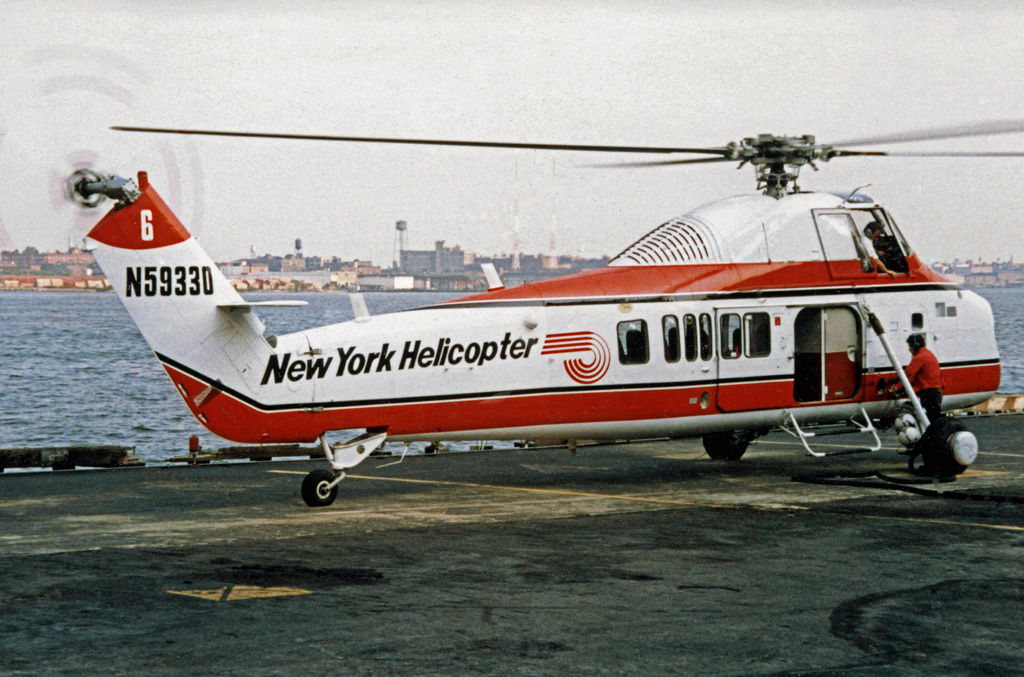
S-58T of New York Helicopter at 34th Street Helicopter pad in 1987

In the early 1970s, Orlando Helicopter Airways developed a novel civil conversion of the S-55/H-19, the Heli-Camper, a campervan-like conversion—featuring a built-in mini-kitchen and sleeping accommodations for four. Later in that decade, Orlando developed a larger version based on the S-58 and participated in a joint effort with popular American recreational vehicle (RV) manufacturer Winnebago Industries to market both aircraft as the Winnebago Heli-Home. The S-58 version featured a larger kitchenette, sleeping accommodations for six, a minibar, and an entertainment system; optional floats were offered for amphibious operations. The aircraft were featured in several American popular magazines and reportedly drew large crowds at RV shows and dealerships, but their high purchase price together with rising 1970s fuel prices resulted in very limited sales; production is not well documented but is estimated at only six or seven of the S-55 and S-58 versions combined.

== Variants ==
=== Pre-1962 USAF/Army designations ===
H-34A
U.S. Army version of the HSS-1 powered by a 1,525 hp R-1820-84, re-designated CH-34A in 1962, 359 built and 21 transferred from the U.S. Navy.
JH-34A
Designation for H-34A used for weapon tests.
VH-34A
Staff transport conversions of H-34A.
H-34B
H-34As converted with detail changes, became CH-34B in 1962.
H-34C
H-34B design with detail changes converted from H-34As, became CH-34C in 1962.

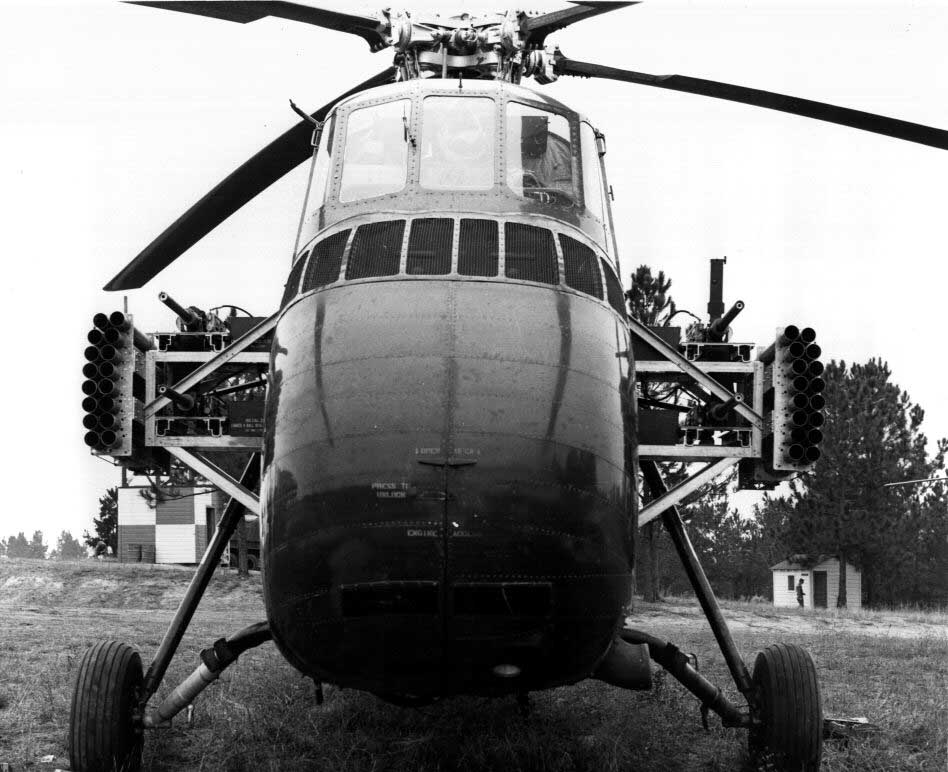
Choctaw gunship armed with XM3 armament system, 1962

=== US Navy designations ===
XHSS-1 Seabat
Three Sikorsky S-58s for evaluation by the U.S. Navy, re-designated YHSS-1 then YSH-34G in 1962.
HSS-1 Seabat
Production Anti-Submarine model for the U.S. Navy, re-designated SH-34G in 1962, 215 built
HSS-1F Seabat
One HSS-1 re-engined with two YT-58-GE as a flying test bed, re-designated SH-34H in 1962.
YHSS-1N Seabat
One HSS-1 converted as the HSS-1N prototype, re-designated YSH-34J in 1962.
HSS-1N Seabat
Night/Bad weather version of the HSS-1 with improved avionics and autopilot, re-designated SH-34J in 1962, 167 built (an addition 75 HSS-1 airframes were built to CH-34C standard for West Germany).
HUS-1 Seahorse
Utility transport version of the HSS-1 for the U.S. Marine Corps, re-designated UH-34D in 1962, 462 built
HUS-1A Seahorse
Forty HUS-1s fitted with amphibious pontoons, re-designated UH-34E in 1962.
HUS-1G Seahorse
United States Coast Guard version of the HUS-1, re-designated HH-34F in 1962, six built.
HUS-1L Seahorse
Four HUS-1s converted for Antarctic operations with VXE-6, re-designated LH-34D in 1962.
HUS-1Z Seahorse
Seven HUS-1s fitted with VIP interior for the Executive Flight Detachment, re-designated VH-34D in 1962.

=== Post-1962 Tri-Service designations ===
CH-34A
H-34A re-designated in 1962
CH-34B
H-34B re-designated in 1962
CH-34C
H-34C re-designated in 1962
JH-34C
Designation for CH-34C used for weapon tests.
VH-34C
Staff transport conversions of CH-34C.
HH-34D
Designation applied to aircraft given USAF serials to be transferred under MAP and MDAP.
LH-34D
HUS-1L re-designated in 1962
UH-34D
HUS-1 re-designated in 1962 and 54 new build.
VH-34D
HUS-1Z re-designated in 1962
UH-34E
HUS-1A re-designated in 1962
HH-34F
HUS-1G re-designated in 1962
YSH-34G
YHSS-1 re-designated in 1962
SH-34G
HSS-1 re-designated in 1962
SH-34H
HSS-1F re-designated in 1962

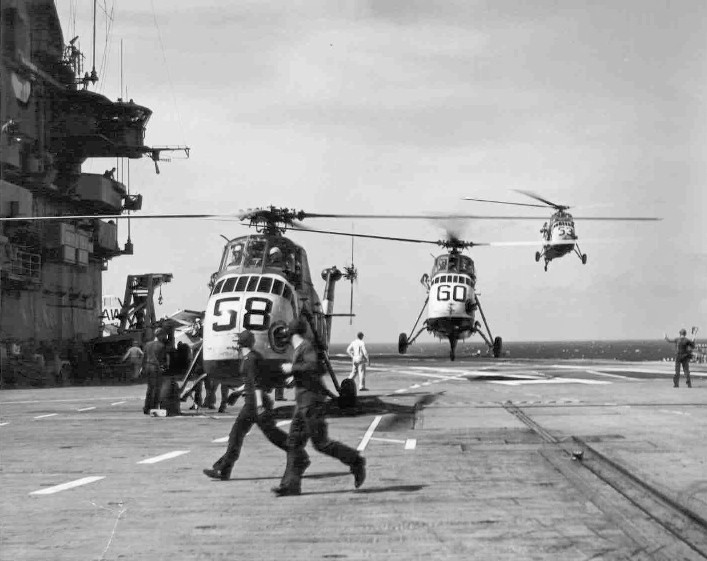
SH-34Js on the USS Essex in 1962

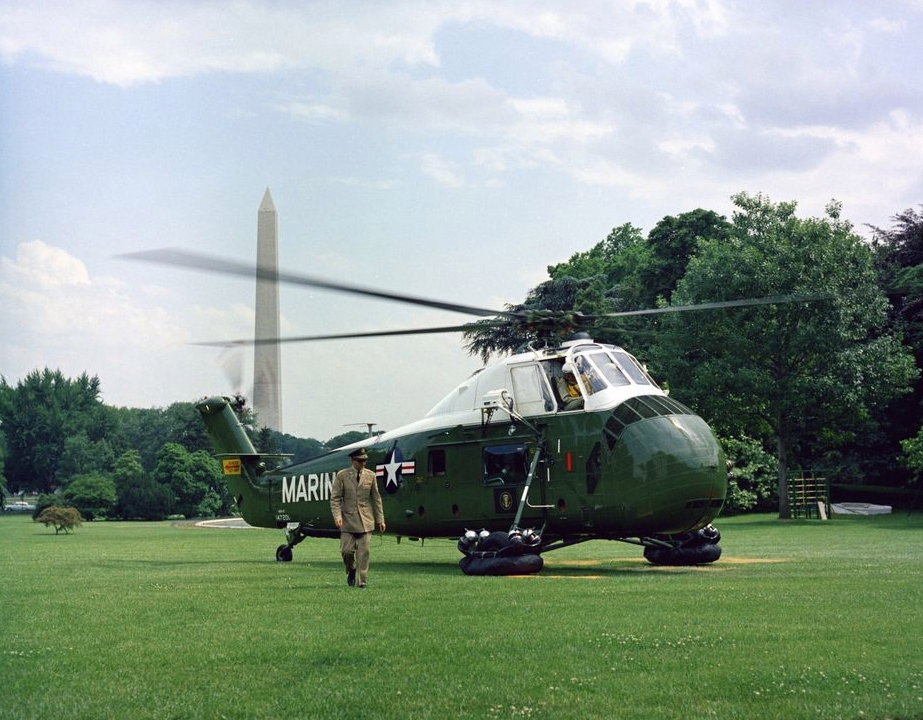
A VH-34D Marine One presidential helicopter (BuNo 147201) on the White House South Lawn in 1961

YSH-34J
YHSS-1N re-designated in 1962
SH-34J
HSS-1N re-designated in 1962
UH-34J
SH-34J without ASW equipment for cargo and training purposes.
HH-34J
Ex-USN UH-34Js operated by the U.S. Air Force
VH-34J
Staff transport conversions of SH-34J.

=== Canadian designations ===
CH-126
Canadian military designation for the S-58B.

=== Thai designations ===
H.4
(Thai: ฮ.๔) Royal Thai Armed Forces designation for the H-34B.
H.4A
(Thai: ฮ.๔ก) Royal Thai Armed Forces designation for the S-58T.

=== Civil variants ===
S-58A
Basic cargo variant. Not sold commercially. Type certified on 2 August 1956.
S-58B
Improved cargo variant. Type certified on 2 August 1956.

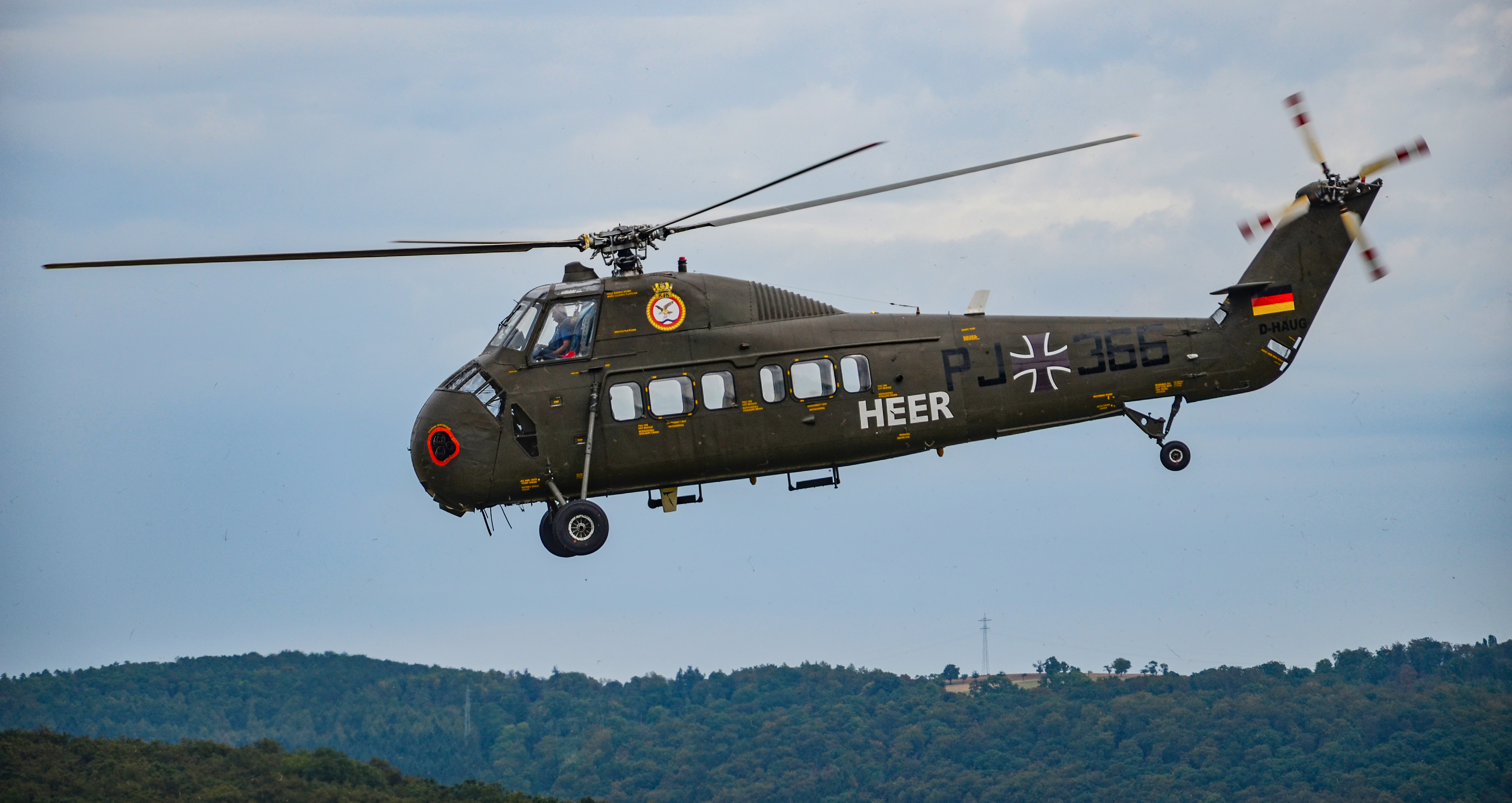
S-58C at Schreckhof airfield in warbird livery, 2016.

S-58C
Passenger transport/airliner variant. Type certified on 2 August 1956.

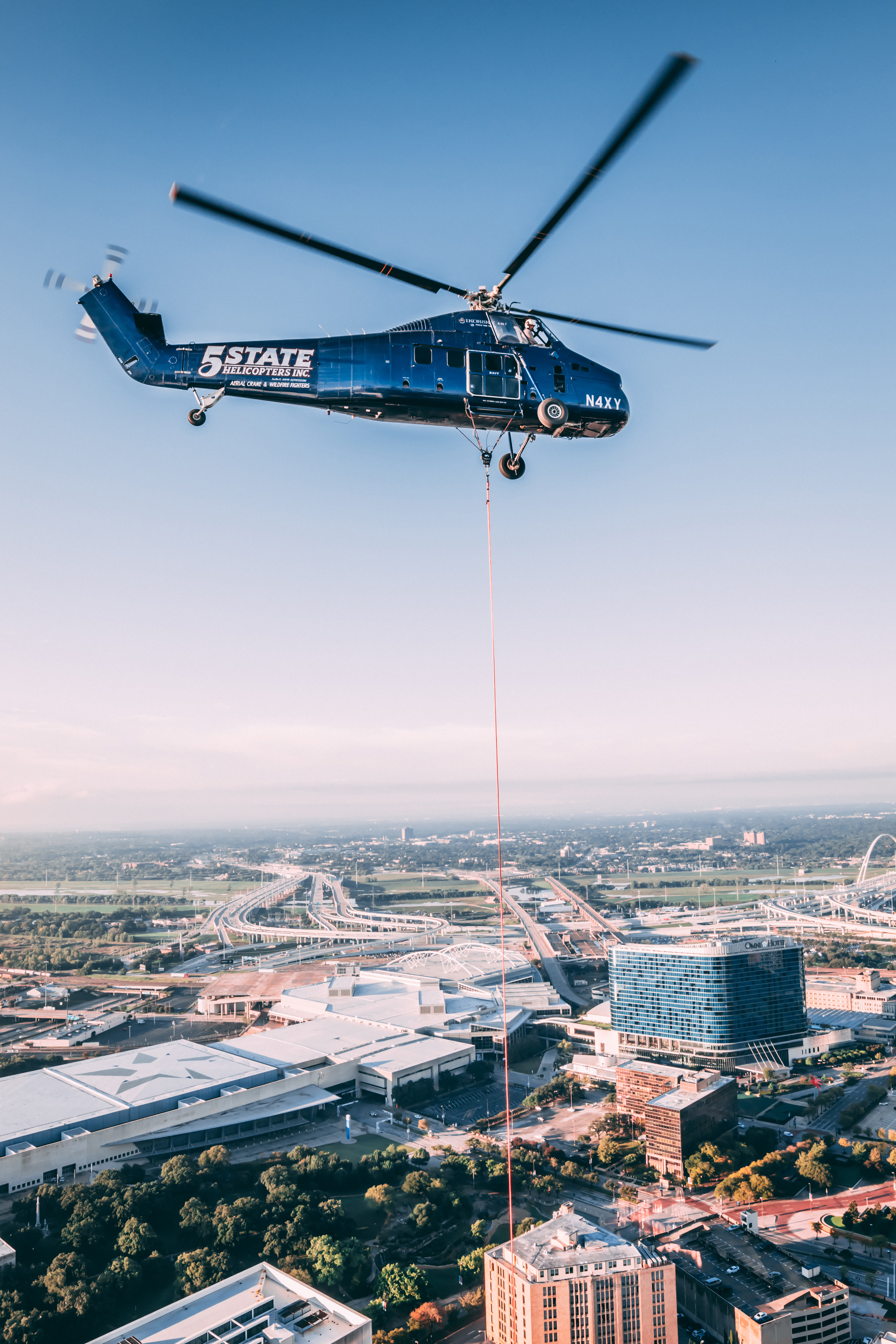
An S-58T performing an external load operation in Dallas, Texas.

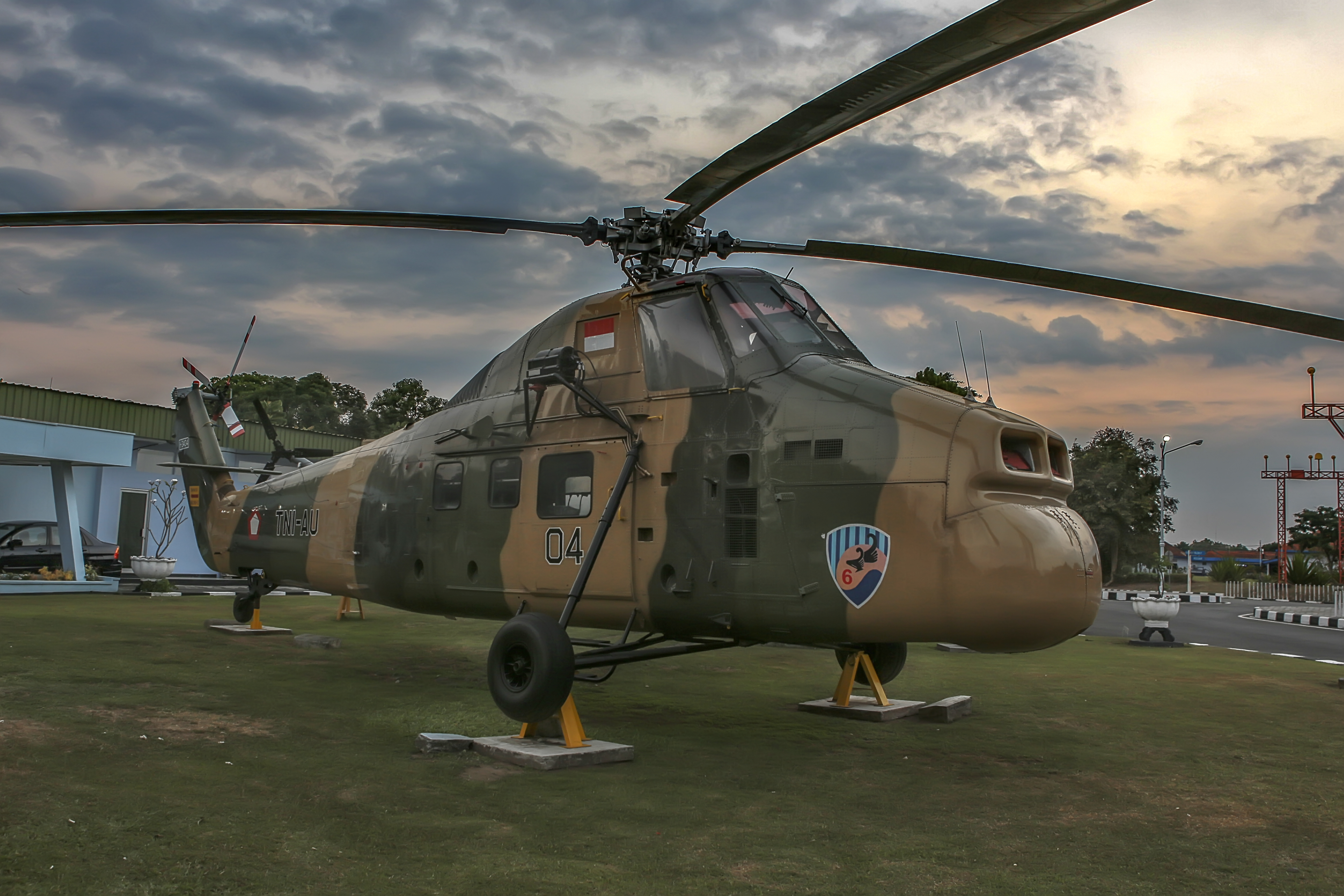
A retired S-58T Twinpac, with its distinctive squared "nostrils" on the nose. On display at an Indonesian aviation Museum

S-58D
Airliner/freighter variant. Reduced fuel capacity compared to the B/C models. Type certified on 15 December 1961.
S-58E
Airliner/freighter variant. Reduced fuel capacity compared to the B/C models. Many ex-military H-34s were converted to this standard for civilian use. Type certified on 27 May 1971.
S-58F
Increased maximum weight variant of the S-58B. Type certified in 1972.
S-58G
Increased maximum weight variant of the S-58C. Type certified in 1972.
S-58H
Increased maximum weight variant of the S-58D. Type certified in 1972.
S-58J
Increased maximum weight variant of the S-58E. Type certified in 1972.
S-58T
Commercial conversion to turboshaft power using Pratt & Whitney Canada PT6T-3 Twin-Pac turboshaft with special nose cowling featuring distinctive twin rectangular air intakes. Note that "S-58T" is an umbrella term used to refer to all turboshaft-powered variants of the S-58, and that there was no standalone model designated "S-58T".
S-58BT
Turboshaft-powered conversion of the S-58B. Type certified on 18 February 1972.
S-58DT
Turboshaft-powered conversion of the S-58D. Type certified on 18 February 1972.
S-58ET
Turboshaft-powered conversion of the S-58E. Many ex-military H-34s were converted to this standard for civilian use. Type certified on 18 February 1972.
S-58FT
Turboshaft-powered conversion of the S-58F. Type certified on 27 March 1972.
S-58HT
Turboshaft-powered conversion of the S-58H. Type certified on 27 March 1972.
S-58JT
Turboshaft-powered conversion of the S-58J. Type certified on 27 March 1972.
Orlando Heli-Camper / Winnebago Heli-Home
RV conversion by Winnebago Industries and Orlando Helicopter, fitted with a Wright Cyclone R-1820-24 engine
Orlando Airliner
Commercial conversion. 18-seat passenger transport helicopter.

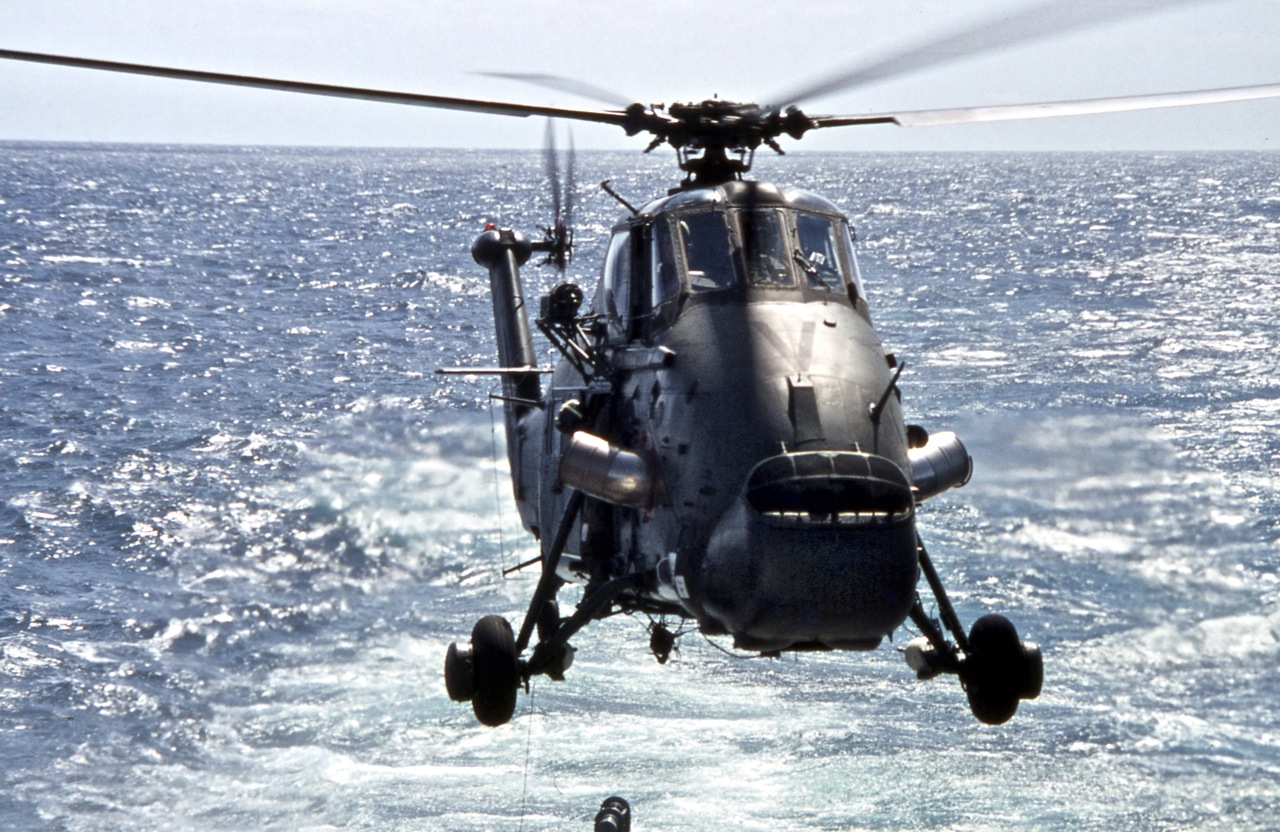
Wessex of the Royal Navy, 1980

=== Licensed variants ===
Westland Wessex
Licence production and development in the United Kingdom.

== Operators ==
Argentina

- Argentine Air Force
- Argentine Naval Aviation

Belgium

- Belgian Air Force
- Belgian Navy

Brazil

- Brazilian Navy

Canada

- Royal Canadian Air Force
- Canadian Armed Forces

Chile

- Chilean Navy

Costa Rica

- Ministry of Public Security

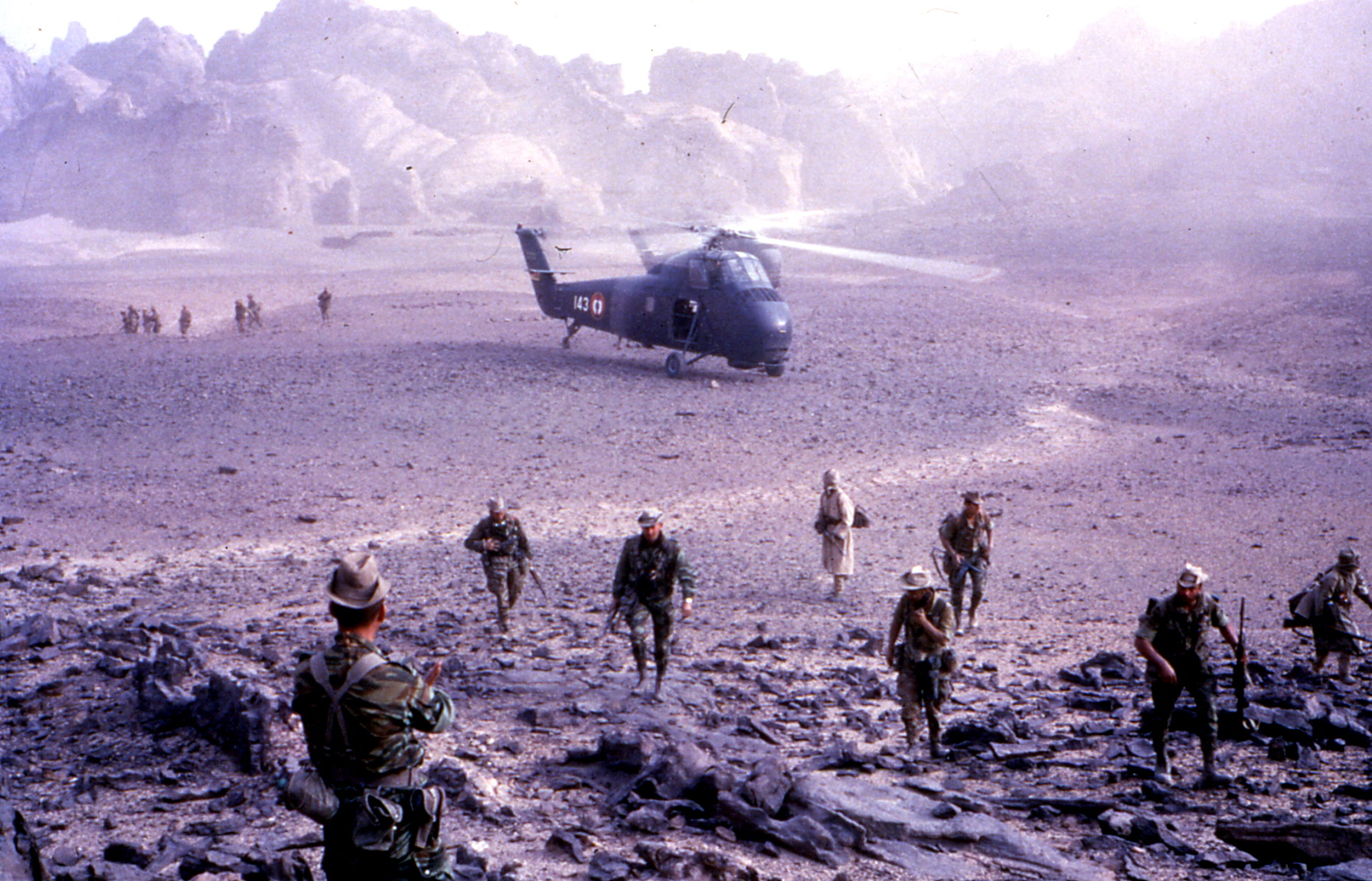
French Navy helicopter H-34 and French paratroopers during a 1971 operation in Chad.

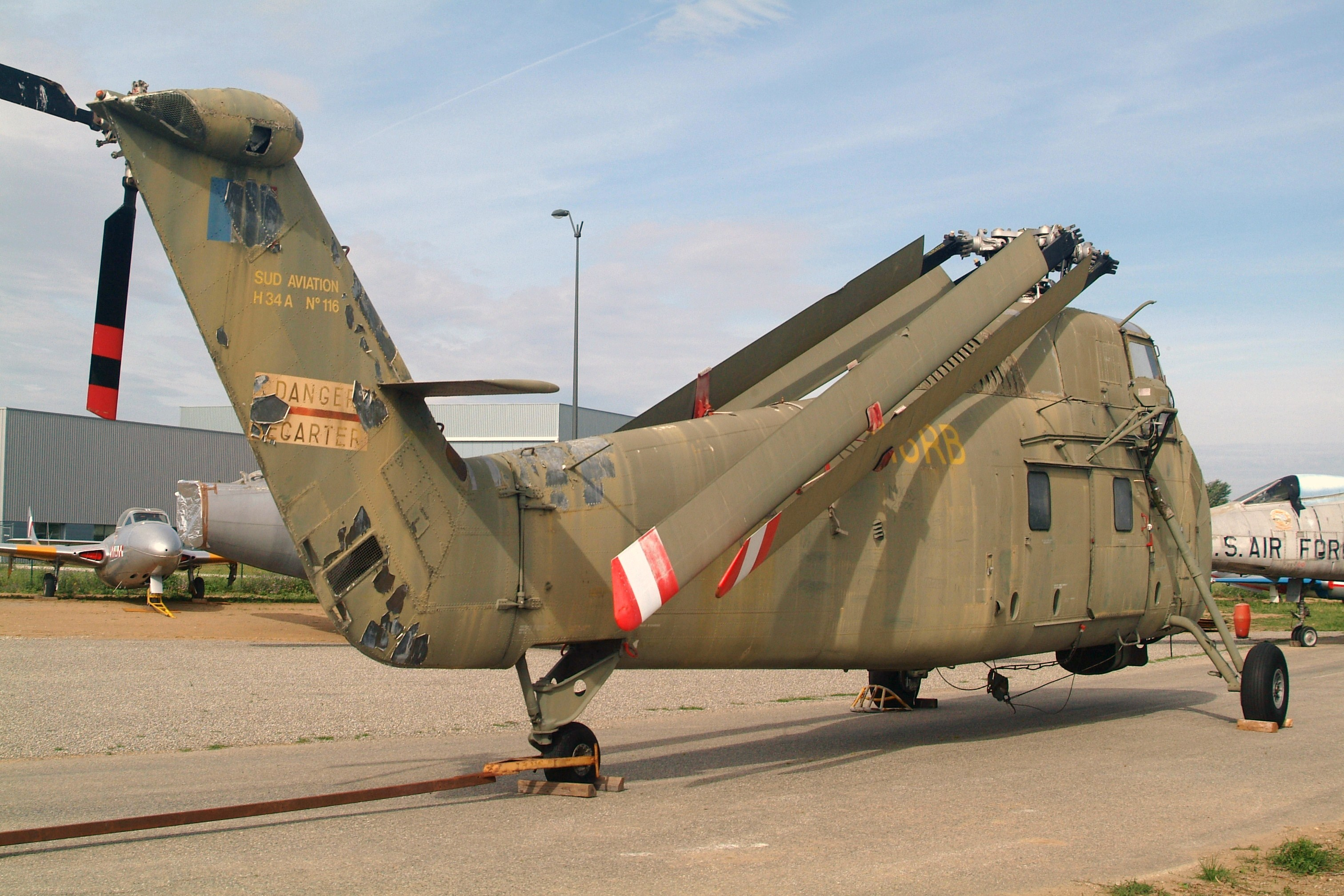
A Sud Aviation SA116, the H-34J of the French Air Force in 2006, now retired

France

- French Army
- French Navy

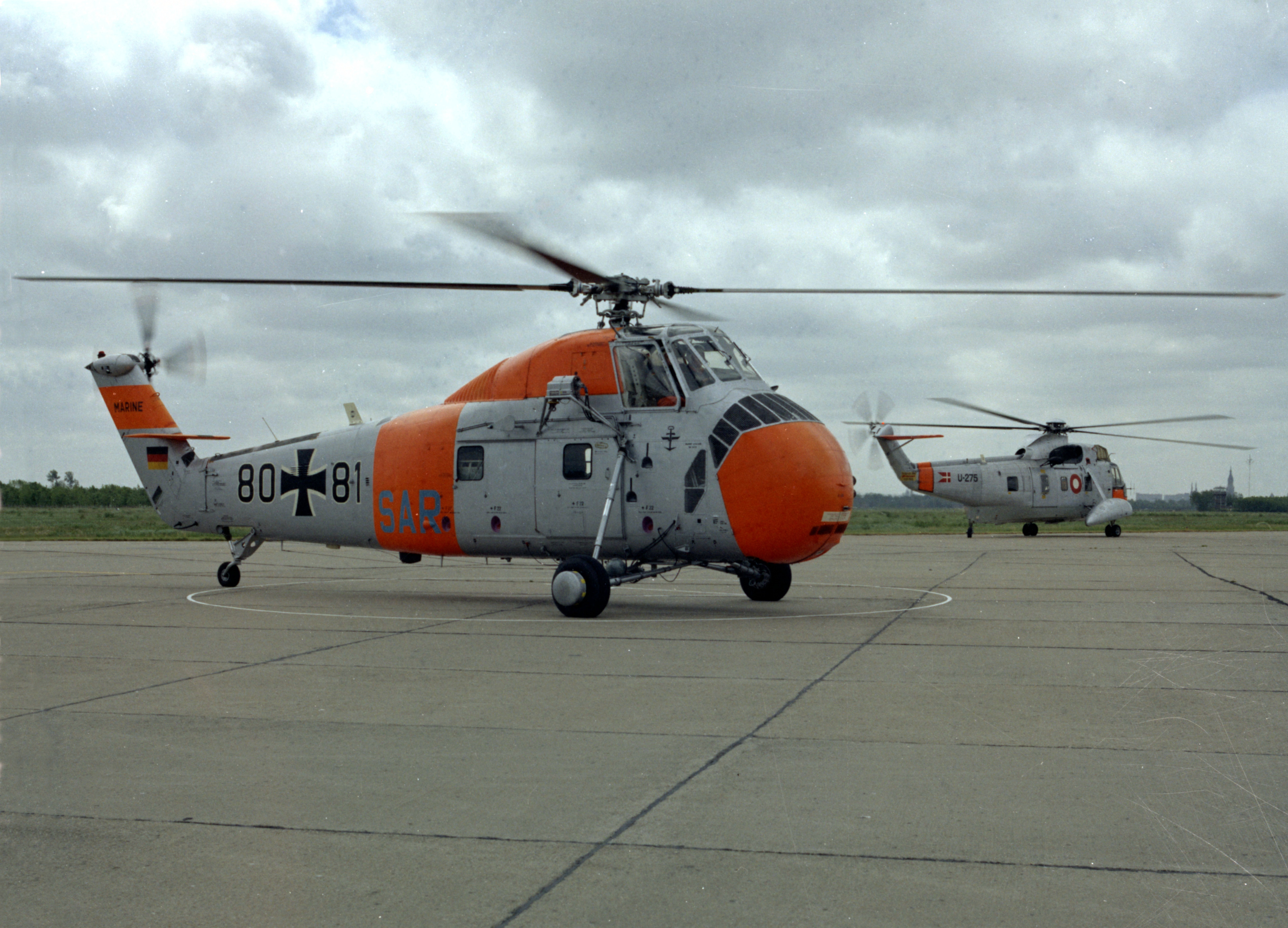
West German Navy Sikorsky H-34G and Royal Danish Air Force Sikorsky S-61A at Ypenburg air base, the Netherlands, 1970

West Germany

- German Air Force
- German Army
- German Navy

Haiti

- Haitian Air Corps

Indonesia

- Indonesian Air Force

Italy

- Italian Air Force

Israel

- Israeli Air Force

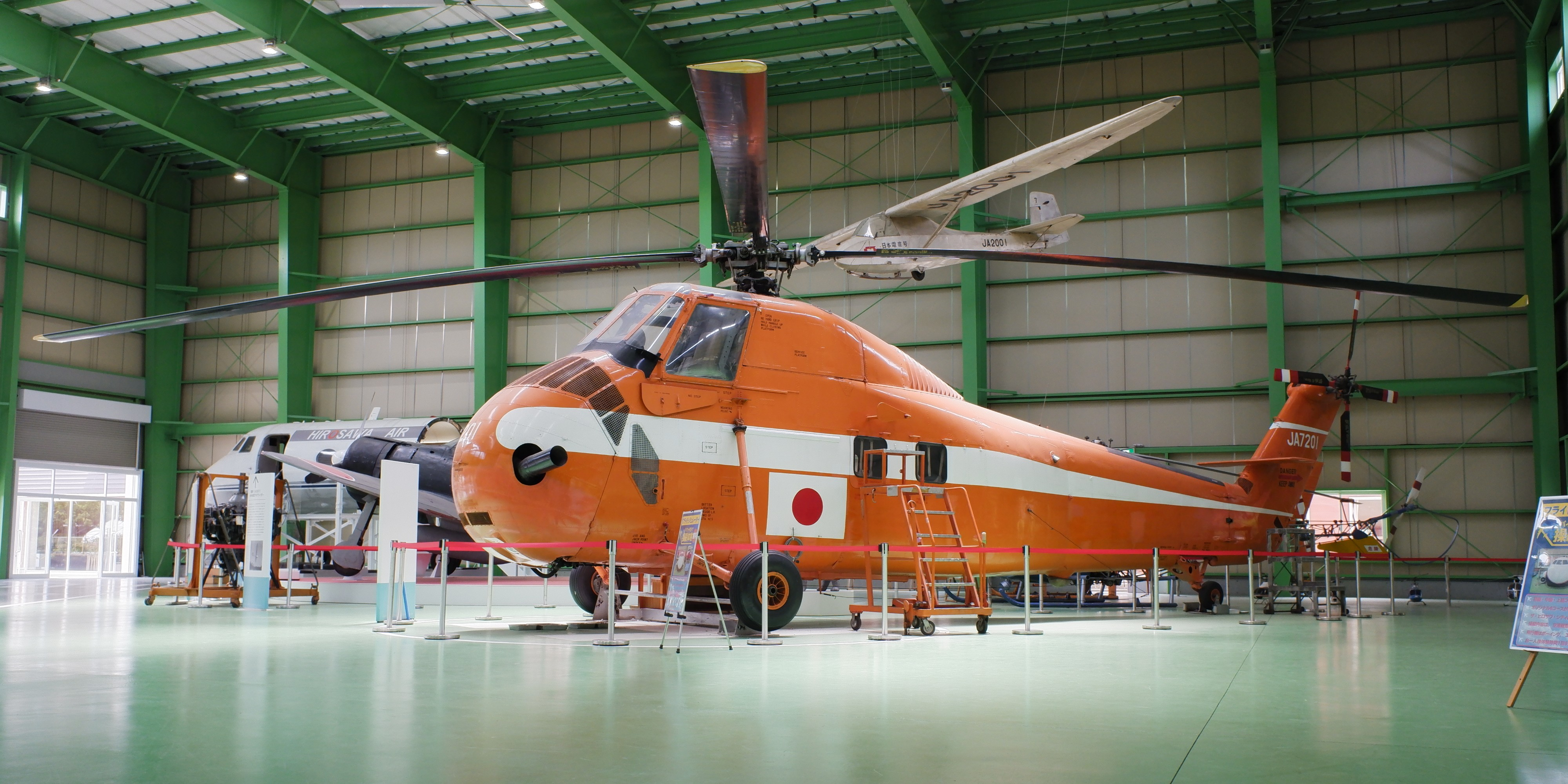
S-58B used by the Japan Coast Guard, notable for being the helicopter that rescued the sled dogs Taro and Jiro in 1959

Japan

- Japan Maritime Self-Defense Force
- Japan Coast Guard

Khmer Republic

- Khmer Air Force

Kingdom of Laos

- Royal Lao Air Force

Netherlands

- Royal Netherlands Navy

Nicaragua

- Fuerza Aérea Sandinista

Philippines

- Philippine Air Force

Spain

- Spain

South Vietnam

- Republic of Vietnam Air Force

Republic of China

- Republic of China Army

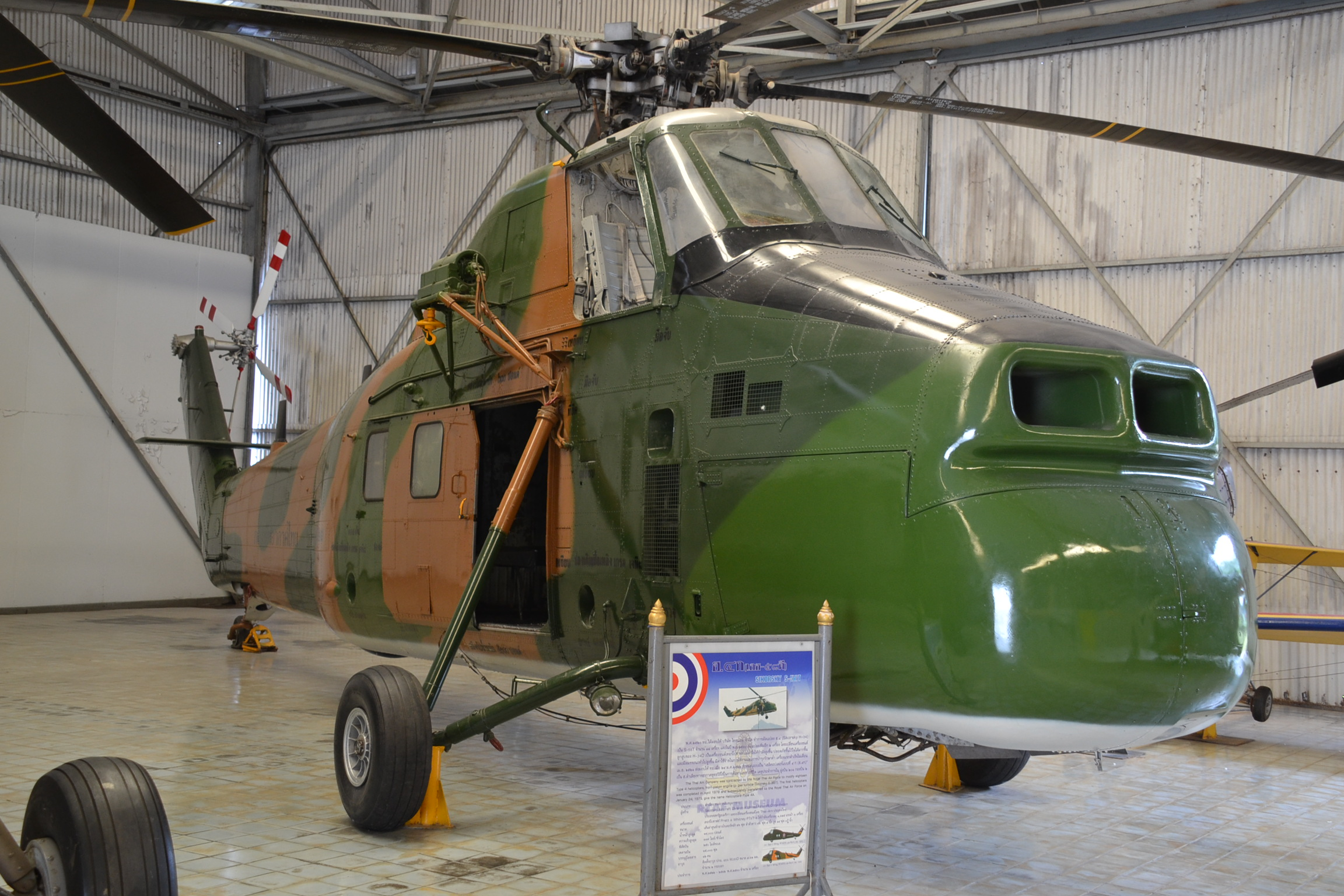
Sikorsky S-58T at the Royal Thai Air Force Museum, Bangkok Thailand

Thailand

- Royal Thai Air Force

United States

- Air America
- United States Air Force
- United States Army
- United States Marine Corps
- United States Navy
- United States Coast Guard

Uruguay

- Uruguayan Navy

== Accidents and incidents ==
- 27 July 1960 Chicago Helicopter Airways Flight 698 a S-58C registered N879 crashed into Forest Home Cemetery, Forest Park, Illinois, United States with the loss of 11 passengers and two crew. The investigation concluded that the helicopter became uncontrollable as a result of structural disintegration in flight caused by a fatigue failure of the main rotor blade.
- 14 November 1971 Sikorsky SH-34J, A-062 of the Uruguayan Navy lost control after trying to lift a ground vehicle in an airshow, the helicopter fell to the ground hitting another Sikorsky SH-34J Helicopter. The broken blades flew directly into the audience of the airshow killing 8 people and severely injuring and mutilating at least 40 more. Due to the unstable political situation of the country at the time, no investigation followed the accident. Several years later, many irregularities came to light: The helicopter condition was not good when it was purchased by the Uruguayan Navy, fuel used was not appropriate, temperature on the day of the accident was too high to attempt a heavy lift, and the co-pilot of the helicopter was a fixed wing pilot with no experience in rotary wing aircraft.
- 10 July 2002 Sikorsky S-58ET, N580US (S/N 58-1673, built 1963), struck power transmission lines with its tailwheel, ripping the aircraft in two, over Brookville Lake, Indiana. One crew member was killed; the other two crew members were rescued by boaters. The aircraft was operated by Midwest Helicopter Airways of Hinsdale, Illinois, and registered to Midwest Truxton International of Burr Ridge, Illinois. "Based on interviews with witnesses and the surviving pilots, there was no indication of any mechanical failure," said SGT. Steve Comer of the Indiana State Police. NTSB Accident Report #CHI02FA189
- 13 March 2011 Sikorsky S-58ET, N33602, suffered an engine failure, descended and veered off the side of an office building in El Segundo, California while lifting an external air conditioning unit from the roof. The commercial pilot was seriously injured and the helicopter was substantially damaged and consumed by a post-impact fire. The helicopter was registered to Heli Flight, Inc., and operated by Aris Helicopters.

== Aircraft on display ==
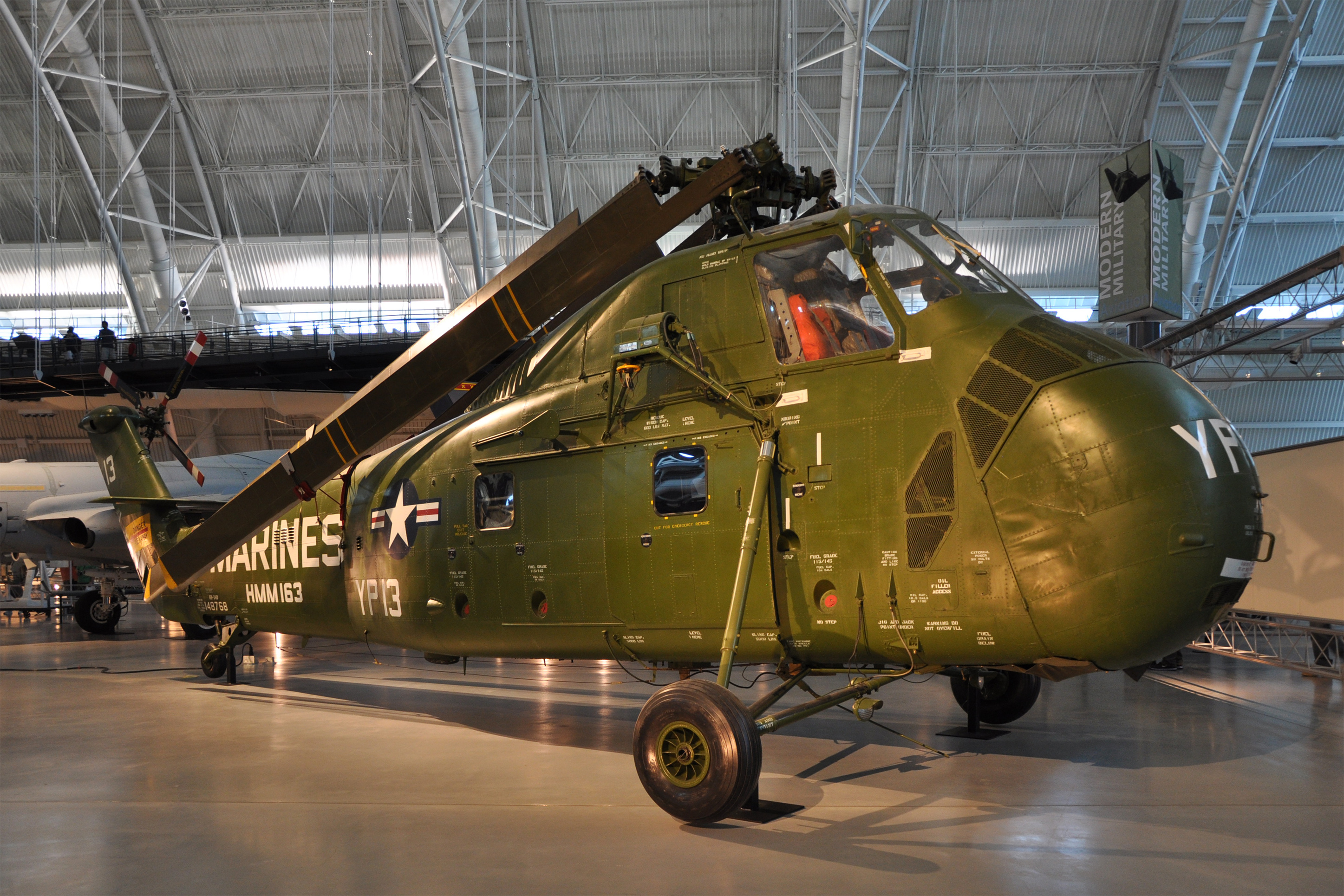
Sikorsky UH-34D Seahorse in National Air and Space Museum

=== Canada ===
- 130761 – H34C in storage at the Reynolds-Alberta Museum in Wetaskiwn, Alberta.

=== Chile ===
- Naval 52 – SH-34J on static display at Viña del Mar Airport in Viña del Mar, Valparaíso. This airframe was the second of two received by the Chilean Navy and was exhibited for the first time after restoration at Exponaval 2014. It was previously on display at Alberto Widmer High School.

=== France ===
- HSS-1, No. 182, is on display at the Base d'aéronautique navale d'Hyères, the military part of the Toulon–Hyères Airport in France. Serving until 1977 with 31F squadron, it was one of the last operational H-34's in French Naval Aviation. Now restored, No. 182 is displayed in the typical navy blue color of the French navy's helicopters of this time period.

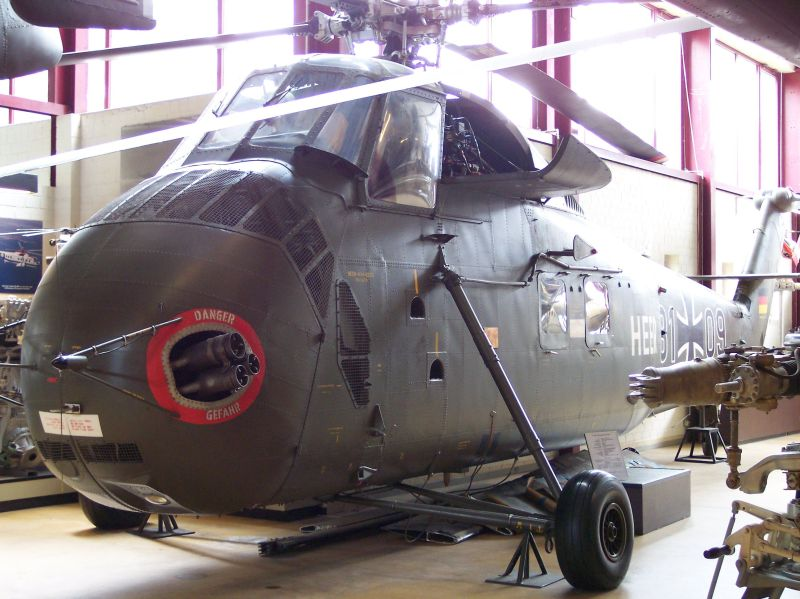
H-34 of the Heer

=== Germany ===
- 80+73 – SH-34G on static display at the Deutsches Museum Flugwerft Schleissheim in Oberschleißheim, Bavaria.
- 81+09 – H-34 GIII on static display at the Hubschraubermuseum Bückeburg in Bückeburg, Lower Saxony.
- 58-0356 – S-58C on static display at the Auto & Technik Museum Sinsheim in Sinsheim, Baden-Württemberg.

=== Indonesia ===
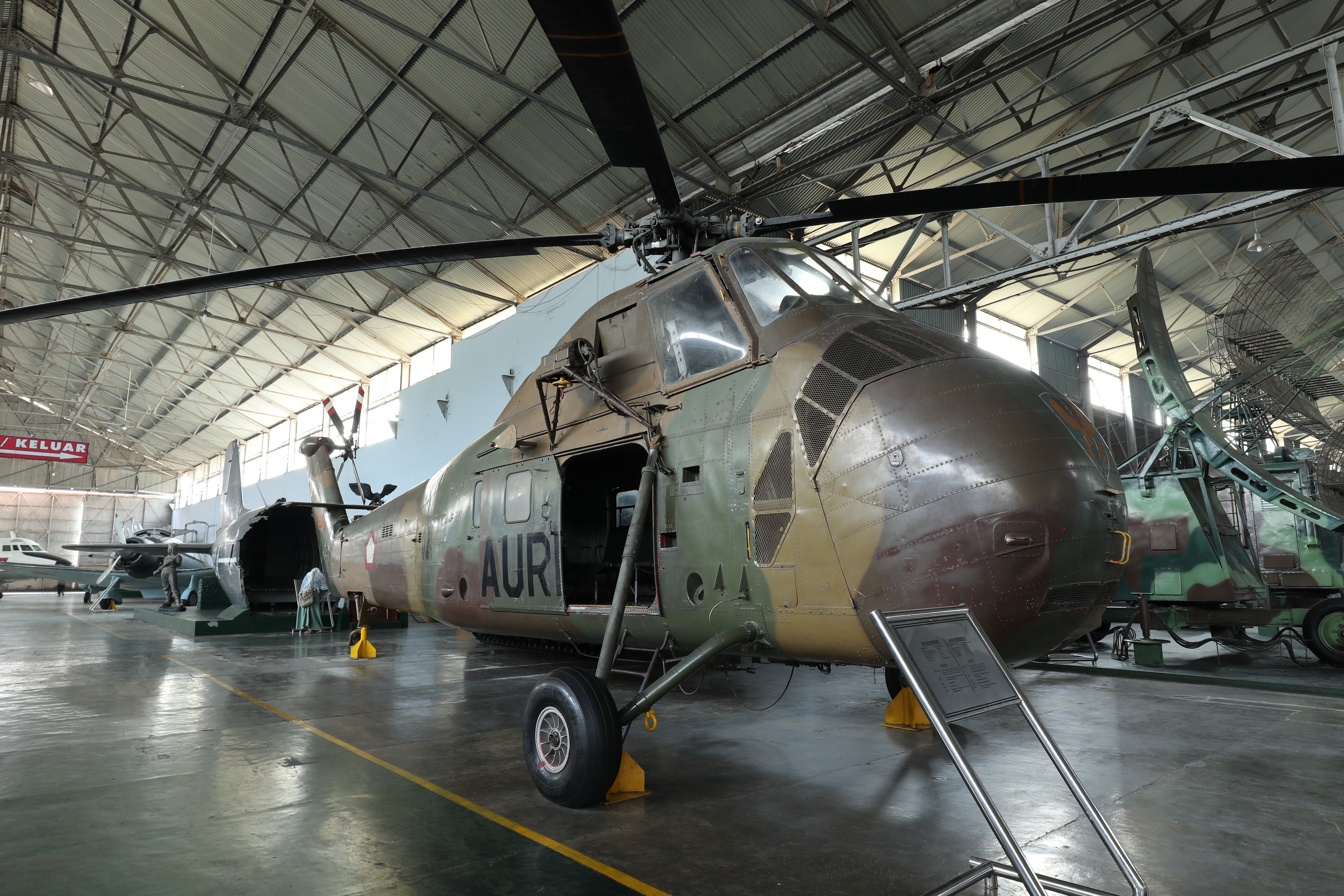
- Indonesian Air Force UH-34 number H-3402 inside Dirgantara Mandala Museum in Yogyakarta (Java Island, Indonesia)
  H-3402 – UH-34 on static display at Dirgantara Mandala Museum in Yogyakarta.
- H-3404 – S-58T on static display outside Dirgantara Mandala Museum in Yogyakarta.
- H-3415 – S-58T on static display in front of Atang Senjaya airbase in Bogor.

=== Japan ===
- JA7201 – S-58B on static display at The Hirosawa City theme park in Chikusei, Japan. Previously on display at National Museum of Nature and Science in Ueno Park. Notable for participating in the Japanese Antarctic Research Expeditions from 1959 to 1962 and rescuing the sled dogs Taro and Jiro.

=== Netherlands ===
- A former Royal Netherlands Navy SH-34J Seabat bearing the markings of number 134 operating from Valkenburg naval air station is on display with folded rotor blades and tail in the newly opened "Nationaal Militair Museum" situated at the former airbase of Soesterberg. Previously the aircraft was displayed in the National Air Force museum at Kamp Zeist which has since closed down.

=== Thailand ===
- H4k-64/30 – Type 4A on static display at the Royal Thai Air Force Museum in Bangkok, Bangkok.
- Unknown ID – Type 4 on static display at the Royal Thai Air Force Museum in Bangkok, Bangkok.

=== Philippines ===
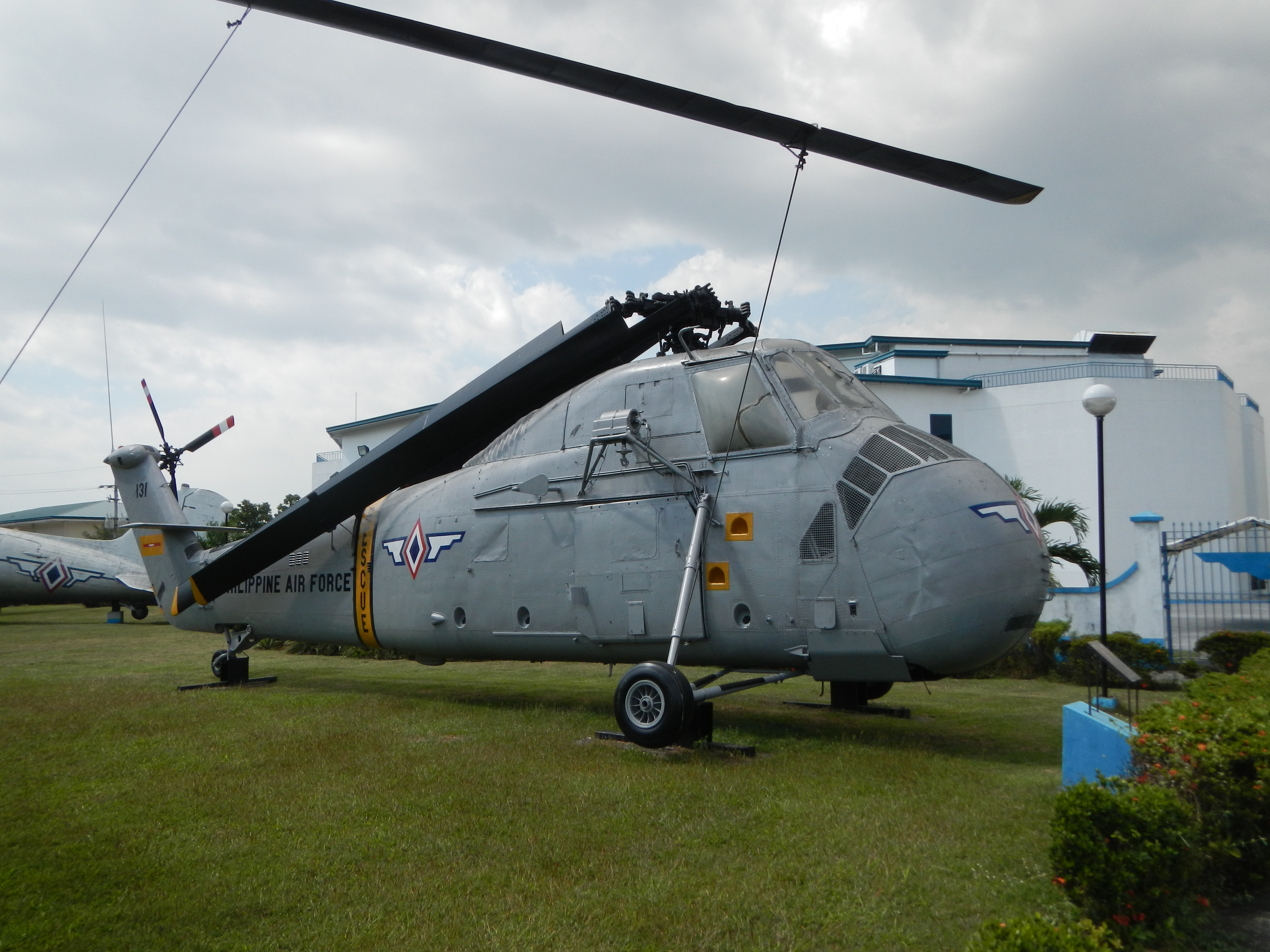
A Sikorsky H-34 helicopter on display at the Philippine Air Force Aerospace Museum in Manila.

- 153131 – UH-34D on static display at the Philippine Air Force Aerospace Museum in Villamor Air Base, Pasay.

=== United States ===
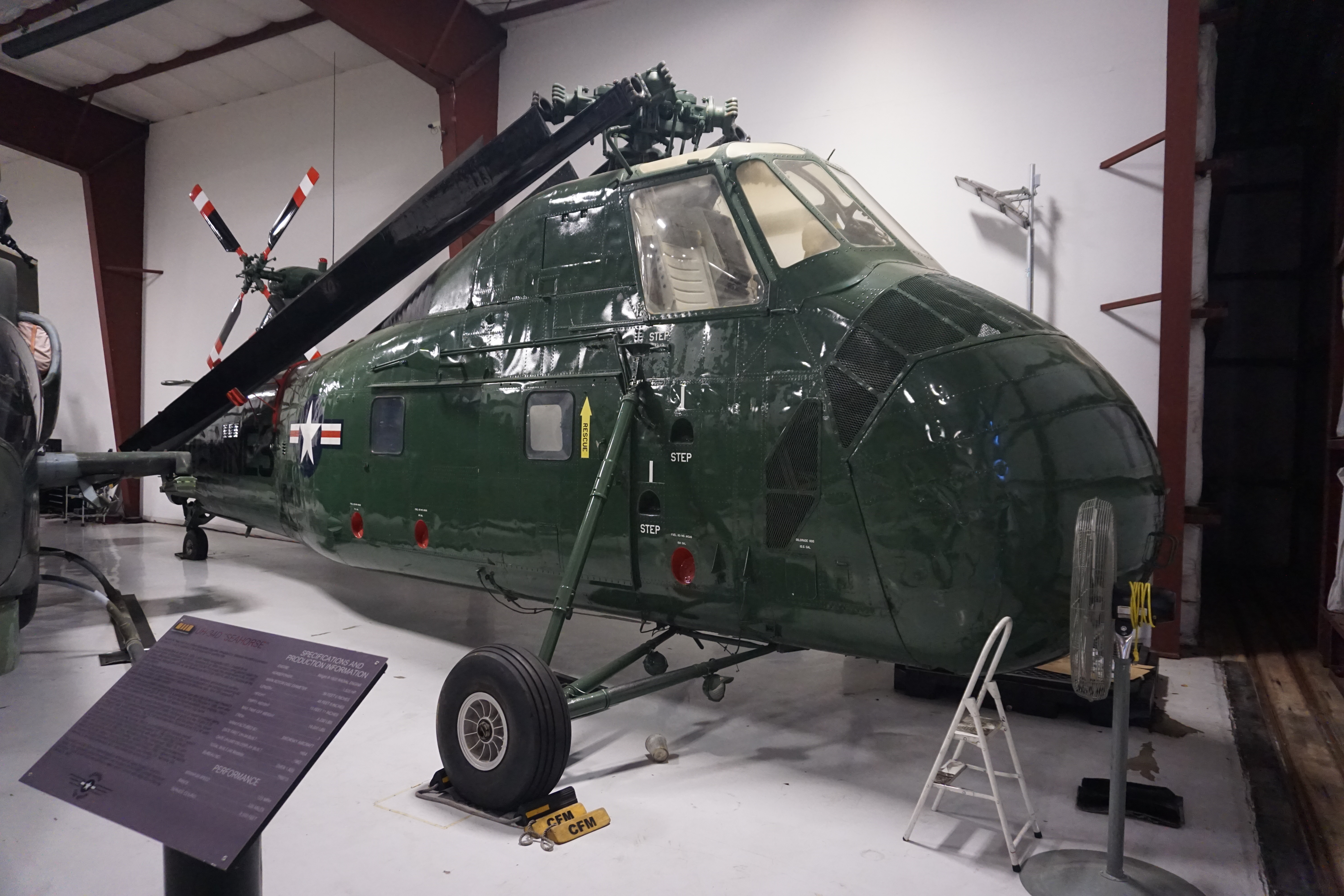
UH-34D at the Cavanaugh Flight Museum, Texas

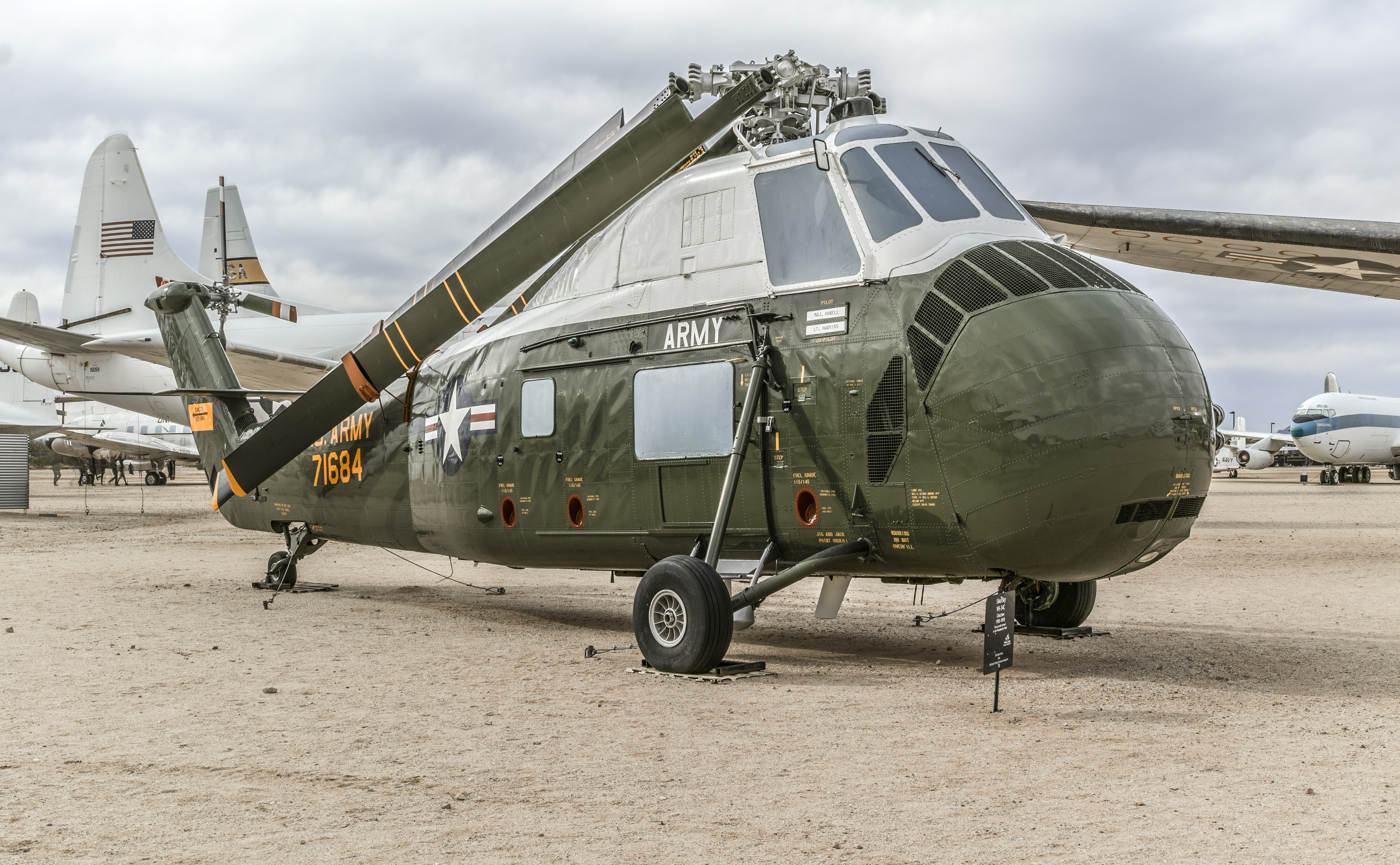
VH-34C of the Presidential Fleet. In service with the head-of-state it would have gone by callsign "Army One"; since 1976 only "Marine One" is used.

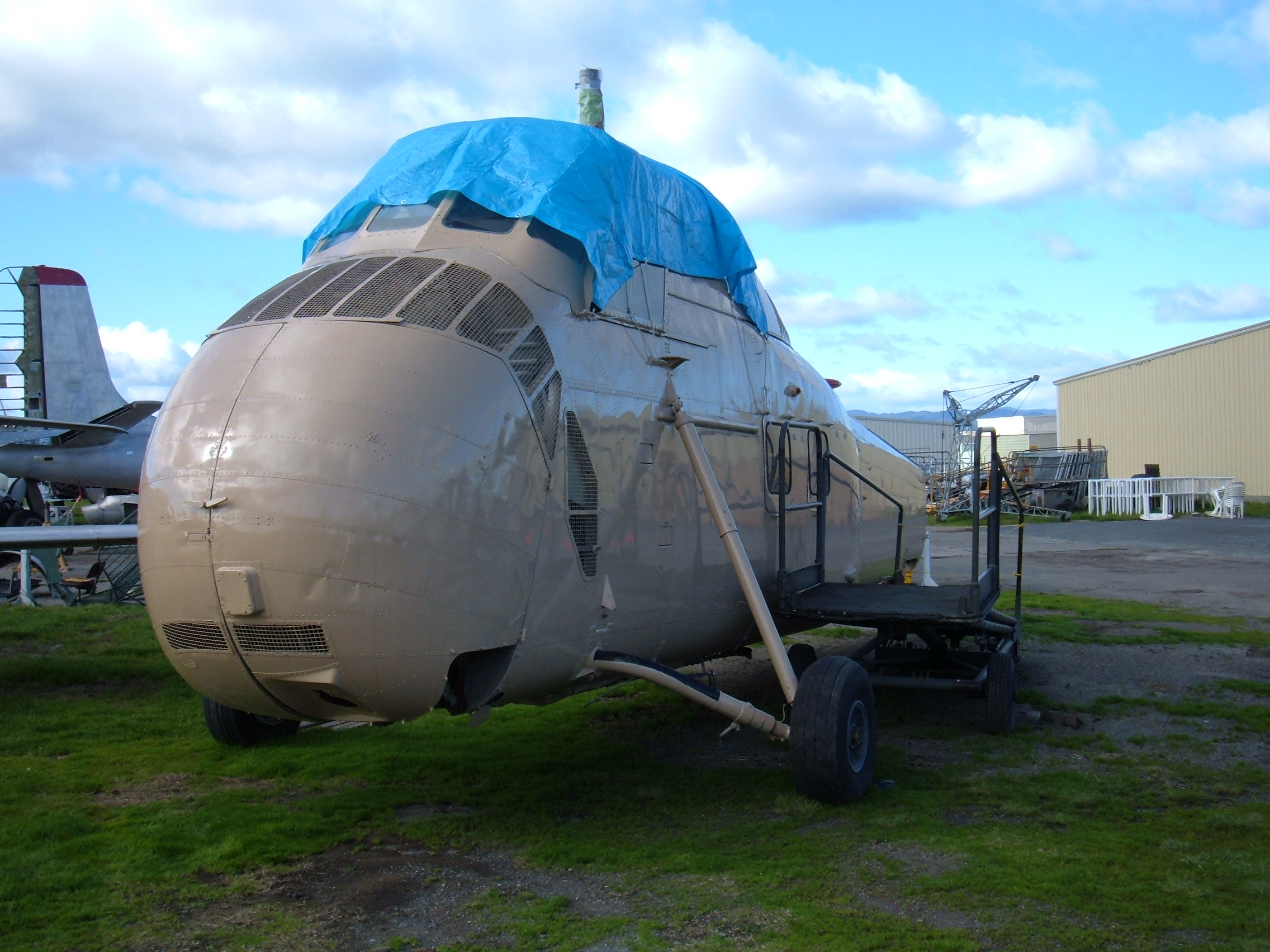
H-34 at Pacific Coast Air Museum, in California, USA

- 138460 – UH-34D on static display at the Evergreen Aviation & Space Museum in McMinnville, Oregon.
- 143937 – UH-34D on static display at the Estrella Warbirds Museum in Paso Robles, California.
- 143939 – H-34A on static display at the USS Midway Museum in San Diego, California.
- 145694 – UH-34J on static display at the Wings of Freedom Aviation Museum in Horsham, Pennsylvania. This airframe was built in October 1958 and restored in April 1995.
- 145717 – LH-34D on static display at the New England Air Museum in Windsor Locks, Connecticut.
- 145728 – HUS-1A on static display at the Stinson Chapter of the Texas Air Museum in San Antonio, Texas.
- 147171 – UH-34D on static display in the Vietnam display next to USS Yorktown at the Patriots Point Naval & Maritime Museum in Charleston, South Carolina.
- 147173 – UH-34D in storage at the Connecticut Air & Space Center in Stratford, Connecticut.
- 147191 – VH-34D is on static display at the New River Aviation Memorial at the front gate of Marine Corps Air Station New River in Jacksonville, North Carolina. This airframe was the last flying US Marine Corps H-34 in 1973.
- 148002 – SH-34J on static display at the Pueblo Weisbrod Aircraft Museum in Pueblo, Colorado.
- 148764 – UH-34D on static display at Naval Air Station Joint Reserve Base Fort Worth (former Carswell AFB) near Fort Worth, Texas.
- 148768 – UH-34D on static display at the American Helicopter Museum & Education Center in West Chester, Pennsylvania
- 148963 – HH-34J on static display at the Pacific Aviation Museum in Honolulu, Hawaii.
- 150213 – UH-34D on static display at Fort Worth Aviation Museum in Fort Worth, Texas. Previously at Cavanaugh Flight Museum.
- 150219 – UH-34D on static display at the Flying Leatherneck Aviation Museum in San Diego, California.
- 150227 – UH-34D on static display at the National Naval Aviation Museum at Naval Air Station Pensacola, Florida.
- 150255 – UH-34D on static display at the Wings and Rotors Air Museum in Murrieta, California.
- 150553 – UH-34D on static display at the USS Hornet Museum at the former Naval Air Station Alameda in Alameda, California. This airframe entered service in August 1963 and was donated to the museum in 2003 by the Pima Air and Space Museum.
- 150570 – UH-34D on static display at the National Museum of the Marine Corps in Triangle, Virginia.
- 154895 – UH-34D on static display at the Palm Springs Air Museum in Palm Springs, California.
- 53-4477 – CH-34G on static display at the Air Force Flight Test Center Museum at Edwards Air Force base in Edwards, California.
- 53-4526 – CH-34A in storage at the United States Army Aviation Museum near Daleville, Alabama.
- 53-4544 – CH-34C on static display at the Camp San Luis Obispo Museum and Historical Site in San Luis Obispo, California.
- 54-0914 – CH-34C on static display at the Russell Military Museum in Zion, Illinois.
- 55-4496 – CH-34C in storage at the Carolinas Aviation Museum in Charlotte, North Carolina. This airframe was previously on display at the Florence Air & Missile Museum in Florence, South Carolina.
- 56-4320 – VH-34C on static display at the United States Army Aviation Museum near Daleville, Alabama.
- 57-1684 – VH-34C on static display at the Pima Air and Space Museum adjacent to Davis-Monthan Air Force Base in Tucson, Arizona.
- 57-1698 – CH-34A on static display at the Allegheny Arms & Armor Museum in Smethport, Pennsylvania. This airframe was previously on display at the Intrepid Sea, Air & Space Museum in New York, New York.
- 57-1705 – CH-34C on static display at Travis Air Force Base near Fairfield, California.
- 57-1708 – CH-34C on static display at the Pacific Coast Air Museum in Santa Rosa, California.
- 57-1725 – VH-34C on static display at the U.S. Army Transportation Museum near Newport News, Virginia.

== Specifications (H-34 Choctaw) ==

Data from Jane's All the World's Aircraft 1958-59

General characteristics

- Crew: 2
- Capacity: 12 troops (H-34A) / 18 troops (H-34C) / 8 stretchers
- Length: 47 ft 2 in (14.38 m) fuselage

56 ft 8.5 in (17 m) rotors turning

- Height: 14 ft 3.5 in (4.356 m)
- Empty weight: 7,646 lb (3,468 kg)
- Gross weight: 11,867 lb (5,383 kg)
- Max takeoff weight: 13,300 lb (6,033 kg)
- Fuel capacity: 198–307 US gal (165–256 imp gal; 750–1,160 L)
- Powerplant: 1 × Wright R-1820-84 Cyclone , 1,525 hp (1,137 kW) for take-off

1,275 hp (951 kW) METO for 5 minutes

- Main rotor diameter: 56 ft 0 in (17.07 m)
- Main rotor area: 2,463 sq ft (228.8 m^{2}) *Blade section: – NACA 0012

Performance

- Maximum speed: 122 mph (196 km/h, 106 kn)
- Cruise speed: 97 mph (156 km/h, 84 kn)
- Range: 190 mi (310 km, 170 nmi)
- Service ceiling: 12,000 ft (3,700 m)
- Hover ceiling IGE: 9,600 ft (2,926 m) (H-34A)
- Hover ceiling OGE: 5,500 ft (1,676 m) (H-34A)
- Rate of climb: 1,500 ft/min (7.6 m/s) at sea level
- Vertical rate of climb: 600 ft/min (3.05 m/s) at sea level

Armament

== See also ==
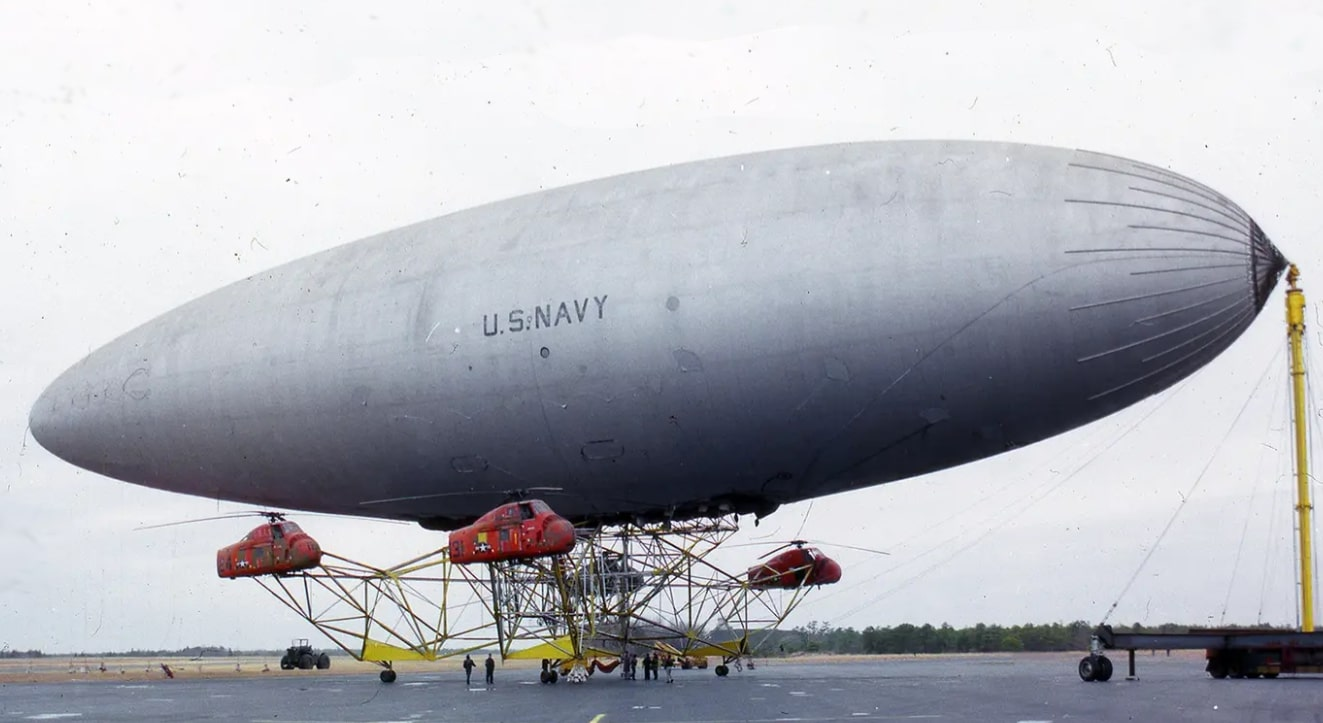
The ill-fated Piasecki PA-97, which combined four modified H-34s with a blimp

Related development

- Piasecki PA-97
- Sikorsky H-19 Chickasaw
- Westland Wessex

Aircraft of comparable role, configuration, and era

- Mil Mi-4

Related lists

- List of civil aircraft
- List of military aircraft of the United States
- List of rotorcraft

== Bibliography ==
- Apostolo, Giorgio. The Illustrated Encyclopedia of Helicopters. New York: Bonanza Books, 1984. ISBN 0-517-439352.
- Duke, R.A. Helicopter Operations in Algeria [Translated French]. Washington, D.C.: Dept. of the Army, 1959.
- Elliot, Bryn (March–April 1997). "Bears in the Air: The US Air Police Perspective". Air Enthusiast. No. 68. pp. 46–51. ISSN 0143-5450.
- Fails, William R. Marines & Helicopters, 1962–1973. Darby, Pennsylvania: Diane Publishing, 1995. ISBN 0-7881-1818-8.
- Griffin, John A. Canadian Military Aircraft Serials & Photographs 1920–1968. Ottawa, Ontario, Canada: Queen's Printer, Publication No. 69-2, 1969.
- Gunston, Bill. An Illustrated Guide To the Israeli Air Force. London: Salamander Books, 1982. ISBN 978-0-668-05506-2.
- Leuliette, Pierre. St. Michael and the Dragon: Memoirs of a Paratrooper, New York: Houghton Mifflin, 1964.
- Mesko, Jim: Airmobile: The Helicopter War in Vietnam. Carollton, Texas: Squadron/Signal Publications, 1984. ISBN 0-89747-159-8.
- Riley, David. "French Helicopter Operations in Algeria." Marine Corps Gazette, February 1958, pp. 21–26.
- Shrader, Charles R. The First Helicopter War: Logistics and Mobility in Algeria, 1954–1962. Westport, Connecticut: Praeger Publishers, 1999. ISBN 0-275-96388-8.
- Spenser, Jay P. Whirlybirds: A History of the U.S. Helicopter Pioneers. Seattle, Washington: University of Washington Press, 1998. ISBN 0-295-97699-3.
