= Powhatan Apartments =

Apartment building in Chicago, Illinois

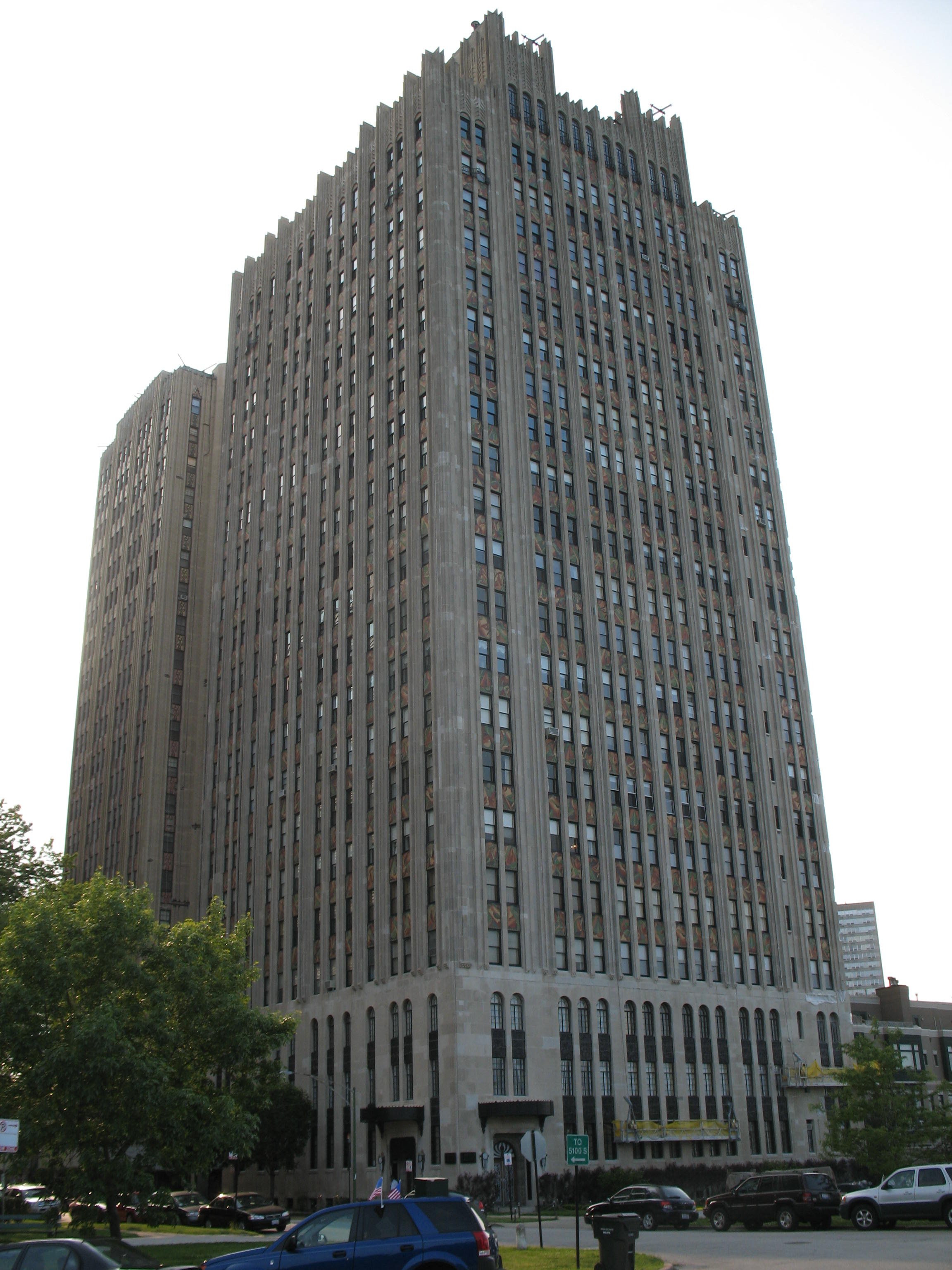
- May 28, 2007 (Memorial Day)
- Interactive map of the Powhatan Apartments area

General information
- Location: 4950 S. Chicago Beach Dr. Chicago, Illinois
- Coordinates: 41.8046°N 87.5843°W
- Construction started: 1927
- Completed: 1929

Height
- Roof: 270 feet (82 m)

Technical details
- Floor count: 22

Design and construction
- Architect: Charles Morgan

Chicago Landmark
- Designated: January 12, 1993

The Powhatan or Powhatan Apartments is a 22-story luxury apartment building overlooking Lake Michigan and adjacent to Burnham Park in the Kenwood neighborhood of Chicago, Illinois. The building was designed by architects Robert De Golyer and Charles L. Morgan. Much of the Art Deco detailing is attributed to Morgan who was associated with Frank Lloyd Wright. The exterior of the luxury-apartment highrise reflects Eliel Saarinen's second place design for the Tribune Tower competition of 1922. The building's terra-cotta ornamental panels feature conventionalized scenes based upon Native American culture.

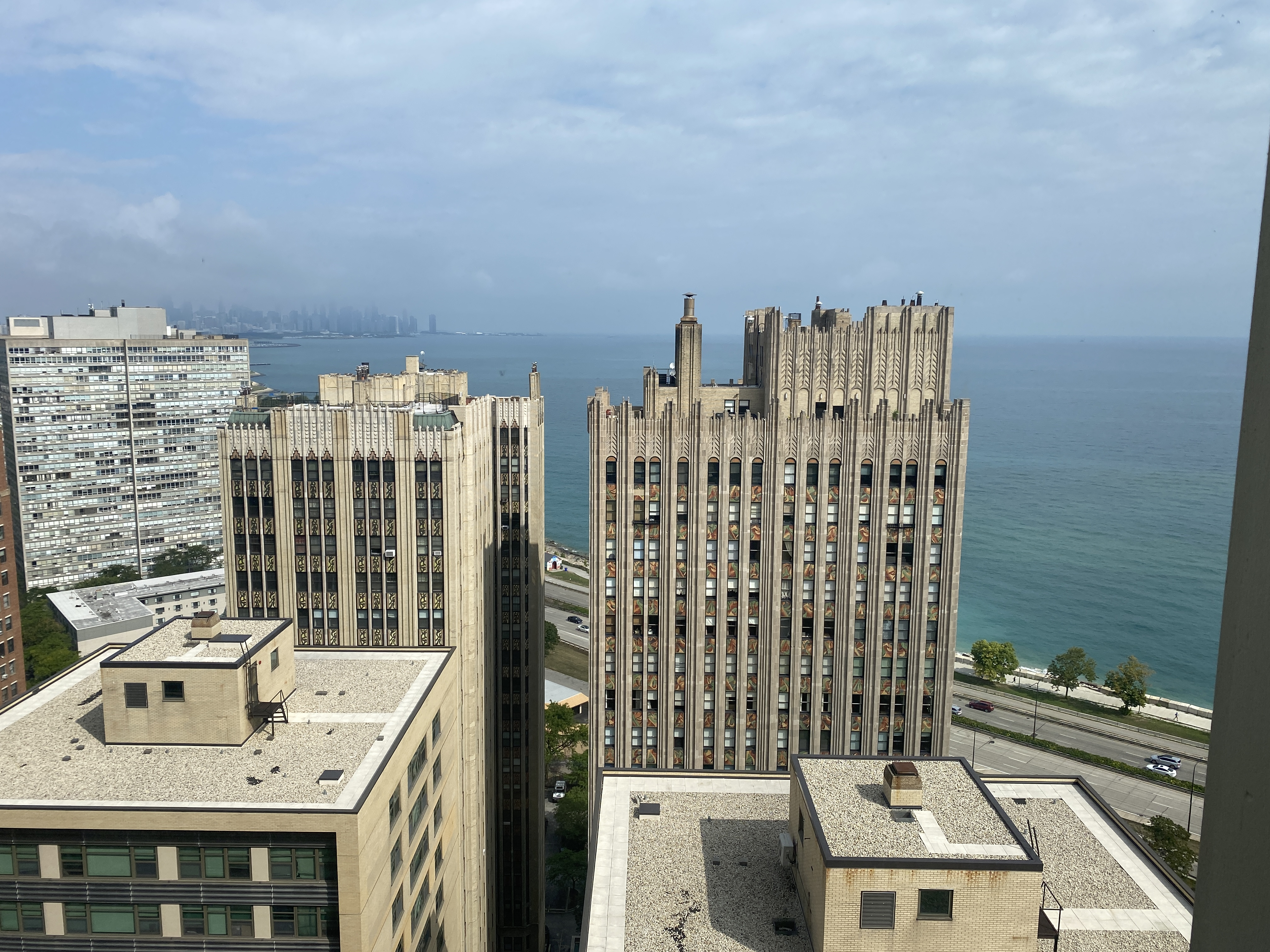
the roofs of The Narragansett (left) and Powhatan Apartments (right) from Regents Park

This housing cooperative is a residential high-rise on Chicago's South Side. The building also hosts the only 24-hour elevator operators in Chicago. Since it and many of the neighboring high-rise apartment buildings are named for Native American tribes (such as the Algonquin, The Chippewa and the Narragansett), the area has been given the tongue-in-cheek name "Indian Village". It was designated a Chicago Landmark on January 12, 1993.
