= Indian Village, Chicago =

Coordinates: 41.8043°N 87.5855°W

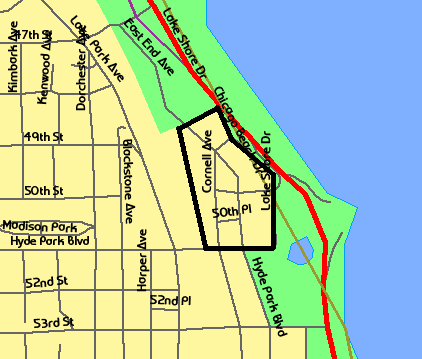
Approximate boundaries of Indian Village

Indian Village is the small southeast corner of Kenwood, a community area on the South Side of Chicago, Illinois, United States. It is bounded by Lake Shore Drive to the east, Burnham Park to the north, 51st Street (signed locally as East Hyde Park Boulevard) to the south, Harold Washington Park to the southeast, and the Illinois Central Railroad tracks used by the South Shore and Metra Electric District lines to the west. Many of the buildings in the neighborhood are named after American Indian tribes including the National Register of Historic Places (NRHP)-designated Narragansett; the Chicago Landmark Powhatan Apartments, the Chippewa, and the Algonquin.

== Details ==
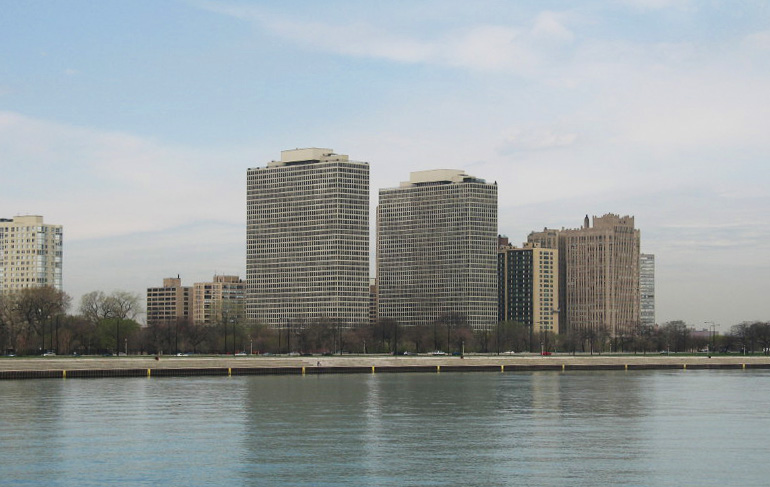
Indian Village high rises, including Regents Park and Powhatan Apartments, from Promontory Point

The NRHP site of the former Chicago Beach Hotel that now hosts Regents Park is also in the neighborhood. The new location of the Hyde Park Art Center at 5020 S. Cornell Avenue is in this neighborhood. Carol Moseley Braun, former United States Senator and former 2004 Democratic Party Presidential Candidate, once lived in the 5000 East End Building, which was the tallest building on the South Side of Chicago until 1965. The neighborhood hosts the Powhatan Apartments, the only 24-hour elevator operator building in Chicago. Regents Park's South Tower is the tallest building in the Kenwood community area. Ludwig Mies van der Rohe designed the Algonquin Apartments, which are a set of six identical 14-story towers in the neighborhood, and the nearby Chippewa Cooperative Apartments. When the developer altered these projects' glass-enclosed lobby design, Mies asked that his name be dissociated from both. In 1951, they were completed along with the adjacent Twin Towers Apartments, which originally housed U.S. Army personnel at the Fifth Army Headquarters.
