= The Narragansett (Chicago) =

Apartment building in Chicago, Illinois

- U.S. National Register of Historic Places
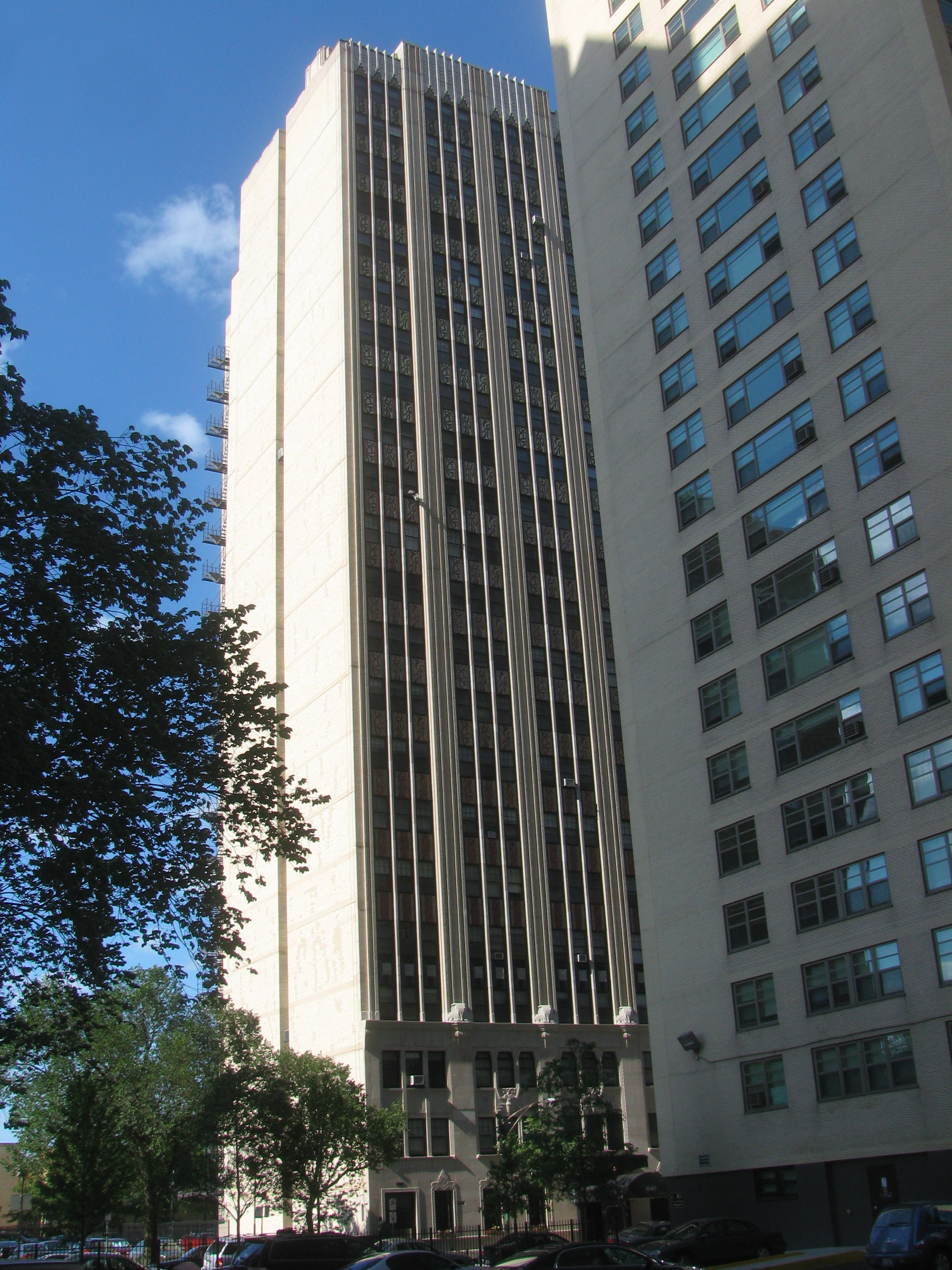

- Location within Chicago metropolitan area Location within Illinois Location within the United States
- Location: 1640 E. 50th St., Chicago, Illinois
- Coordinates: 41°48′16″N 87°35′05″W
- Area: less than one acre
- Built: 1928
- Architect: Leichenko and Esser
- Architectural style: Art Deco
- NRHP reference No.: 05000107
- Added to NRHP: April 18, 2005

The Narragansett is a historic apartment building at 1640 E. 50th Street in the Kenwood neighborhood of Chicago, Illinois. The building was built in 1928 at the peak of apartment construction in Chicago, as apartments had grown in popularity throughout the early 20th century. It was one of several apartments built in the Chicago Beach Development, a lakefront property that was developed into a fashionable neighborhood known as Indian Village. Architects Leichenko and Esser designed the Art Deco building. The 22-story building features brick piers spanning its entire height, terra cotta spandrels dividing each floor, and decorative limestone on the first three floors.

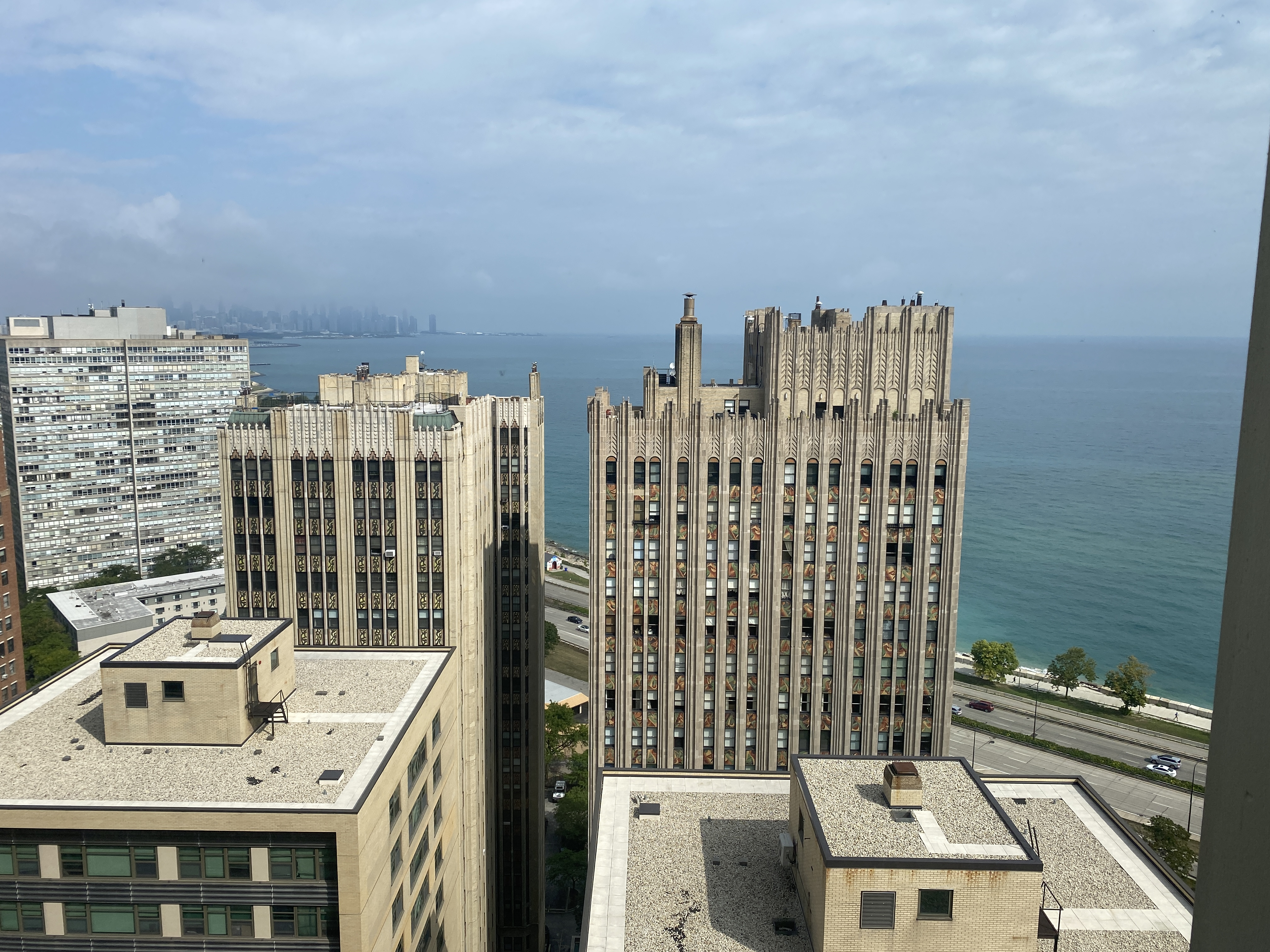
the roofs of The Narragansett (left) and Powhatan Apartments (right) from Regents Park

The building was added to the National Register of Historic Places on April 18, 2005.
