= Chicago Beach Hotel =

Resort hotel in Chicago, Illinois, US

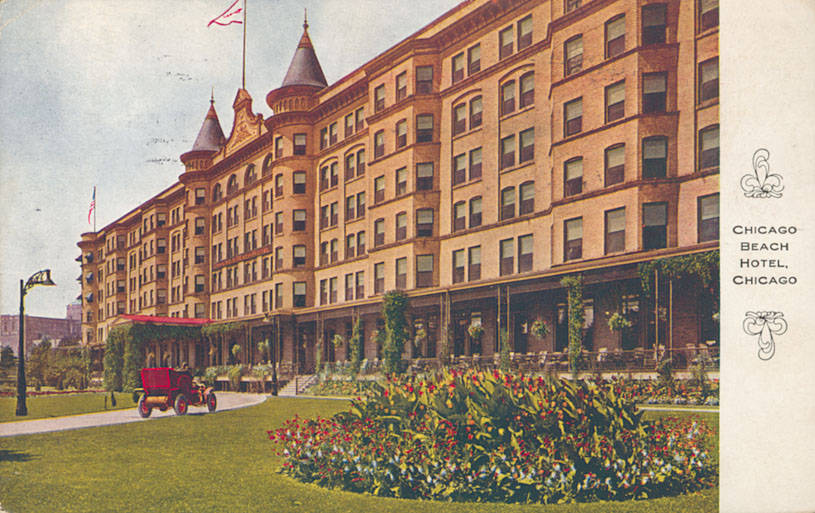
- Interactive map of the Chicago Beach Hotel area

General information
- Completed: 1891
- Closed: 1963
- Demolished: 1970

Design and construction
- Architect: Warren Leland

The Chicago Beach Hotel was a luxury resort hotel located at 1660 East Hyde Park Boulevard in the Indian Village neighborhood of the Kenwood community area of Chicago, Illinois, United States.

== History ==
The hotel was built in 1892 by Warren Leland and was one of many speculative hotels built to accommodate the hordes of tourists drawn by the upcoming Columbian Exposition of 1893. It contained 450 rooms, with 175 bathrooms. The property extended to Lake Michigan. The building resembled the Hyde Park Hotel and probably shared architects. Many Chicagoans of high social standing became residents and members. The building had private access to the beach until 1915 when the city created an adjacent bathhouse. It lost its beach frontage entirely in 1920 when the shoreline was moved more than a block eastward with a landfill project that created South Lake Shore Drive.

In 1921 a huge 12-story, 545-room addition was constructed on the eastern portion of the property. The original structure, by now outdated, was then demolished in 1927. The Algonquin Apartments, designed by Ludwig Mies van der Rohe, were built on the site of the original wing in 1950.

== Gardiner General Hospital ==
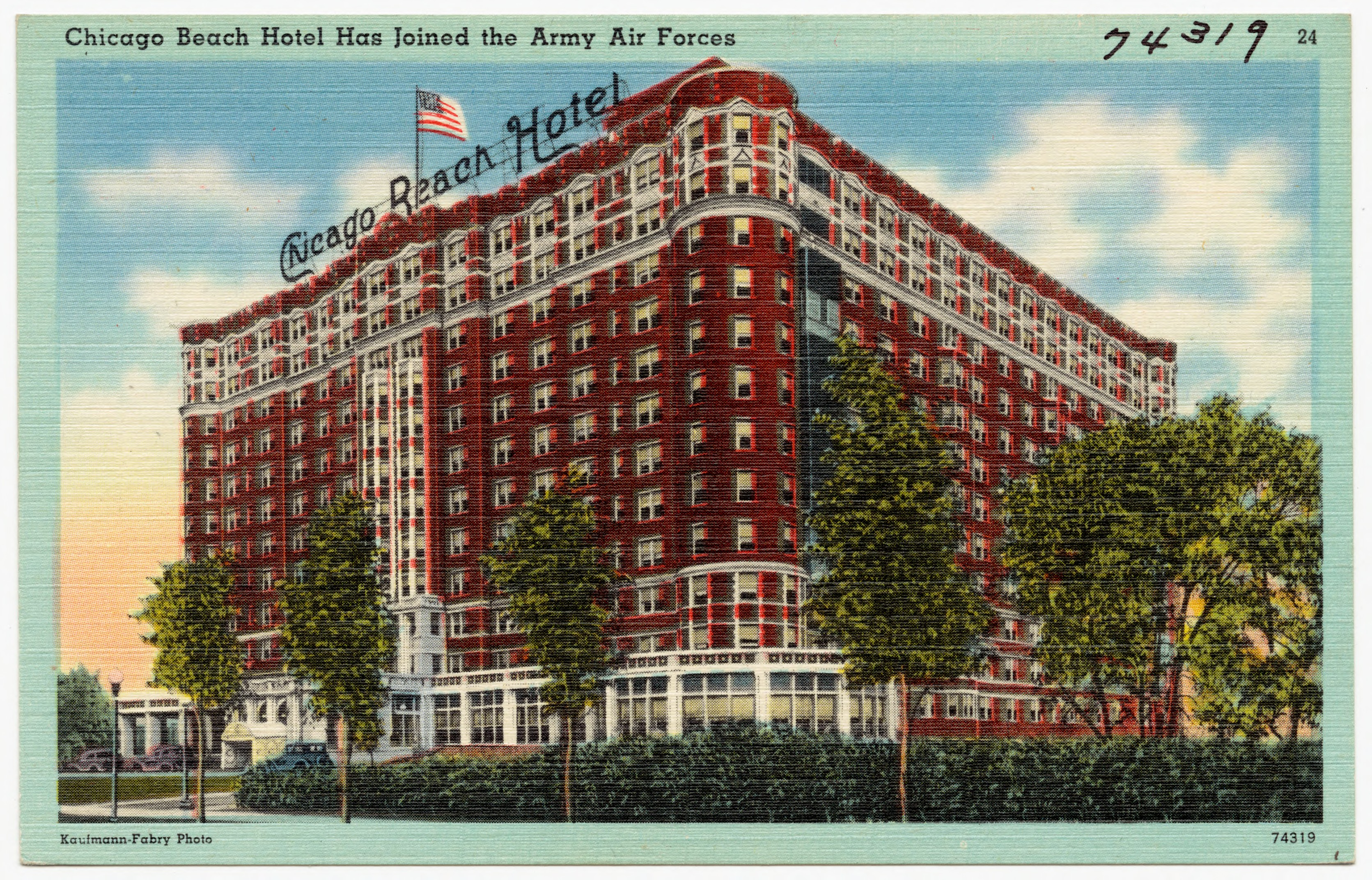
Chicago Beach Hotel, 1943

The hotel closed in October 1942. On October 15, the new wing of the hotel was commandeered by the military, reopening on December 21 as Gardiner General Hospital, named after Ruth M. Gardiner. After the war the building served as the 5th Army Headquarters. Fifth Army Headquarters moved to Fort Sheridan in 1967, leaving the building vacant until its demolition in 1970. The Regents Park apartments were constructed on the property in the 1970s.
