= South Shore Cultural Center =

- South Shore Country Club
- U.S. National Register of Historic Places
- Chicago Landmark
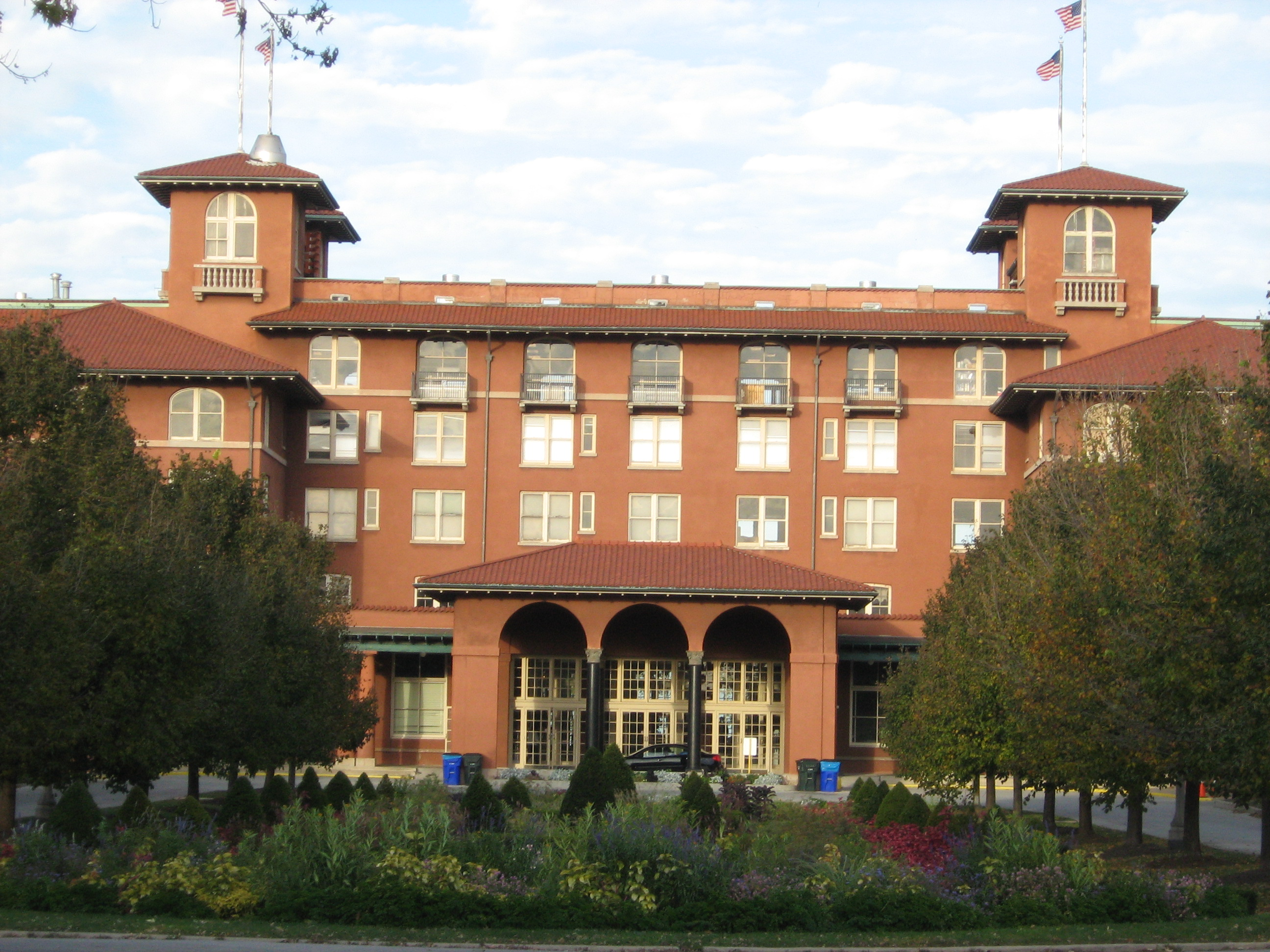
- South Shore Country Club

- Location within Chicago metropolitan area Location within Illinois Location within the United States
- Location: 7059 S. South Shore Dr. Chicago, Illinois
- Coordinates: 41°46′11″N 87°33′46″W
- Area: Chicago
- Built: 1906, 1909, 1916
- Architect: Marshall & Fox
- Architectural style: Mediterranean Revival
- NRHP reference No.: 75000652

Significant dates
- Added to NRHP: March 4, 1975
- Designated CHICL: May 26, 2004

The South Shore Cultural Center, in Chicago, Illinois, United States, is a cultural facility located at 71st Street and South Shore Drive, in the city's South Shore neighborhood. It encompasses the club facility, grounds, and beach of the former South Shore Country Club, which in the 1970s became part of the public Chicago Park District.

== History ==
The South Shore Country Club was founded in 1905 as a suburban counterpart to the urban clubs of Chicago, such as the Athletic Club. The original building was built at that time, designed by architects Marshall and Fox in a Mediterranean Revival style. In 1909, a theater was added, but in 1916, Marshall and Fox were engaged to design a newer building, still in the Mediterranean Revival style. This is the building that still stands. Originally built as a Protestant-only club, later, Irish-Catholics were admitted.

Besides the main clubhouse, the Country Club also had stables, a nine-hole golf course, tennis courts, a bowling green, and a private beach on Lake Michigan.

By the early 1960s, the character of the neighborhood was changing rapidly. As Hyde Park, Woodlawn, and South Shore became racially integrated, the wealthy whites who formed the membership in the club started to leave the neighborhood in droves. In 1967, the club considered opening its membership to Jews (for the first time since the 1930s) and African Americans (for the first time ever). The decision at that time not to open membership accelerated the decline of the club; in 1973, the decision was made to liquidate its assets, and in 1975, the property was sold to the Chicago Park District for $9.775 million.

It was listed on the U.S. National Register of Historic Places in 1975.

A coalition of neighborhood activists and historic preservationists successfully convinced the Park District not to demolish the buildings. Instead, the facility was renamed the South Shore Cultural Center. Over two decades, the main buildings were slowly renovated and repurposed. Other buildings were torn down.

== Current use ==
Today the Cultural Center houses the South Shore Cultural Center School of the Arts (youth and teen programs, community art classes, the Paul Robeson Theatre, a Fine Art Gallery, two dance studios, music practice rooms, and a visual arts studio with a kiln). In addition, there are banquet facilities for rent for weddings, receptions, and meetings. The golf course is still in operation, and is open to the public, as are the beach, picnic areas, gardens, and a nature center. The horse stables are currently used by the Chicago Police Department's mounted unit. The building houses the Parrot Cage Restaurant, which is operated as a teaching program of the Washburne Culinary Institute. The Chicago Lakefront Trail (abbreviated as LFT) is an 18-mile multi-use path in Chicago, Illinois along the coast of Lake Michigan and runs past the center.

The center now competes with the Jackson Park 63rd Street Beach House and Promontory Point as South Side beachfront special use facilities in the Park District.

The building's exteriors were used as the "Palace Hotel Ballroom" in The Blues Brothers. The Cultural Center was the site of Barack and Michelle Obama's wedding reception on October 3, 1992. On May 26, 2004, it became a Chicago Landmark.

== Gallery ==
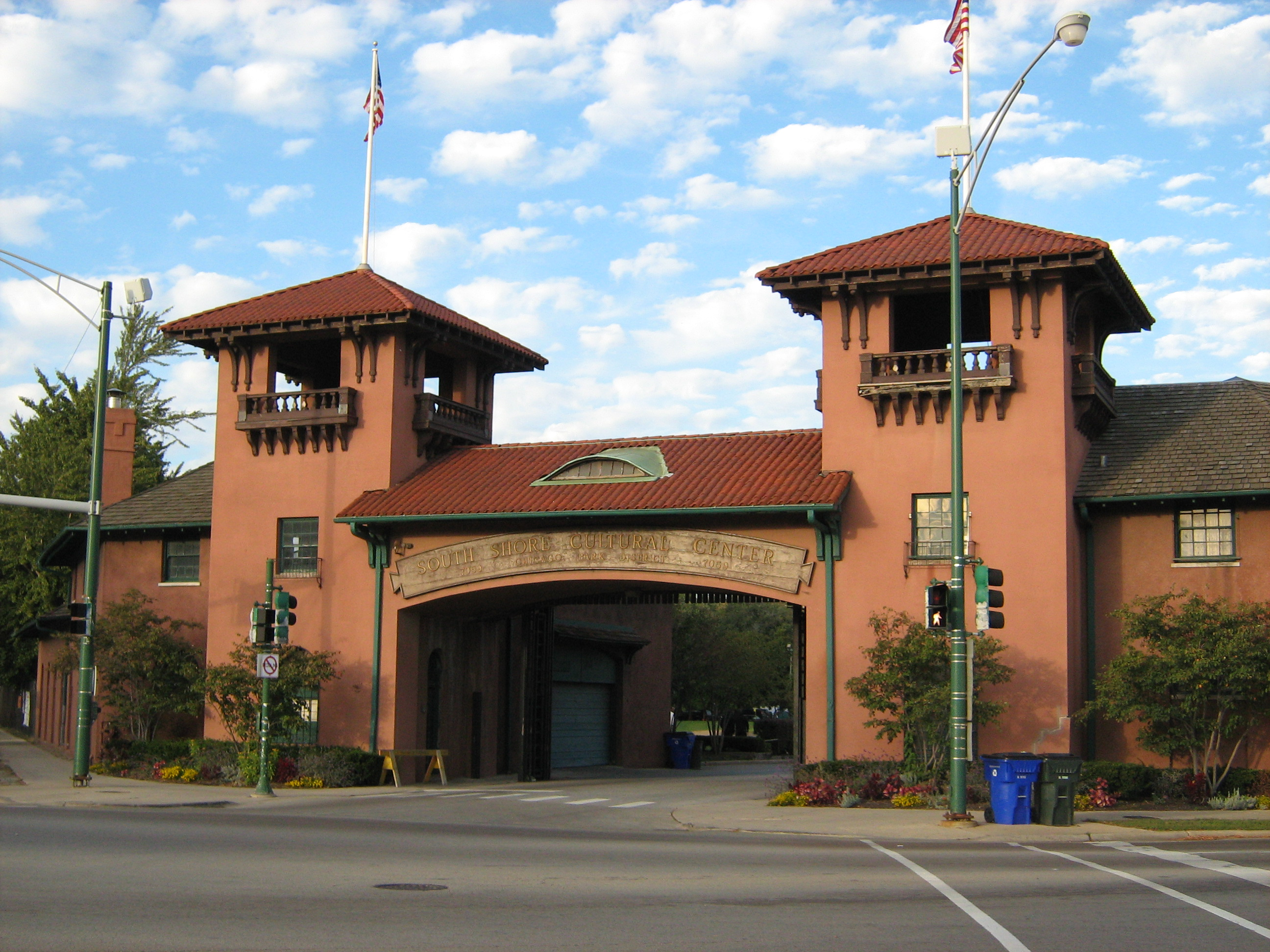
Entrance Gate to the South Shore Cultural Center

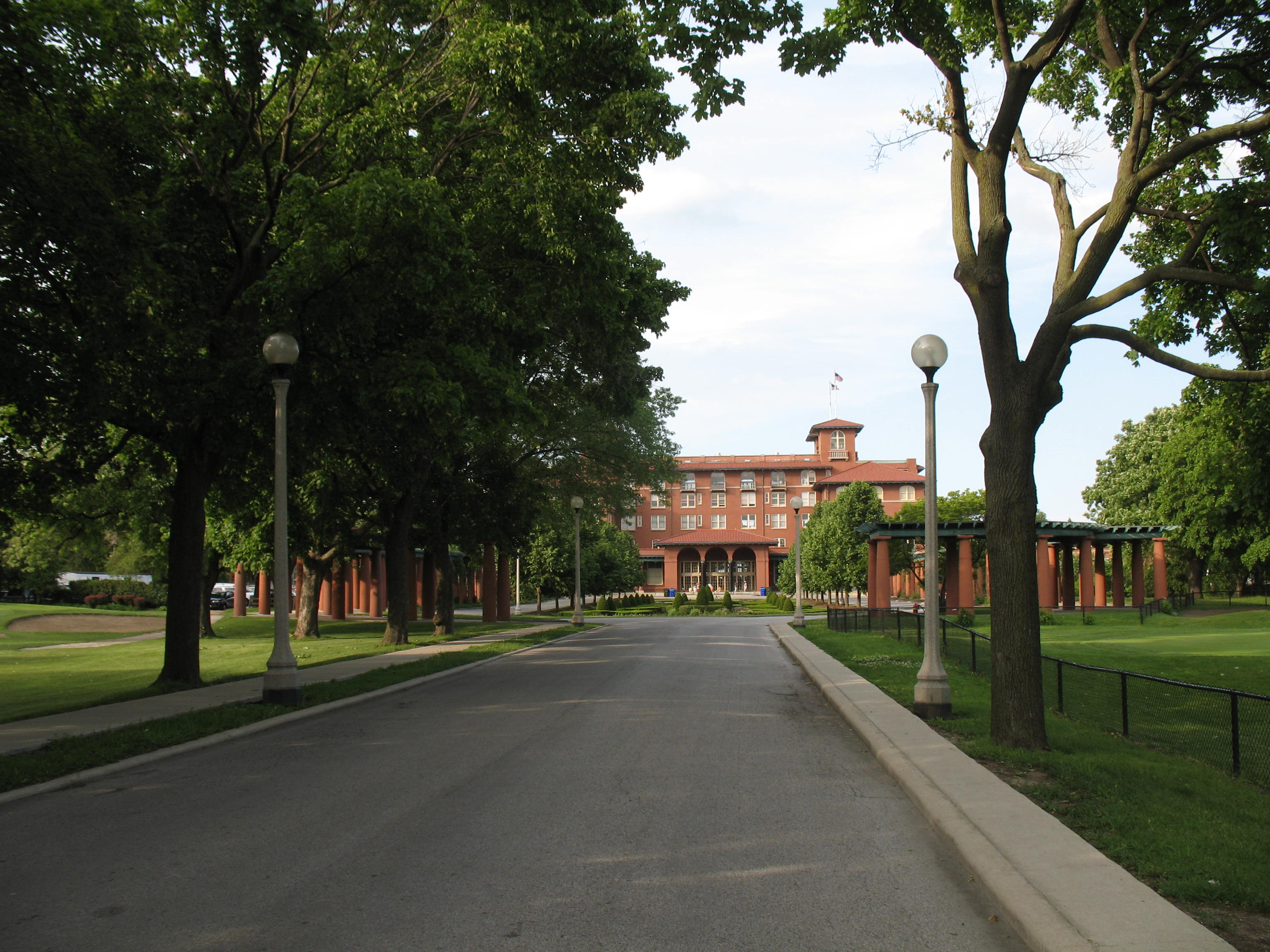
Driveway leading to South Shore Cultural Center

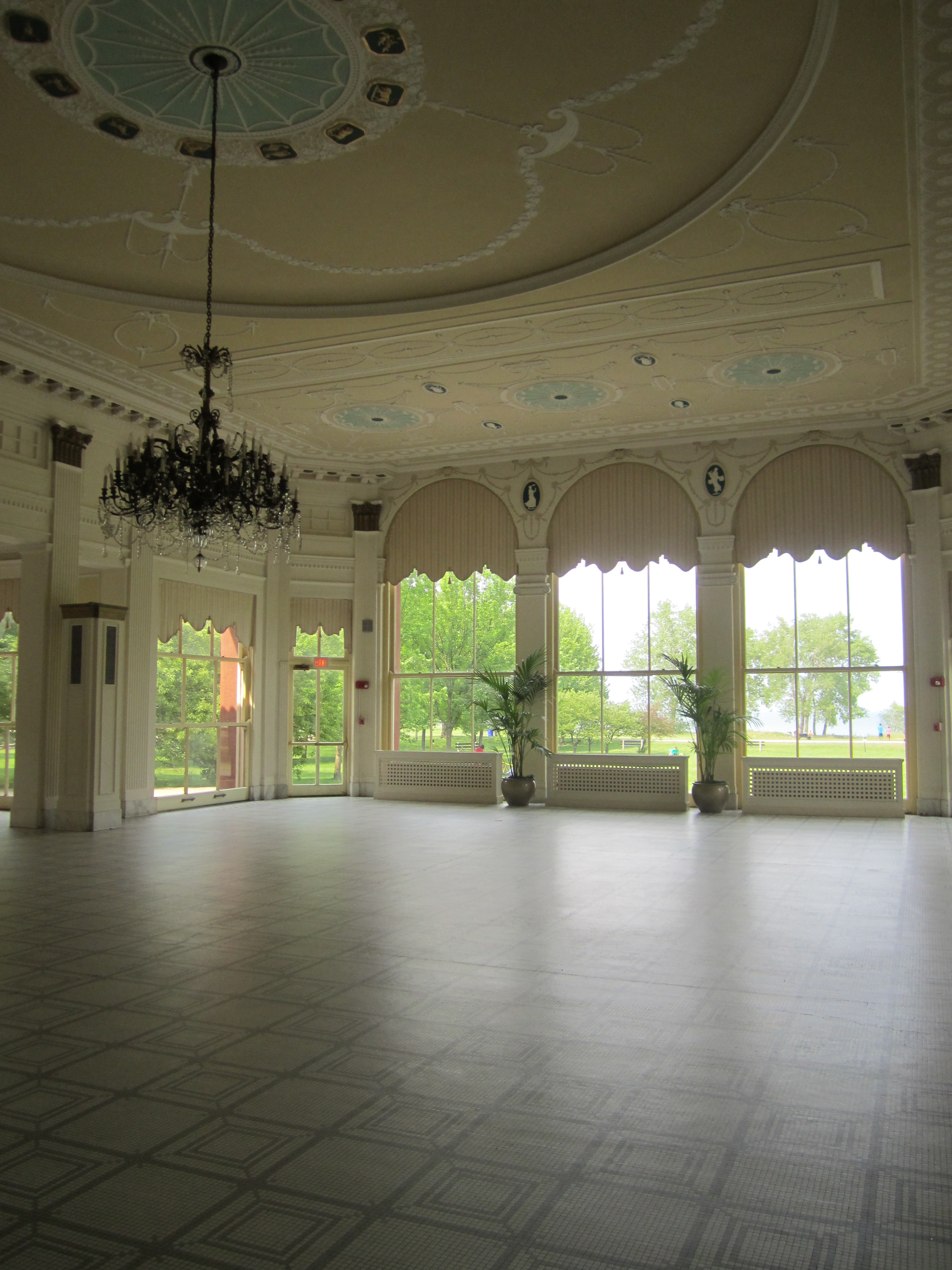
Interior ballroom at the South Shore Cultural Center

== Reading list ==
http://www.chicagotribune.com/news/opinion/commentary/ct-south-shore-country-club-flashback-perspec-1023-jm-20161019-story.html
