= Regents Park (Chicago) =

Apartment complex in Chicago, Illinois

Regents Park (North and South Towers)
- Regents Park from the southwest in 2021
- Interactive map of the Regents Park (North and South Towers) area

General information
- Status: Completed
- Location: Chicago, United States
- Coordinates: 41°48′12″N 87°35′5.4″W
- Completed: South tower: 1972; North tower: 1974
- Owner: Antheus Capital

Height
- Roof: South tower: 110 m (360 ft); North tower: 104 m (341 ft)

Technical details
- Floor count: South tower: 37; North tower: 36
- Floor area: South tower: 57,720 m^{2} (621,293 sq ft); North tower: 55,554 m^{2} (597,978 sq ft)
- Lifts/elevators: 5 (both)

Design and construction
- Architect: Dubin, Dubin, Black & Moutoussamy

Regents Park is a 1,026 unit apartment complex in the Indian Village section of the Kenwood community area of Chicago in Cook County, Illinois, United States, and adjacent to the Hyde Park community area border. Bordering Harold Washington Park, its two parallel towers are just west of Lake Shore Drive, Burnham Park and Lake Michigan with clear park and lake views to the east and south. The 37 floor Regents Park South Tower was completed in 1972 and the 36 floor Regents Park North Tower was completed in 1974. The South Tower is the tallest building in Kenwood, and overlooks Lake Michigan and Burnham Park to the east and Harold Washington Park to the south.

== Description ==
Regents Park

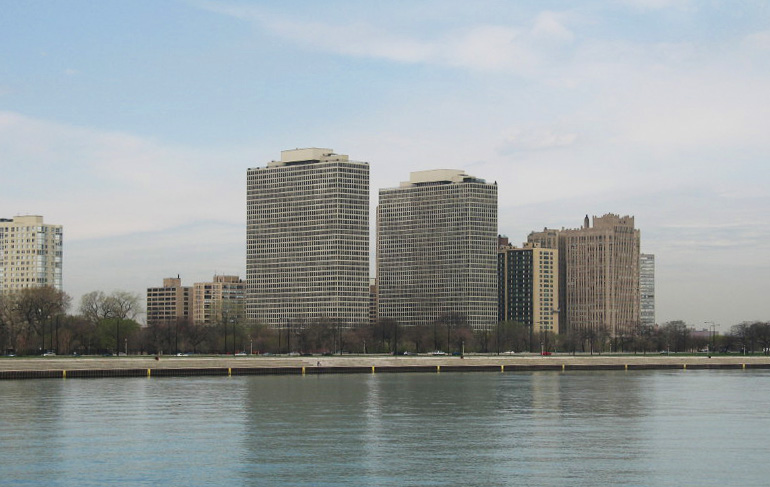
from Promontory Point in Burnham Park across Lake Michigan, 2007

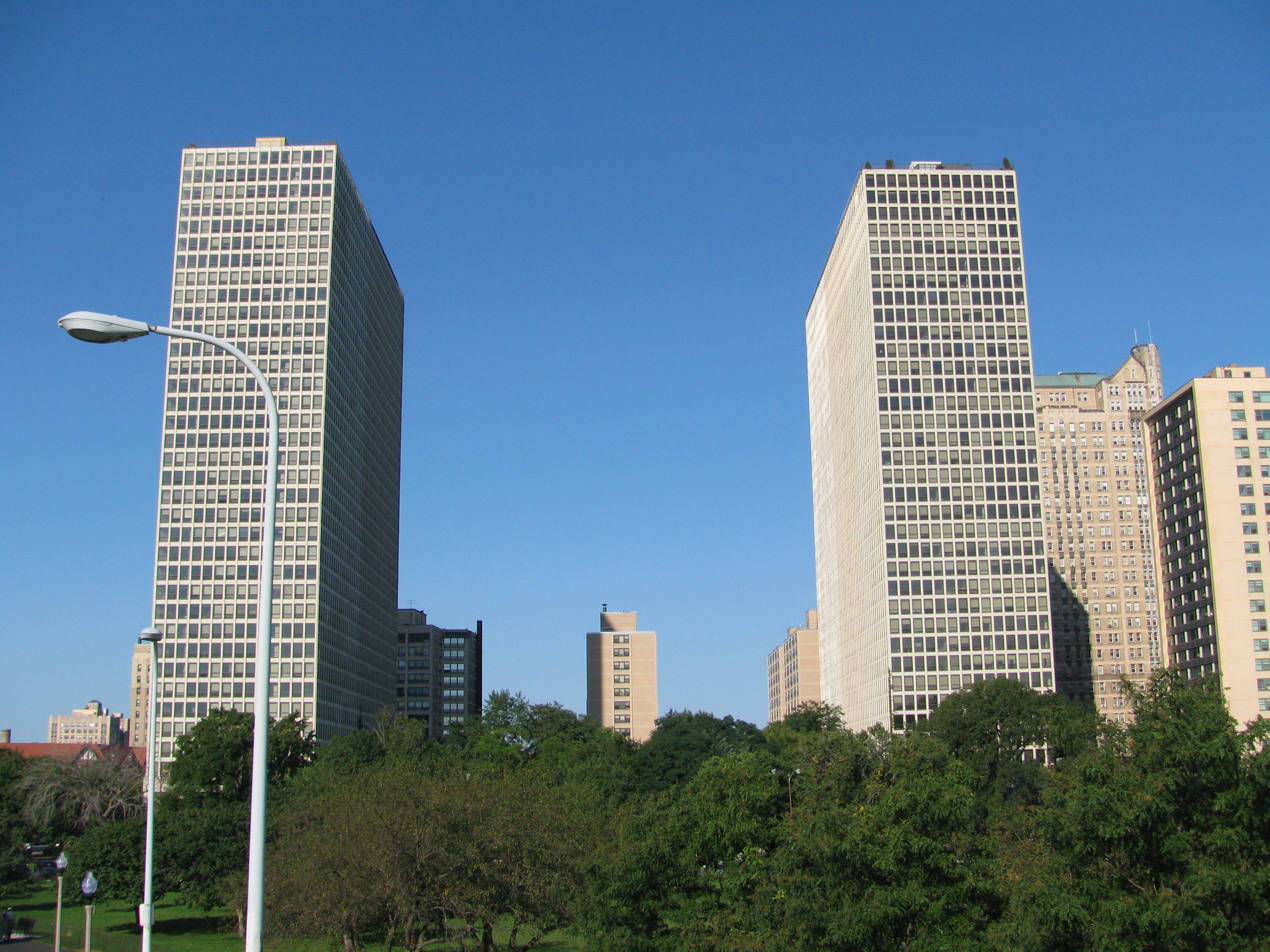
from Lake Shore Drive 51st Street walkover, 2007

The complex is located on the site of the former Chicago Beach Hotel, a 12-story resort built in 1921 which had been used since World War II as the 5th Army Headquarters. The South Tower is located on the site of the former hotel and the North Tower is built on the site of the north lawn of the Hotel.

The buildings fell into disrepair soon after their construction in the early to mid-1970s, and by the mid-1970s, they were known for their slum-like conditions, rising violence (including murder), and high vacancy rates. HUD had taken control of the buildings. In 1981, developer Bruce Clinton and The Clinton Company bought the property from HUD, as an agreement had been made earlier with HUD to acquire the property after managing, renovating, and improving the property over five years. The renovations and improvements continued to progress after the acquisition, and Clinton eventually won the support of Senator Carol Moseley-Braun, U.S. Rep. Bobby Rush, Mayor Richard M. Daley, University of Chicago law school dean Douglas Baird, and University of Chicago Vice President of Community Affairs Jonathan Kleinbard. The University had previously advocated the demolition of the slums, but its position had changed as it witnessed Clinton's redevelopment successes. In 2002, the U of C-funded South East Chicago Commission honored Clinton for his contributions to the Hyde Park-Kenwood community. Regents Park was sold in 2005 to Crescent Heights and again in 2011 to Antheus Capital.

The original main entrance was on the east side of the building. The towers used to have a Lake Shore Drive addresses (5020 & 5050 South Lake Shore Dr.) although the main entrance is now on the west side of the building and the official address has since been changed to 5035 S. East End. The towers were renovated in approximately 1990. A significant proportion of the residents attend the University of Chicago.

United States President Barack Obama used to work out in the building's fitness center, although he was never a resident, which called into question some of the building's policies.

== Awards ==
The buildings have been the recipient of numerous apartment industry awards including the Mayor’s Landscape Award, and the 2006 National Association of Homebuilders Multi-family Development Firm of the Year Award.
