= Kenwood, Chicago =

Community area in Chicago, Illinois

Kenwood
- Community area
- Community Area 39 - Kenwood
- Obama Family Home

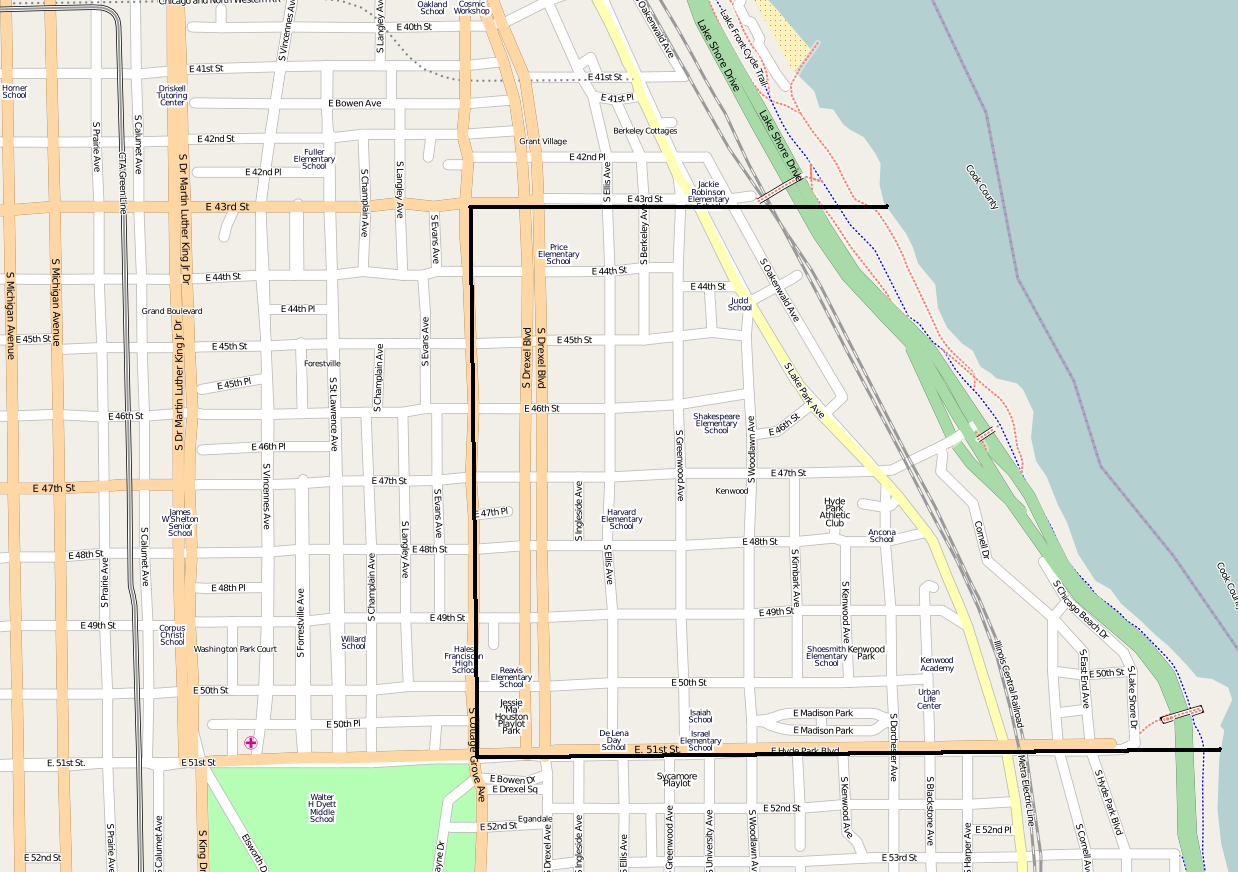
- Streetmap

- Location within the city of Chicago
- Coordinates: 41°48.6′N 87°36.0′W
- Country: United States
- State: Illinois
- County: Cook
- City: Chicago
- Neighborhoods: List: Kenwood; North Kenwood; East Hyde Park; Indian Village

Area
  - Total: 1.09 sq mi (2.82 km^{2})

Population (2024)
  - Total: 18,417
  - Density: 16,900/sq mi (6,530/km^{2})

Demographics 2024
  - White: 20.4%
  - Black: 63.0%
  - Hispanic: 3.5%
  - Asian: 5.7%
  - Other: 7.5%

Educational Attainment 2024
  - High School Diploma or Higher: 94.5%
  - Bachelor's Degree or Higher: 57.9%
- Time zone: UTC-6 (CST)
  - Summer (DST): UTC-5 (CDT)
- ZIP Codes: parts of 60615 and 60653
- Median household income 2020: $52,336
- Source: U.S. Census, Record Information Services

Kenwood is one of the 77 community areas of Chicago in Illinois, United States. It is on the shore of Lake Michigan on the South Side of the city.

Its boundaries are 43rd Street, 51st Street, Cottage Grove Avenue, and the lake. Kenwood was originally part of Hyde Park Township, which was annexed to the city of Chicago in 1889. Kenwood was once one of Chicago's most affluent neighborhoods, and it still has some of the largest single-family homes in the city. It contains two Chicago Landmark districts, Kenwood and North Kenwood. A large part of the southern half of the community area is in the Hyde Park-Kenwood Historic District. In recent years, Kenwood has received national attention as the home of former U.S. President Barack Obama.

== Description ==
Kenwood was settled in the 1850s by wealthy Chicagoans seeking respite from the increasing congestion of the city. The first of these residents was John A. Kennicott, who built his home near the Illinois Central Railroad at 48th Street. He named the home Kenwood after his ancestral land in Scotland, and when the Illinois Central Railroad built a small depot near 47th Street, they named the station Kenwood as well. Shortly afterwards, the name Kenwood began to be applied to the whole area.

The southeastern portion of Kenwood contains the Indian Village neighborhood, which features the Chicago Landmark Powhatan Apartments and the National Register of Historic Places-recognized Narragansett Apartments. The 1902 Blackstone Library is another well-known landmark in the neighborhood. It continues to be part of the Chicago Public Library system. The recently reopened Hyde Park Art Center, located on Cornell Avenue just north of 51st Street and East Hyde Park Boulevard, is Chicago's oldest alternative exhibition space, with an on-site school and studio.

The Hyde Park community area is to the south of Kenwood and the southern half of Kenwood (south of 47th Street) is sometimes referred to as Hyde Park-Kenwood.

In the 1890s, the Kenwood Astrophysical Observatory, established by astronomer George Ellery Hale, was located in Kenwood close to the new (at that time) University of Chicago.

Historical population
Census	Pop.	Note	%±
1930	26,942		—
1940	29,611		9.9%
1950	35,705		20.6%
1960	41,533		16.3%
1970	26,890		−35.3%
1980	21,974		−18.3%
1990	18,178		−17.3%
2000	18,363		1.0%
2010	17,841		−2.8%
2020	19,116		7.1%

== Politics ==
As with much of the South Side, the Kenwood community area has supported the Democratic Party in national elections by vast margins. During the 2016 presidential election in particular, Kenwood cast 7,639 votes for Hillary Clinton and 251 votes for Donald Trump (94.19% to 3.09%). In the 2012 presidential election, Kenwood cast 8,712 votes for Barack Obama and 331 votes for Mitt Romney (95.63% to 3.63%).

== Schools ==
The public schools in Kenwood are Kenwood Academy, Canter Middle School, King College Prep High School, Ariel Community Academy, William C. Reavis Math and Science Specialty School and Beulah Shoesmith Elementary School. Private Schools in Kenwood include the Ancona Montessori School, Cambridge School of Chicago, Akiba-Schechter Jewish Day School, and Hales Franciscan High School.

== Notable residents ==
- Muhammad Ali
- Lerone Bennett, Jr.
- Barbara Bowman
- Marc Canter
- David "Honeyboy" Edwards
- Louis Farrakhan
- Hugo Friend
- Seymour Hersh, was raised at 835 East 47th Street.
- Valerie Jarrett
- Edward Levi
- Ann Marie Lipinski
- Roberta Martin, lived at 4901 S. Woodlawn Avenue.
- Gaston B. Means
- Carol Moseley Braun
- Elijah Muhammad
- Barack Obama
- Michelle Obama
- Mandy Patinkin
- Cindy Pritzker, member of the Pritzker family
- Maurice Rabb
- Julius Rosenwald
- Bill Veeck
- Muddy Waters

The infamous murderers Nathan Leopold and Richard Loeb, and their victim Bobby Franks, were all residents of Kenwood.

== Gallery ==
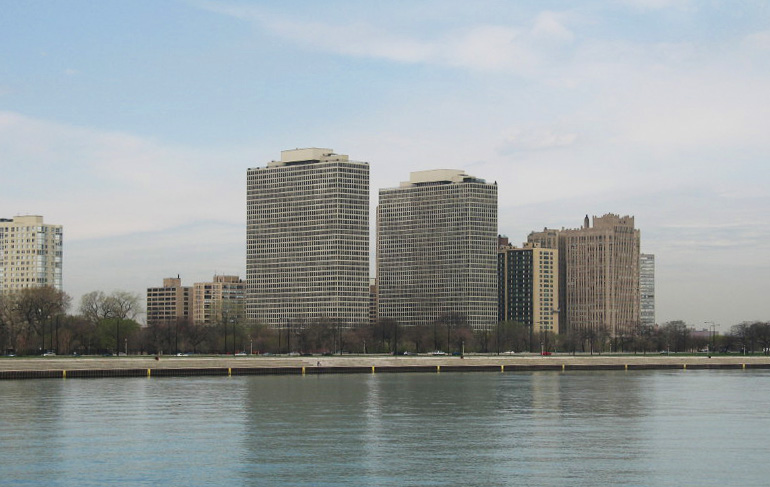
Lakefront condominiums in Kenwood as seen from Promontory Point.

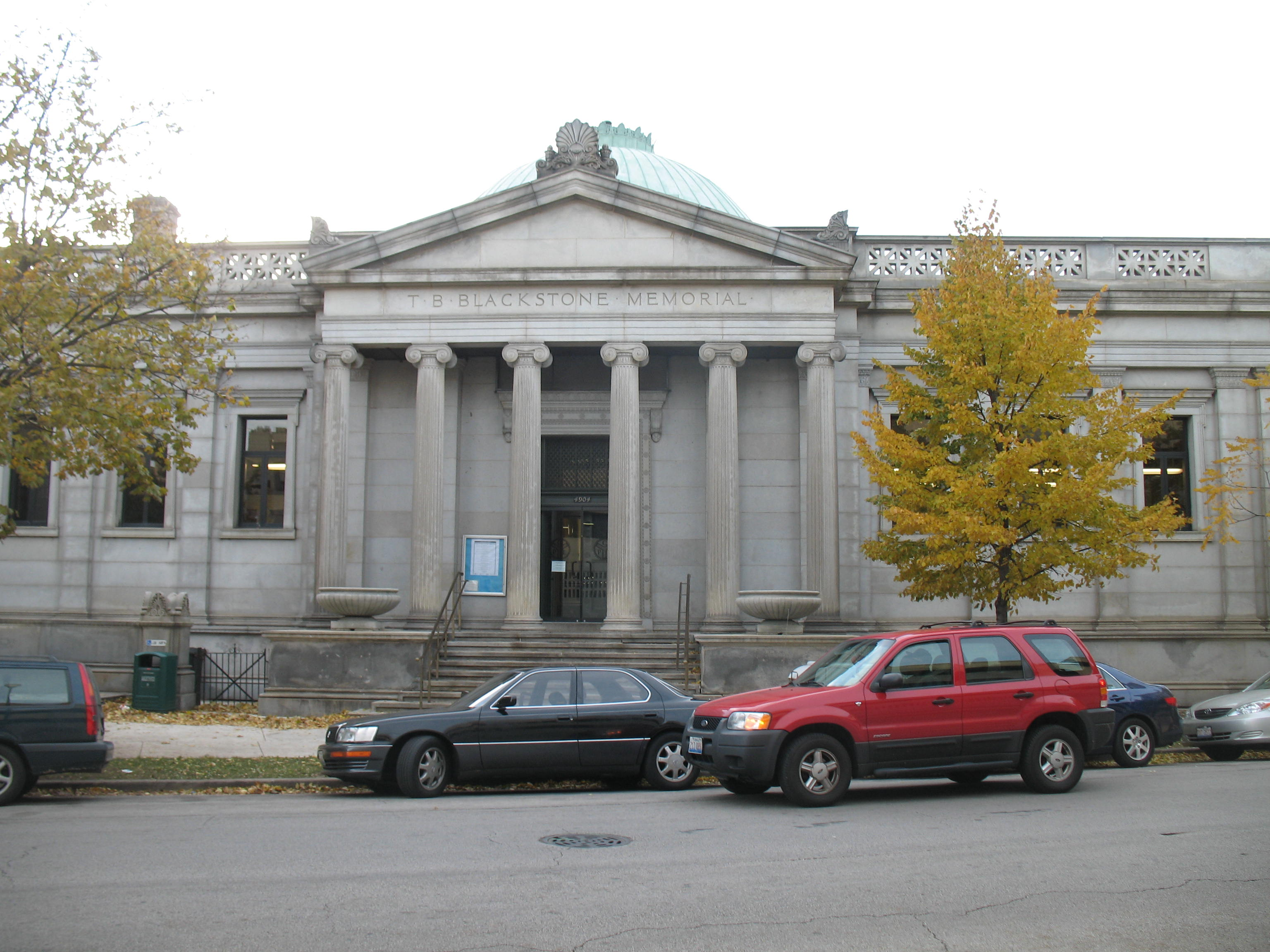
Blackstone Library

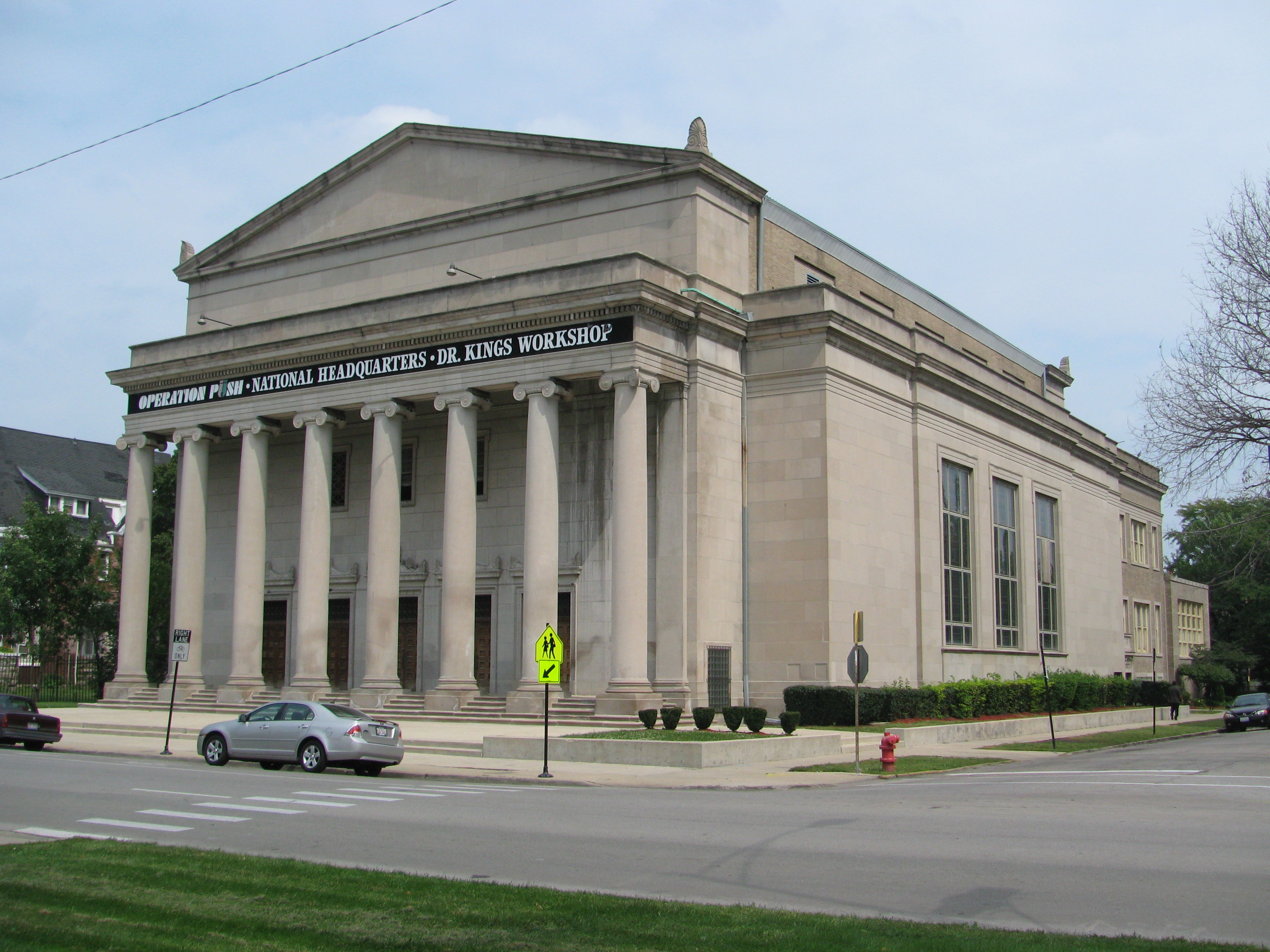
The headquarters of Jesse Jackson's Rainbow/PUSH

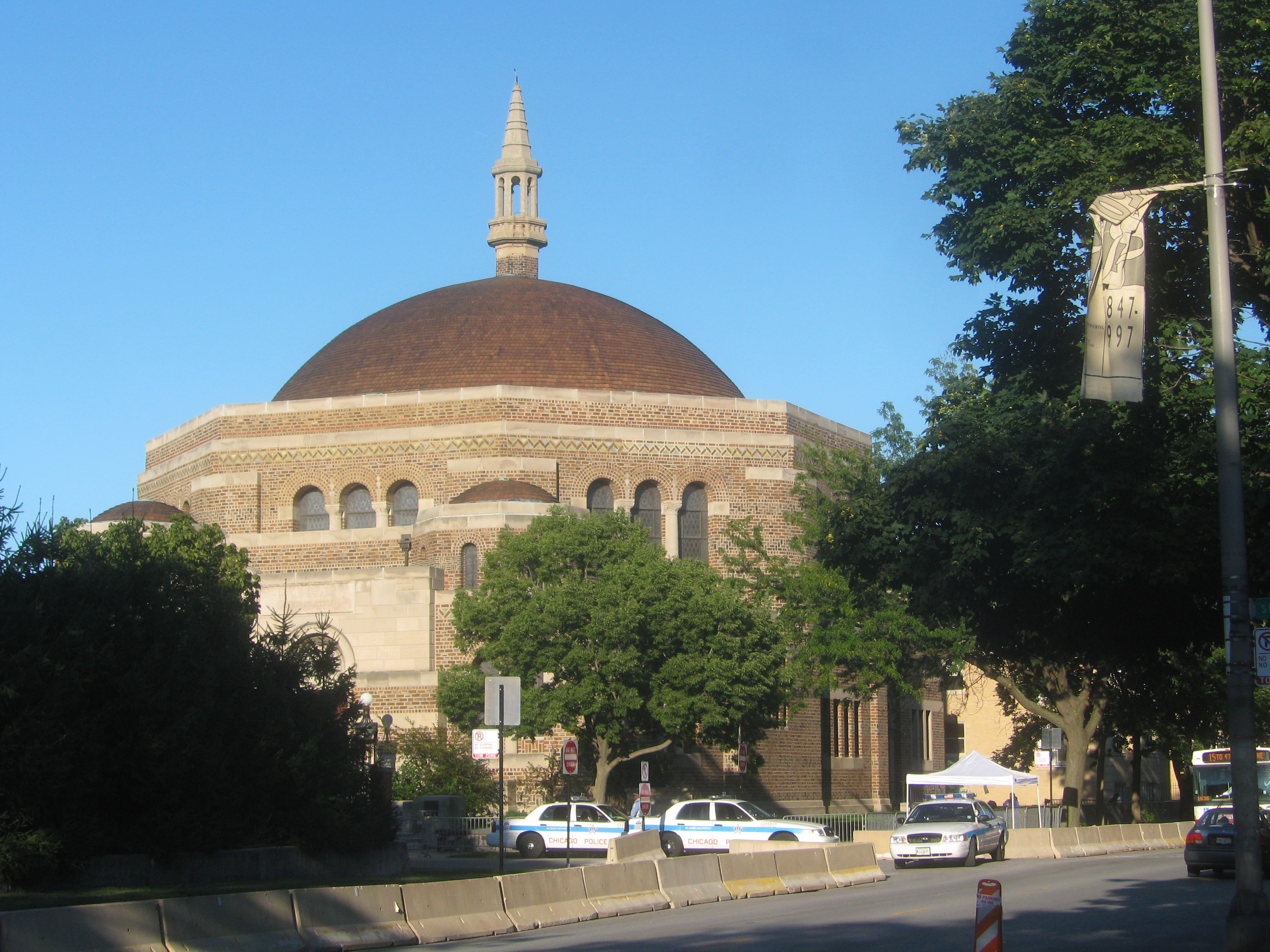
The KAM Isaiah Israel synagogue

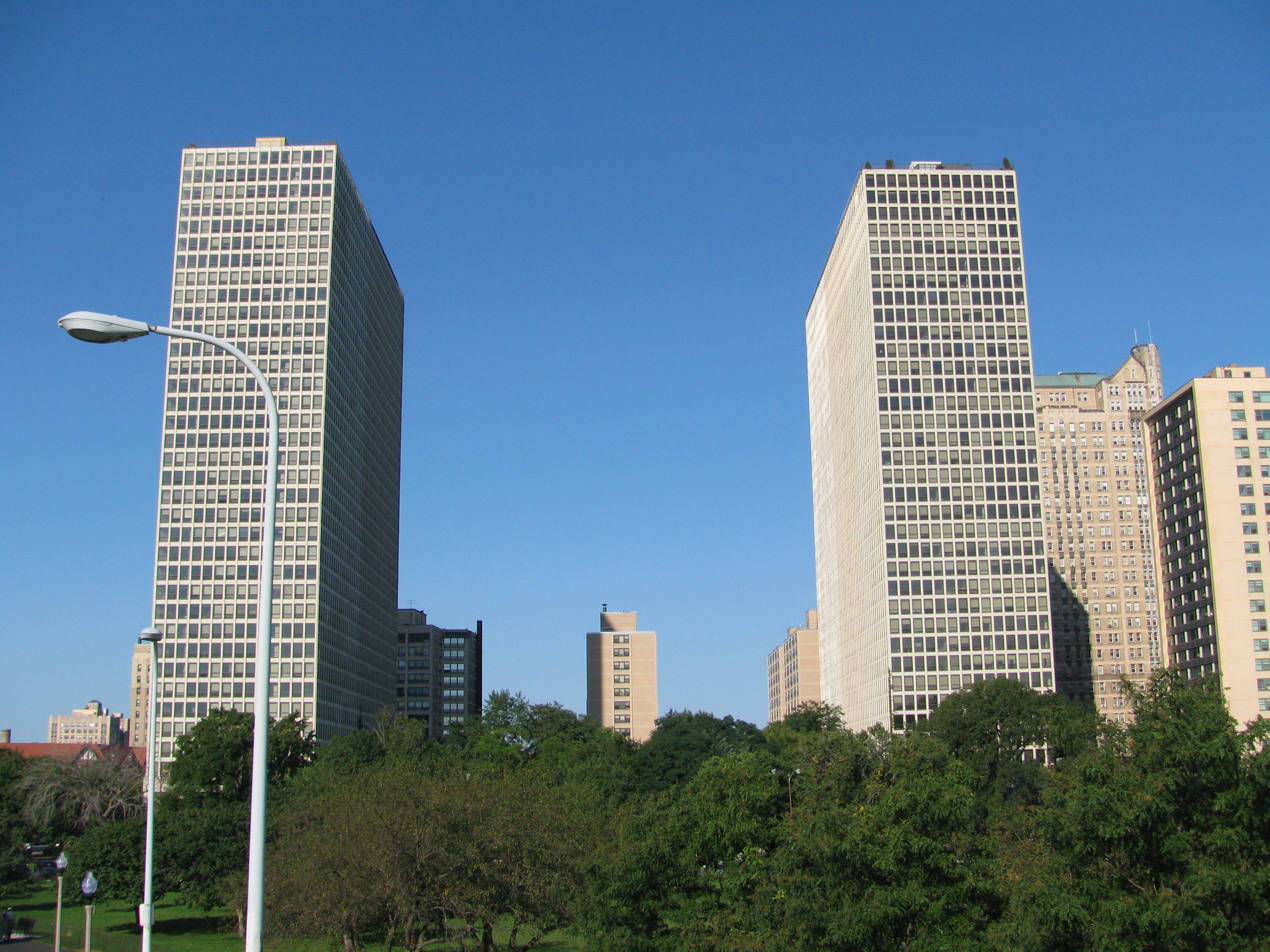
The Regents Park apartment complex
