= Burnham Park (Chicago) =

Urban park

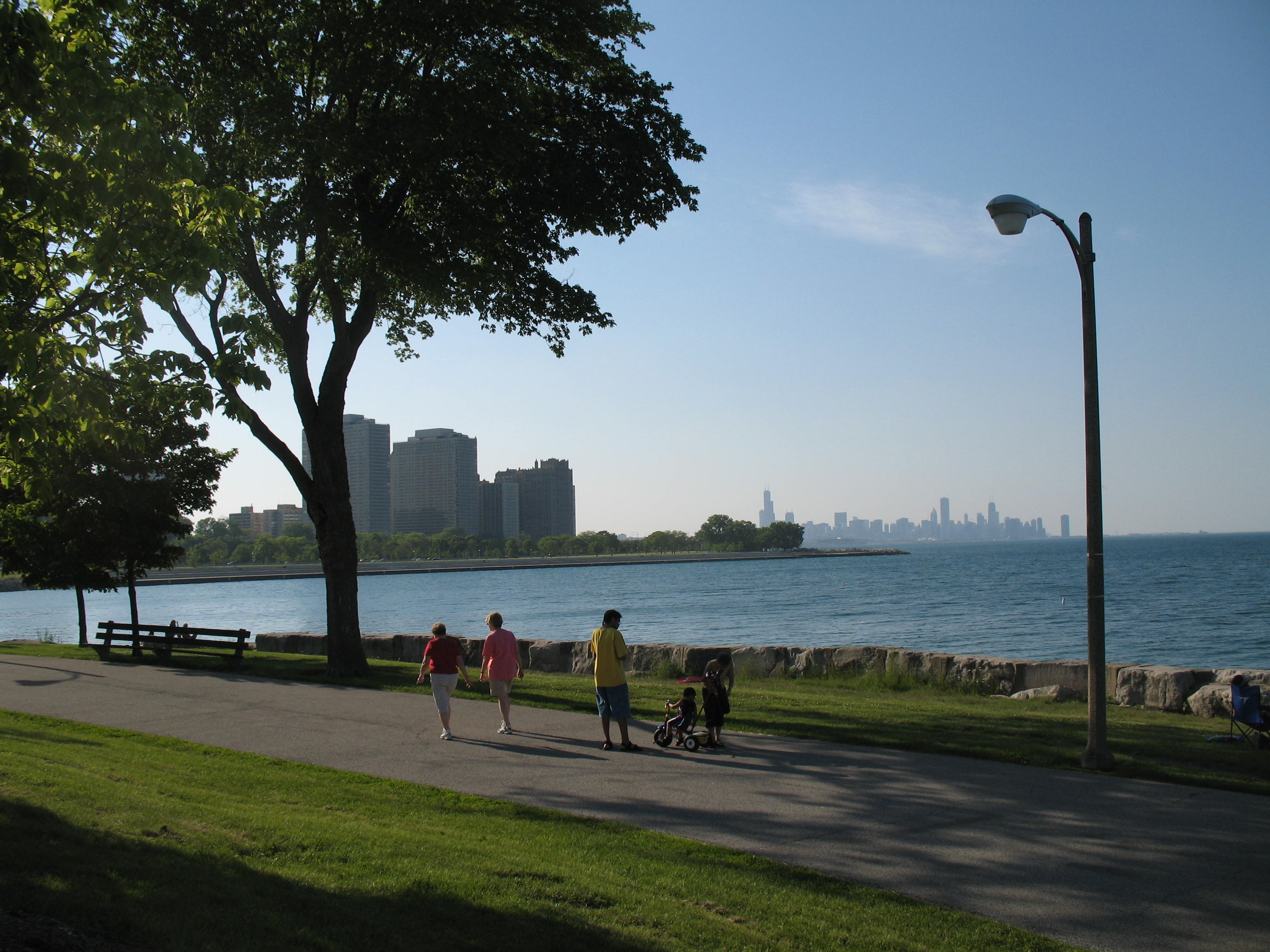
- Northerly view of Burnham Park from Promontory Point (05/28/06)
- Interactive map of Burnham Park
- Type: Urban
- Location: Chicago, Cook County, Illinois
- Coordinates: 41°50′7″N 87°36′26″W
- Area: 598 acres (242 ha)
- Created: 1920
- Operator: Chicago Park District
- Open: All year
- Website: www.chicagoparkdistrict.com/parks/Burnham-Park/

Burnham Park is a public park located in Chicago, Illinois. Situated along 6 miles (9.7 km) of Lake Michigan shoreline, the park connects Grant Park at 14th Street to Jackson Park at 56th Street. The 598 acres (242 ha) of parkland is owned and managed by the Chicago Park District. It was named for urban planner and architect Daniel Burnham in 1927. Burnham was one of the designers of the 1893 World's Columbian Exposition.

The park is an outgrowth of the 1909 Plan for Chicago, often called simply "The Burnham Plan". Land for the park has been acquired by the city's park district by a variety of means such as bequest, land reclamation, and barter. The park hosts some of the city's most important municipal structures, such as Soldier Field and McCormick Place. In the north, the park is adjacent to the Museum Campus in Grant Park and to the south it is adjacent to the Museum of Science and Industry in Jackson Park. The park includes several beaches, and boat harbors, as well as hiking and biking trails and nature reserves. During the presidency of U.S. President Barack Obama, the park was the landing site for Marine One when visiting his Kenwood home on Chicago's South Side.

== Location ==
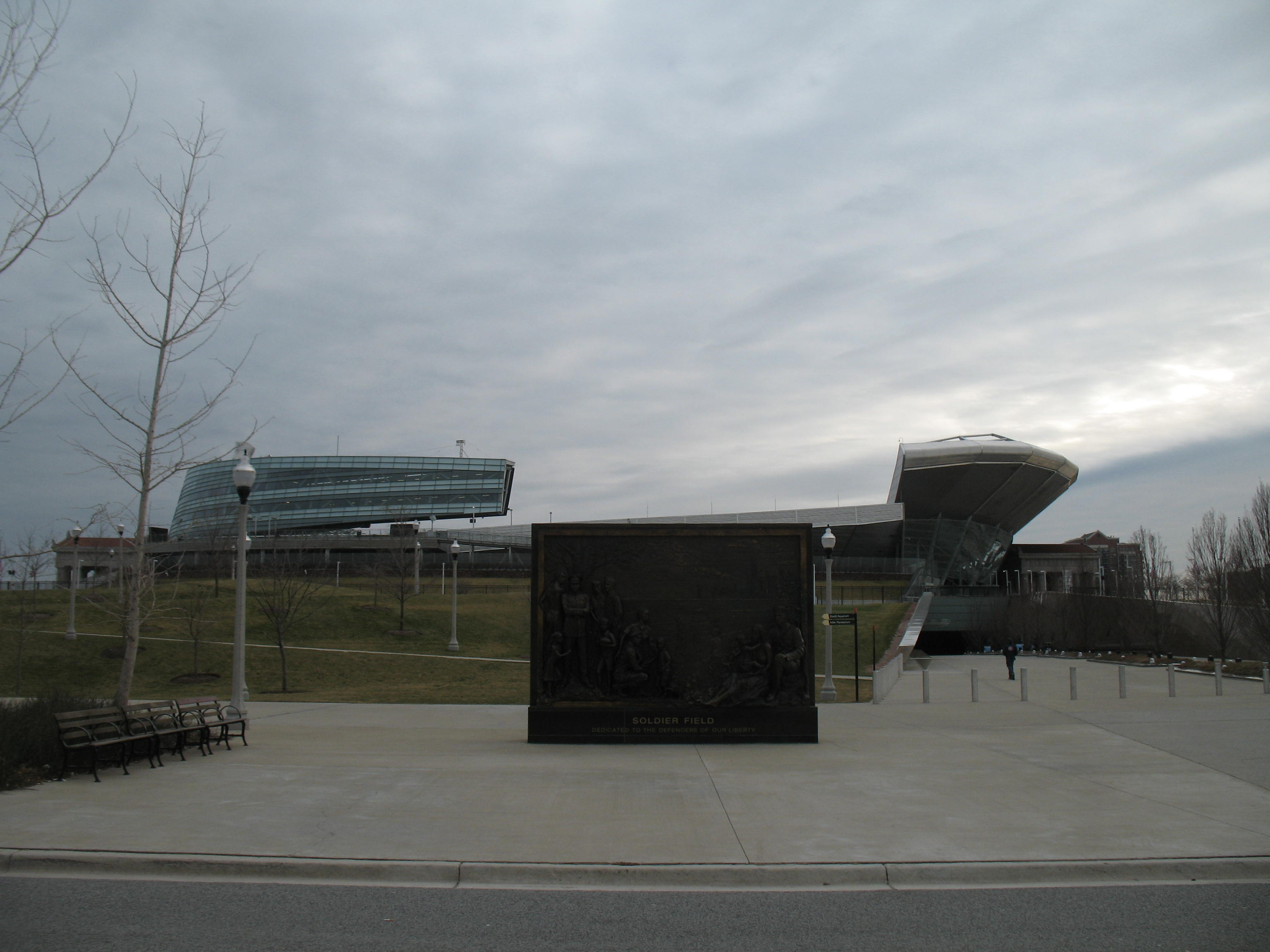
The Veteran's Memorial at Soldier Field

McFetridge Drive is the boundary between Grant Park and Burnham Park. Beginning with Northerly Island and the 14th Street Beach, and enclosing Burnham Harbor and its public marina, the park runs in a narrow strip past Soldier Field and McCormick Place, both of which disrupt Burnham's original plan, south to 56th street. From North to South, the park runs through the communities of Near South, Douglas, Oakland, Kenwood and Hyde Park.

The park lies mostly between Lake Shore Drive and Lake Michigan, but it crosses the drive and abuts the Illinois Central Railroad tracks in places. There is a beach at 31st Street, a skatepark at 34th Street, a stone beach at 49th Street, and a model boat pond at 51st Street in Hyde Park. The park ends with a flourish at Promontory Point at 55th Street. Footbridges and underpasses provide access to the park over the barriers of the train tracks and Lake Shore Drive. A 6-mile (9.7 km) section of the Chicago Lakefront Trail bicycle and jogging path runs the length of the park.

== History ==
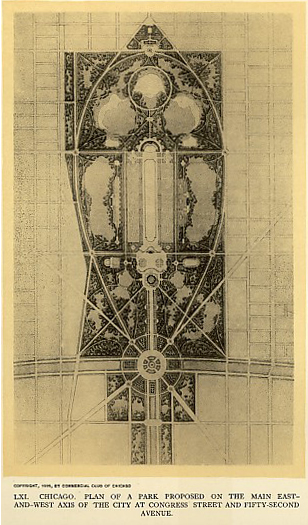
A copy of The Chicago Plan

Ward fought for the poor people's access to Chicago's lakefront. In 1906, he campaigned to preserve neighboring Grant Park as a public park. Grant Park has been protected since 1836 by "forever open, clear and free" legislation that has been affirmed by four previous Illinois Supreme Court rulings. In the mid-1890s, architect Daniel Burnham began planning a park and boulevard that would link Jackson Park with Grant Park and downtown. As Chief of Construction for the World's Columbian Exposition of 1893, Burnham was known for developing the White City. After the fair, Burnham began designing a more functional Chicago. Burnham's plan, including a lakefront park with a series of islands, boating harbor, beaches, and playfields was published in his 1909 Plan of Chicago. Burnham's famous 1909 plan eventually preserved Grant Park and the entire Chicago lakefront.

=== 1860-1890 ===
Paul Cornell, a lawyer and real estate developer, donated and built East End Park between 51st and 53rd Streets in 1856. After much of the land eroded, the property was incorporated into Burnham Park and was eventually renamed Harold Washington Park in 1992. In the years following his donation, expansions were built at the northeast corner of the future Jackson Park, located at the south end of Burnham. The most notable expansions included a seawall and granite paved strolling beach, constructed from 1884 to 1888, and a building used as the Iowa Pavilion during the Columbian Exposition.

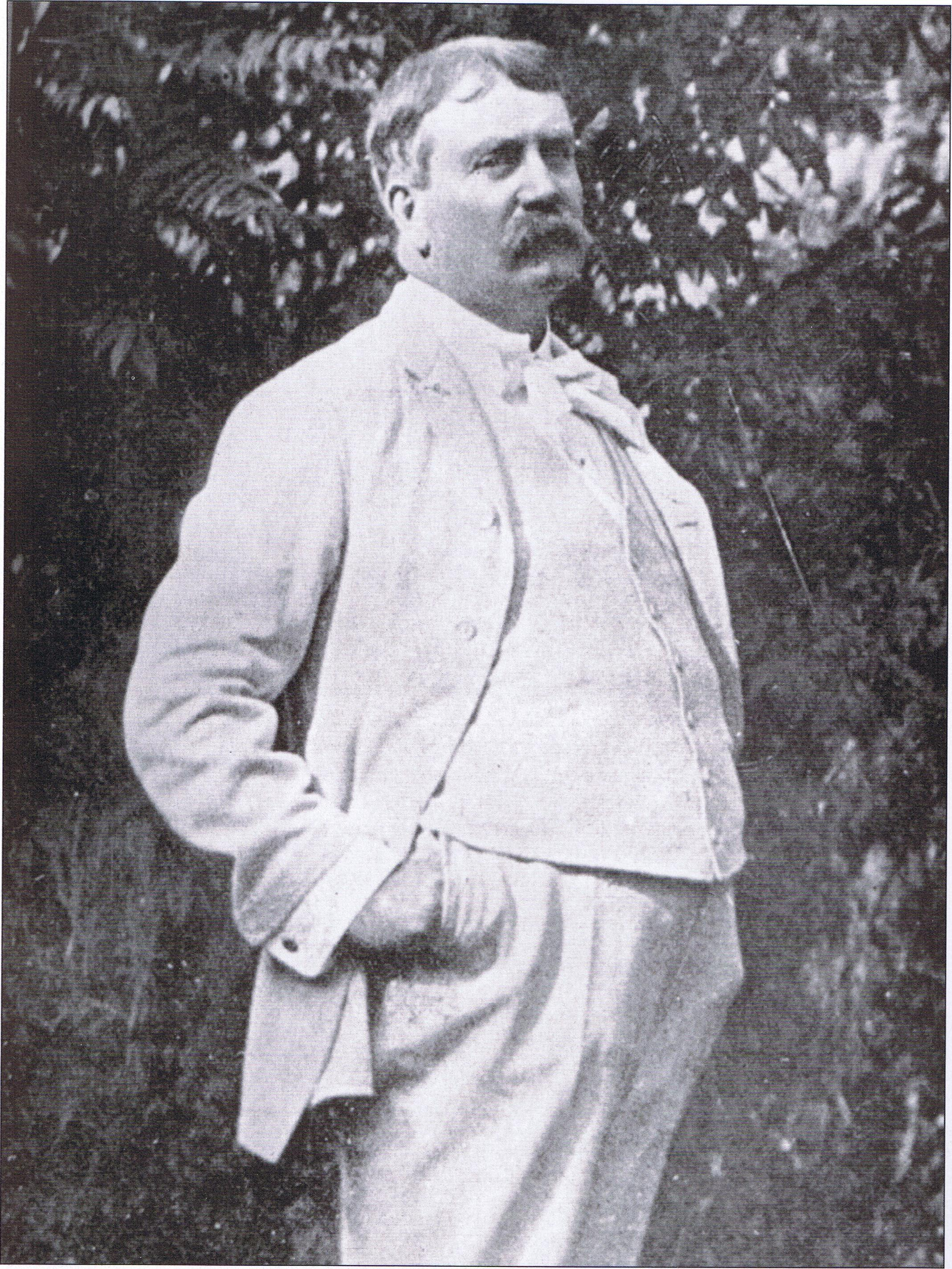
Daniel Burnham (1846–1912)

Cornell lobbied for the establishment of the South Parks and Boulevard System. The first bond vote was rejected in 1867, as just a method to provide remote driving grounds for rich citizens and to lure people to move away for the benefit of real estate speculators and developers. In 1869, the bills were passed by the legislature, and the South Park Commission was formed with support from Cornell. The future site was primarily under Lake Michigan or abutting the Illinois Central Railroad right of way. In 1892, the formerly trestled railroad was raised on an embankment, along the present west edge of the park. South Park (the present Jackson Park) was slowly developed, and along with the Midway Plaisance and Washington Park, the designs by Frederick Olmsted and Calvert Vaux were focused on lagoons and navigation from the Lake to South Park Way (now King Dr.) and 55th Street, in addition to the development of a country driving park, horse and buggy paths along the lake, and a water system running north to downtown. By the 1880s, the development included the Kenwood and Bowen communities, and by the 1890s, immigrant neighborhoods were developing. The city limits were expanded from 39th to 130th in 1889, absorbing virtually all of Hyde Park Township (35th to 138th).

=== 1890-1910 ===
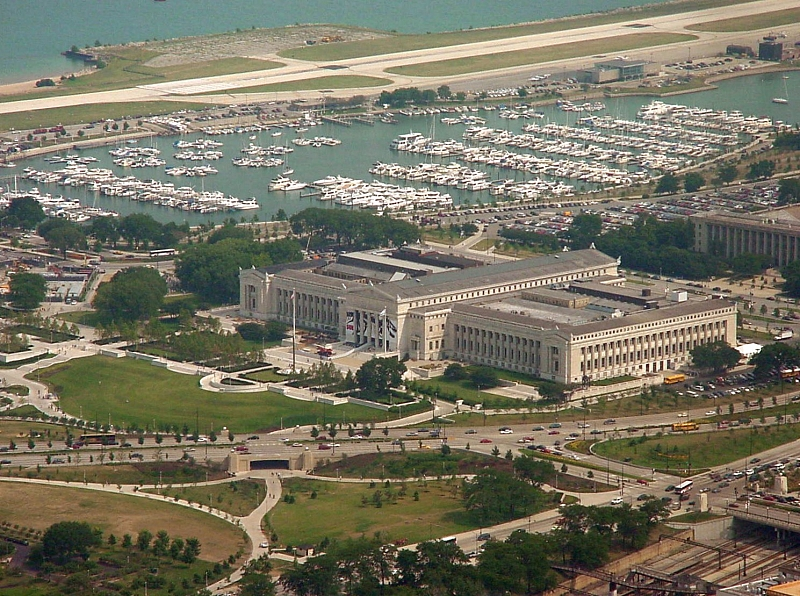
Burnham Harbor in Burnham Park with the Field Museum of Natural History in the foreground

The Columbian Exposition was held in Jackson Park, leaving housing in Hyde Park built for the Fair. The area around the new University of Chicago allowed real estate developers an opportunity to profit during the depression of the mid-1890s. As part of Jackson Park's transformation, South Park Commission President James E. Ellsworth asked Burnham to design a boulevard linking Jackson and Grant Parks. Ruling out residential expansion, Burnham developed plans for green areas, harbors and lagoons, water scenery, a canal to downtown, and a scenic drive. With a theme of a "playground for the people", the area was planned to include bridges, beaches with pavilions, and bathing houses. In 1896, Burnham began marketing the plan to Marshall Field, George Pullman, Philip Armour, and business organizations. In 1901, the Chicago Commercial Club began promoting the ideas and in 1909, published the Plan of Chicago by Burnham and Edward H. Bennett and illustrated by Jules Guerin. From 1907 until 1920, legal battles to acquire parkland continued despite the 1907 Legislature passing a bill with language favoring railroads until courts rejected the legislation.

=== 1910-1920 ===
The South Park Commission received rights to the future site of the Field Museum in exchange for 160 acres (65 ha) transferred to the Illinois Central Railroad. Government agencies had to agree to plans, including the Cook County Circuit Court, General Assembly, Chicago Plan Commission, and U.S. Secretary of War. In 1912, Burnham died and a new Chicago Plan Commission was created. In 1919, landfill efforts began at the north end of the park. In February 1920, voters approved a $20 million bond issue as part of the Burnham Plan initiative for new lands to complete Grant Park, so as to create the South Shore Development. In 1920, the Field Museum was opened, with the exhibits moved from Jackson Park into the basement. By 1925, new landforms, including Northerly Island, the only offshore landform in the Burnham Plan actually built, were completed to 23rd Street.

=== 1920-1930 ===
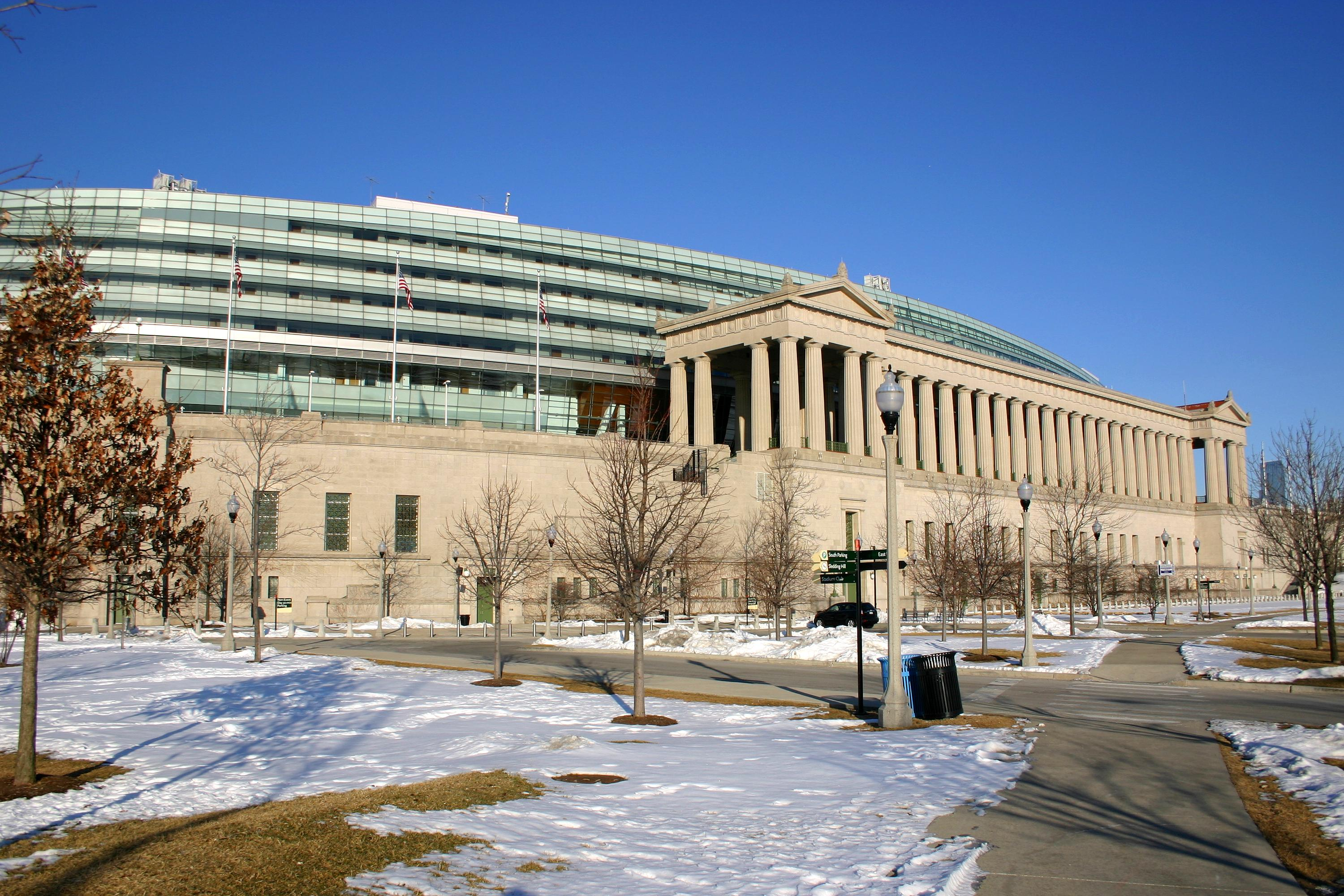
Soldier Field

A $2.5 million bond issue passed in 1922 for a stadium conceived by Burnham. Designed by architects Holabird & Roche and named Soldier Field for the veterans of World War I, cost overruns required another bond issue in 1926. By 1924, the breakwater wall stretched from 14th to 55th Streets. In 1926, Soldier Field and a portion of Lake Shore Drive were opened. Landfilling extended from 23rd Street to 56th Street; however, Promontory Point was not complete, prompting complaints regarding garbage, blowing sand and odors. Throughout the 1920s and 1930s, landfill efforts continued to fill in Burnham Park and the adjacent Northerly Island. The South Development was named for Daniel Burnham on January 14, 1927, and support increased for a world's fair in the park. Construction was completed on Lake Shore Drive, with northbound lanes named for Leif Erikson, and southbound lanes for Christopher Columbus. In 1929, construction of the park at Promontory Point began. The Great Depression delayed work and prevented construction of nearshore islands. Burnham Park was chosen for the site of the Century of Progress world's fair and a yacht basin was built south of 51st Street.

=== 1930s-1940s ===
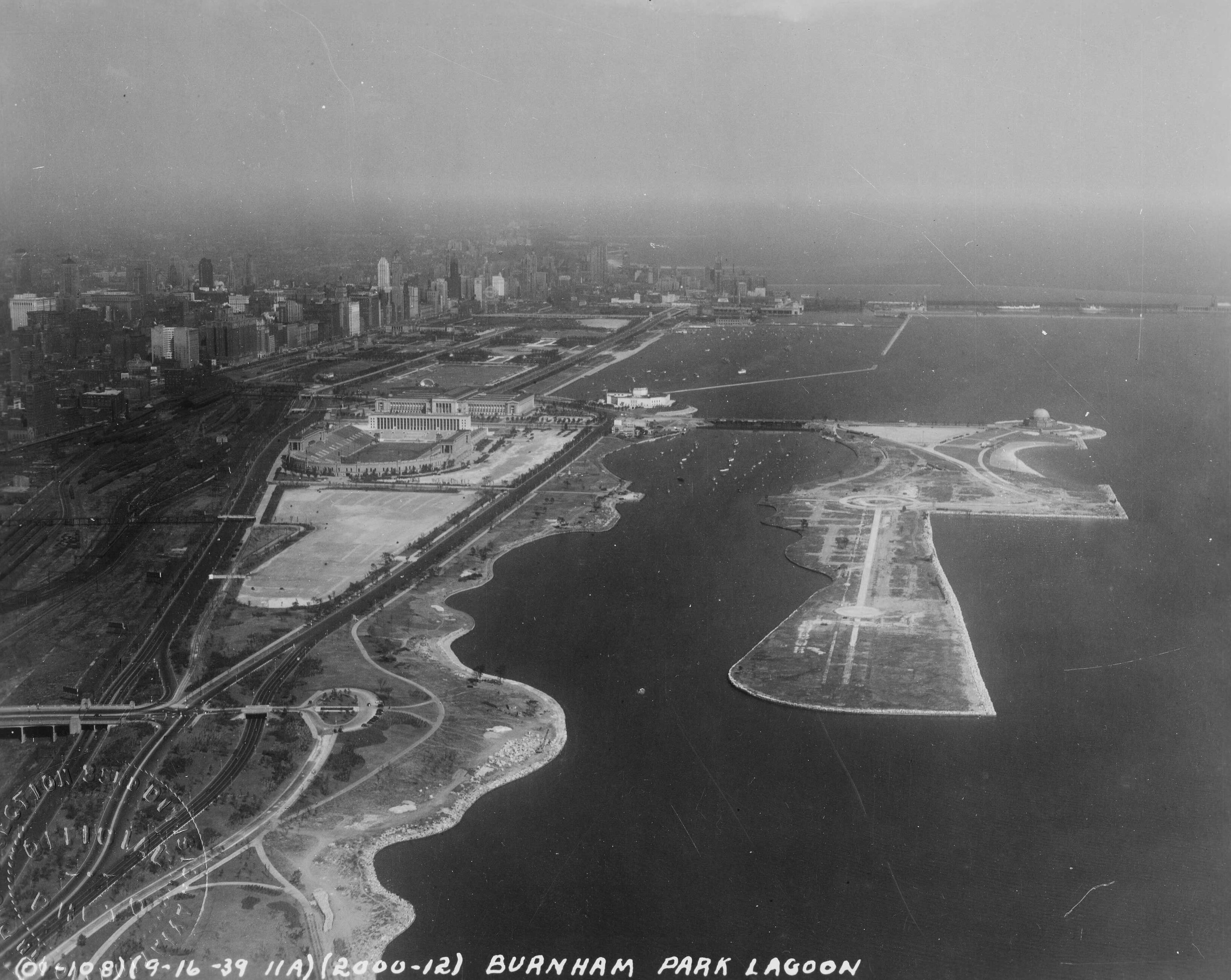
Aerial view of Burnham Park, 1939

In 1933 and 1934, the Century of Progress International Exposition was held in Burnham Park. In the mid-1930s, the Chicago Park District used funds from the federal Works Progress Administration to complete landfill operations and install landscaping at Promontory Point by designer Alfred Caldwell, a professor at the Illinois Institute of Technology. In 1935, Mayor Edward Joseph Kelly explored the idea of a permanent fair in the park. The state passed a bill creating the Metropolitan Fair and Exposition Authority and allowed construction of Meigs Field, after Northerly Island lost out as the site for the United Nations. In 1948, Burnham Park hosted the Chicago Railroad Fair, proving the location's viability for conventions, which eventually led to the construction of the first McCormick Place in 1960.

==== Balbo Monument ====
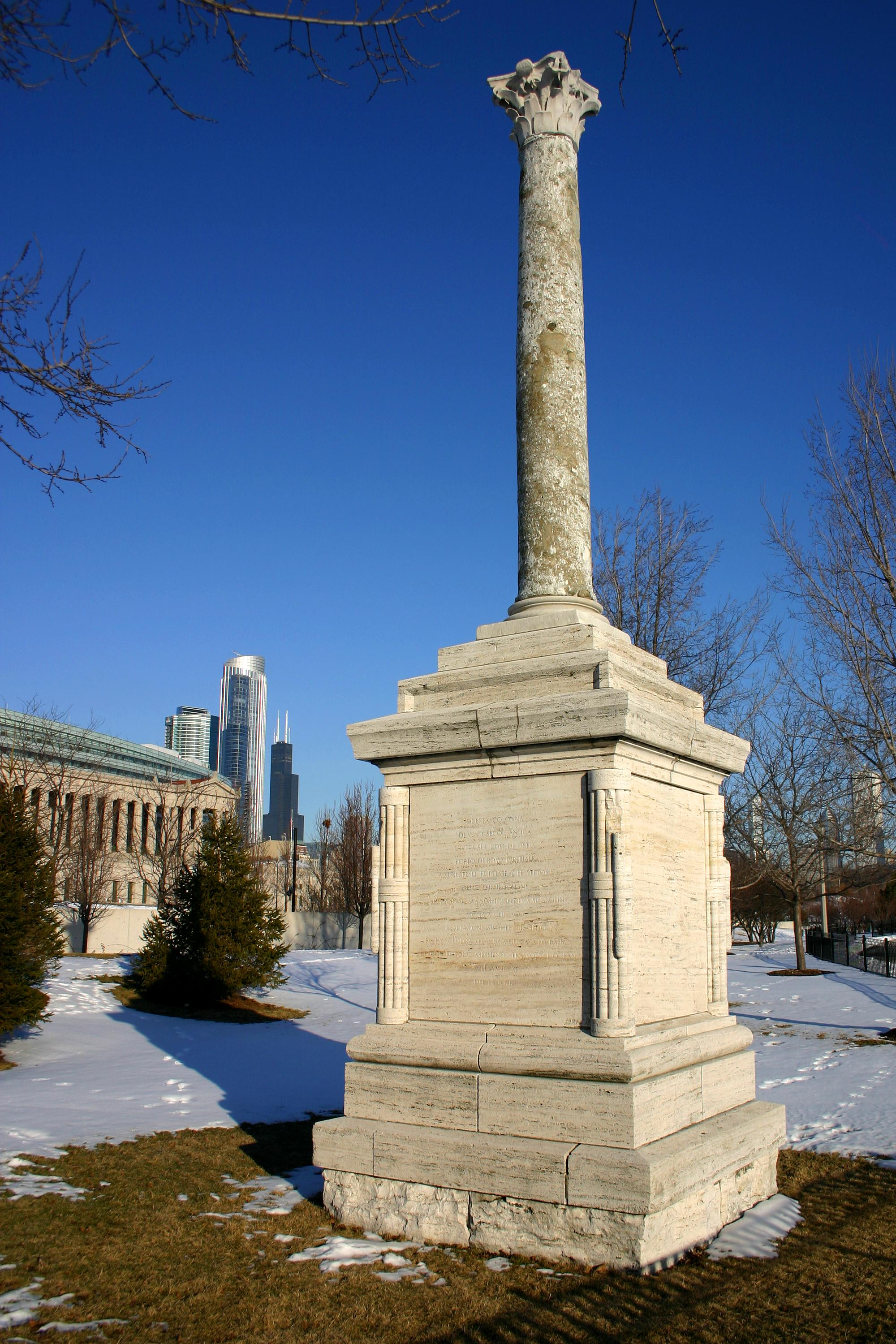
Balbo Monument

One highlight of the 1933 Century of Progress World's Fair was popular Italian aviator and prominent fascist Italo Balbo, leading 24 flying boats in landing on Lake Michigan after a transatlantic flight from Rome. Balbo's squadron left Italy on June 30, 1933, and arrived on July 15, after making several short stops. To honor his journey, 7th Street was renamed Balbo Drive. As a return gift, Benito Mussolini sent an ancient 2nd-century Roman column, which was erected in front of the Italian pavilion during the Century of Progress Exposition. Located near the lakefront bike trail east of Soldier Field, the Balbo Monument is one of the few relics remaining from the fair. The column is from a portico near the Porta Marina of Ostia Antica and stands on a marble base with inscriptions in both Italian and English reading:

"This column, twenty centuries old, was erected on the beach of Ostia, the port of Imperial Rome, to watch over the fortunes and victories of the Roman triremes. Fascist Italy, with the sponsorship of Benito Mussolini, presents to Chicago a symbol and memorial in honor of the Atlantic Squadron led by Balbo, which with Roman daring, flew across the ocean in the 11th year of the Fascist era."

=== 1950s-1970s ===
During the 1950s, the park was the host of a Project Nike air defense system missile site. The United States Department of Defense and the United States Army kept similar sites in 40 United States cities during the Cold War and dismantled them in 1971. The original McCormick Place burned down in 1967, and despite opposition, a new facility opened in Burnham Park in 1971.

== Burnham Park today ==
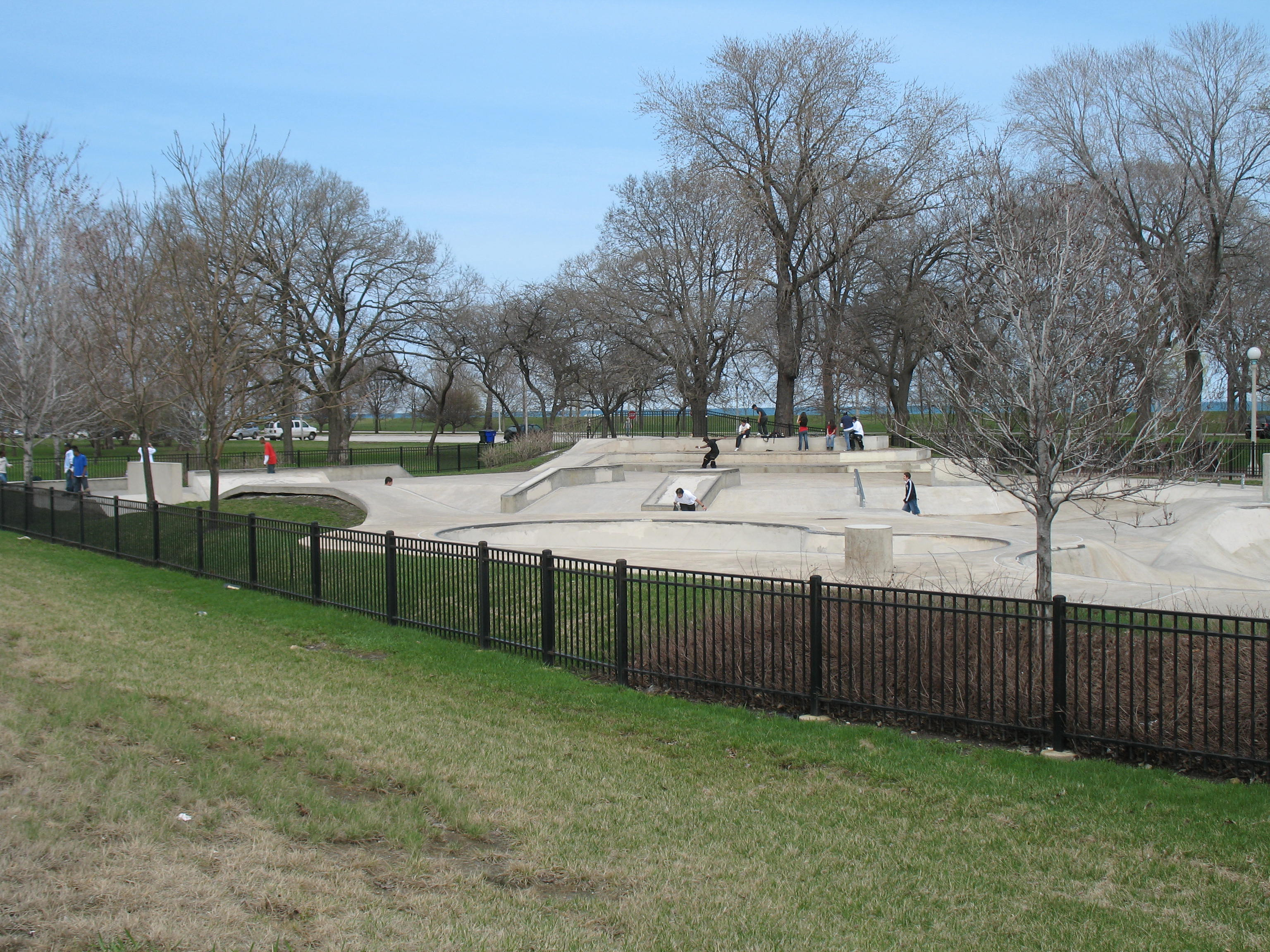
Burnham Park skatepark at 31st Street

=== Facilities ===
The Museum Campus, which includes the Adler Planetarium, Shedd Aquarium and Field Museum, was annexed to Grant Park from Burnham Park in the late 1990s. Burnham Park's 598 acres (242 ha) still contain Soldier Field and Chicago's premier convention center, McCormick Place-on-the-Lake, which hosts more than four million people per year. The Chicago Park District maintains several beaches and also operates a 20,000-square-foot (1,900 m^{2}) all-concrete skatepark, just south of the 31st Street Beachhouse. When U.S. President Barack Obama returned to visit his Chicago home in the Kenwood community area, he was transported by helicopter to a lawn landing in Burnham Park.

==== Harbors and marinas ====
The park includes two harbors for the docking of fishing and leisure craft. Located adjacent to the Museum Campus and Soldier Field, Burnham Harbor is created by Northerly Island. It contains 1120 docking facilities, a harbor store, a boat ramp, and the Burnham Park Yacht Club. The 31st Street Harbor, adjacent to the 31st Street Beach, opened in 2012. It contains 1000 floating slips, a harbor store, and a boat ramp. It also provides new park amenities.

=== Morgan Shoal ===
In 1999, the Park District initiated a long-range planning program for a number of lakefront and historic parks. On January 5, 2000, the Park District made its first move towards adding acreage to the park by adopting the Burnham Park Framework Plan. The project, which as of 2009 was still continuing, is a joint commission of the Park District, the U.S. Army Corps of Engineers, and the City of Chicago Department of Environment. The project has been delayed in part because the Corps of Engineers has been diverted to design projects for the Iraq War. In conjunction with Harza Engineering, BauerLatoza Studio designed a nature area within a portion of the park between 45th and 51st Streets, featuring the shallow bedrock in an area known as Morgan Shoal. The $42 million expansion will increase parkland by 30 acres (12 ha), filling Lake Michigan.

=== Chicago Lakefront Trail ===
The Chicago Lakefront Trail (LFT) is an 18-mile (29 km) multi-use path along Lake Michigan's shoreline. It is popular with cyclists and joggers. From north to south, it runs through Lincoln Park, Grant Park, Burnham Park, and Jackson Park.

== See also ==
- Parks in Chicago
- Powers of Ten, a 1977 short film by Charles and Ray Eames that illustrates the concept of orders of magnitude using a couple picnicking in Burnham Park.
