= Promontory Point (Chicago) =

Manmade peninsula in Chicago, Illinois

Coordinates: 41°47′45″N 87°34′37″W

Promontory Point

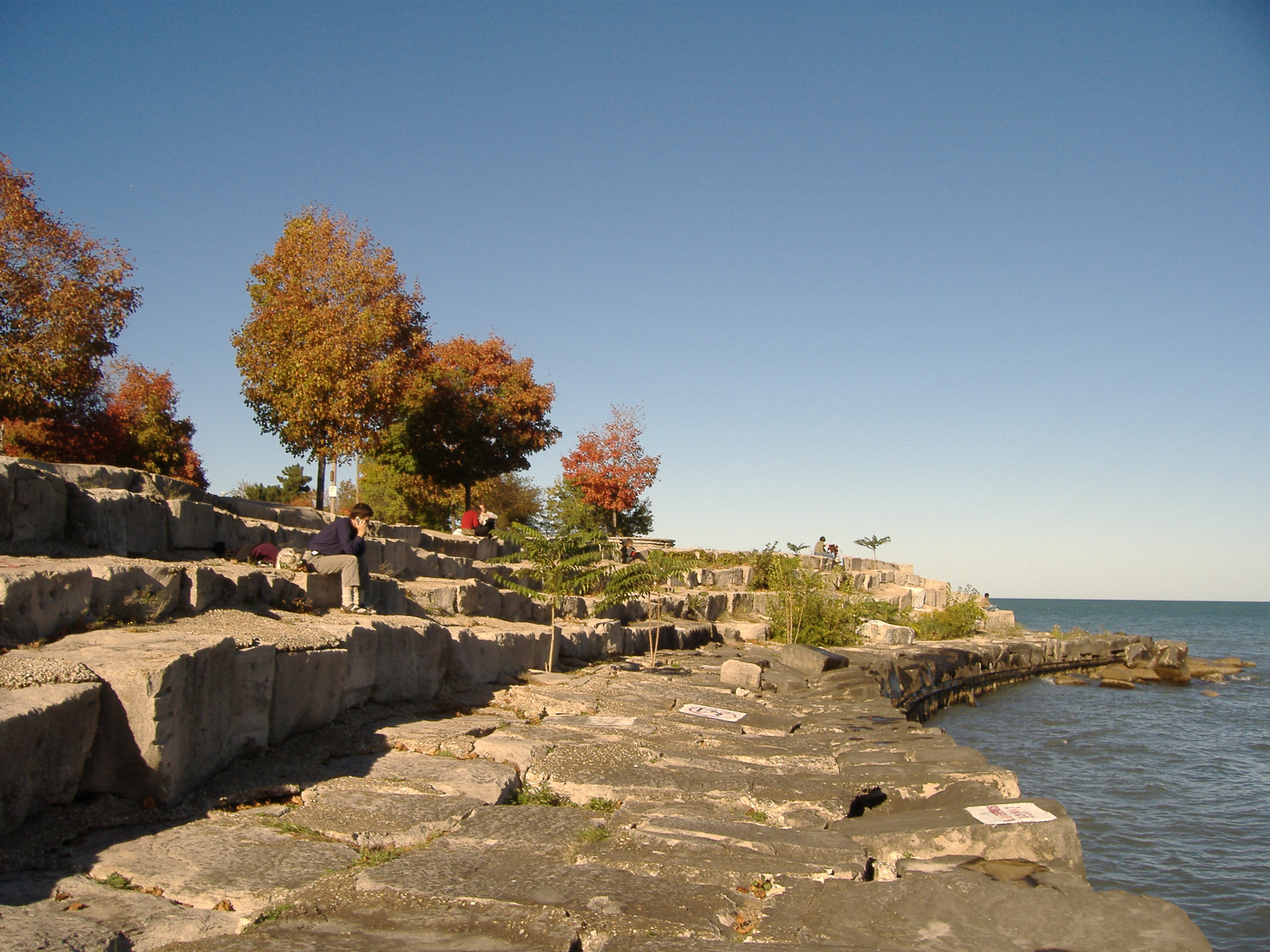
South side of Point, 2005

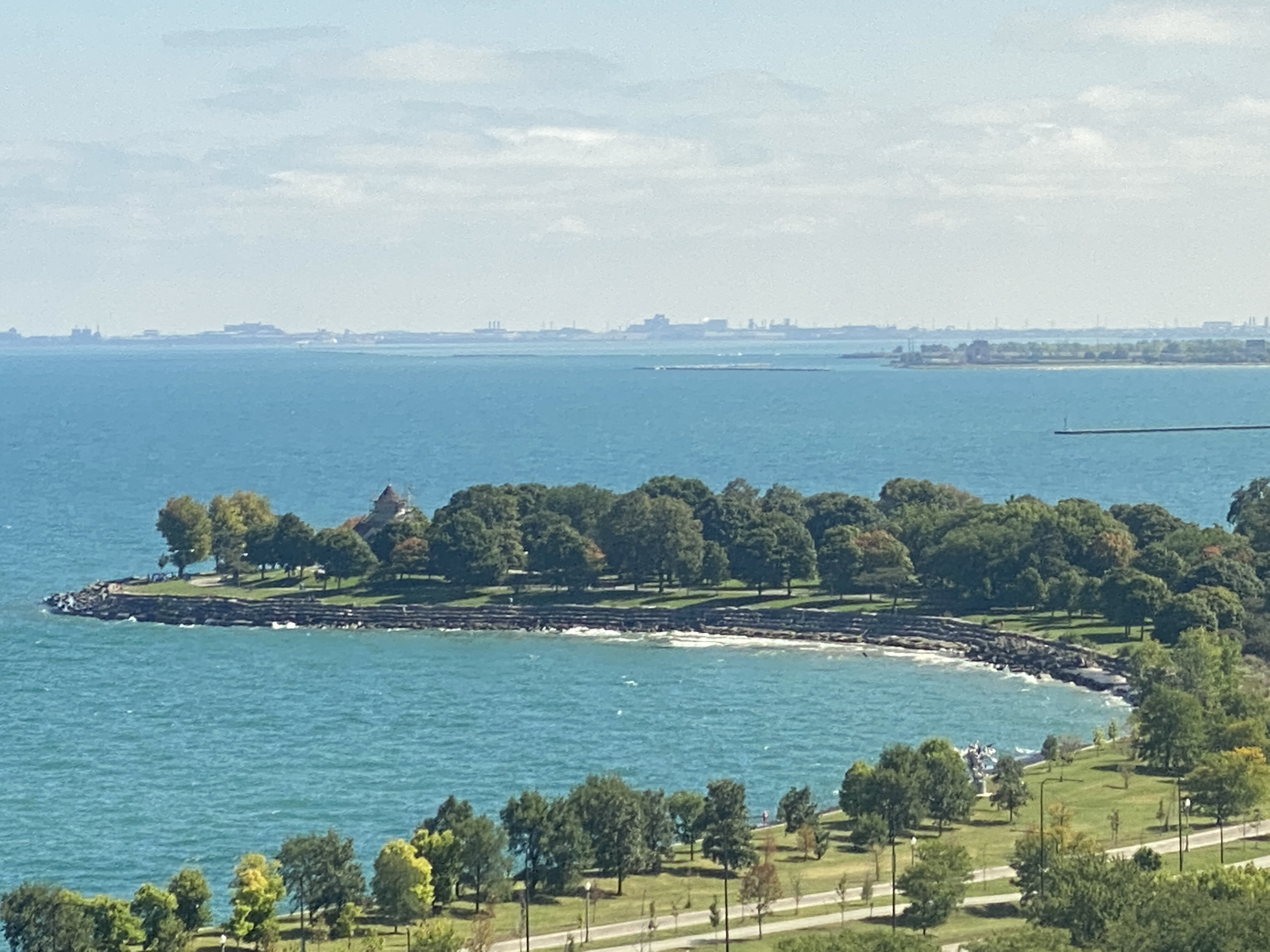
from Regents Park, 2022

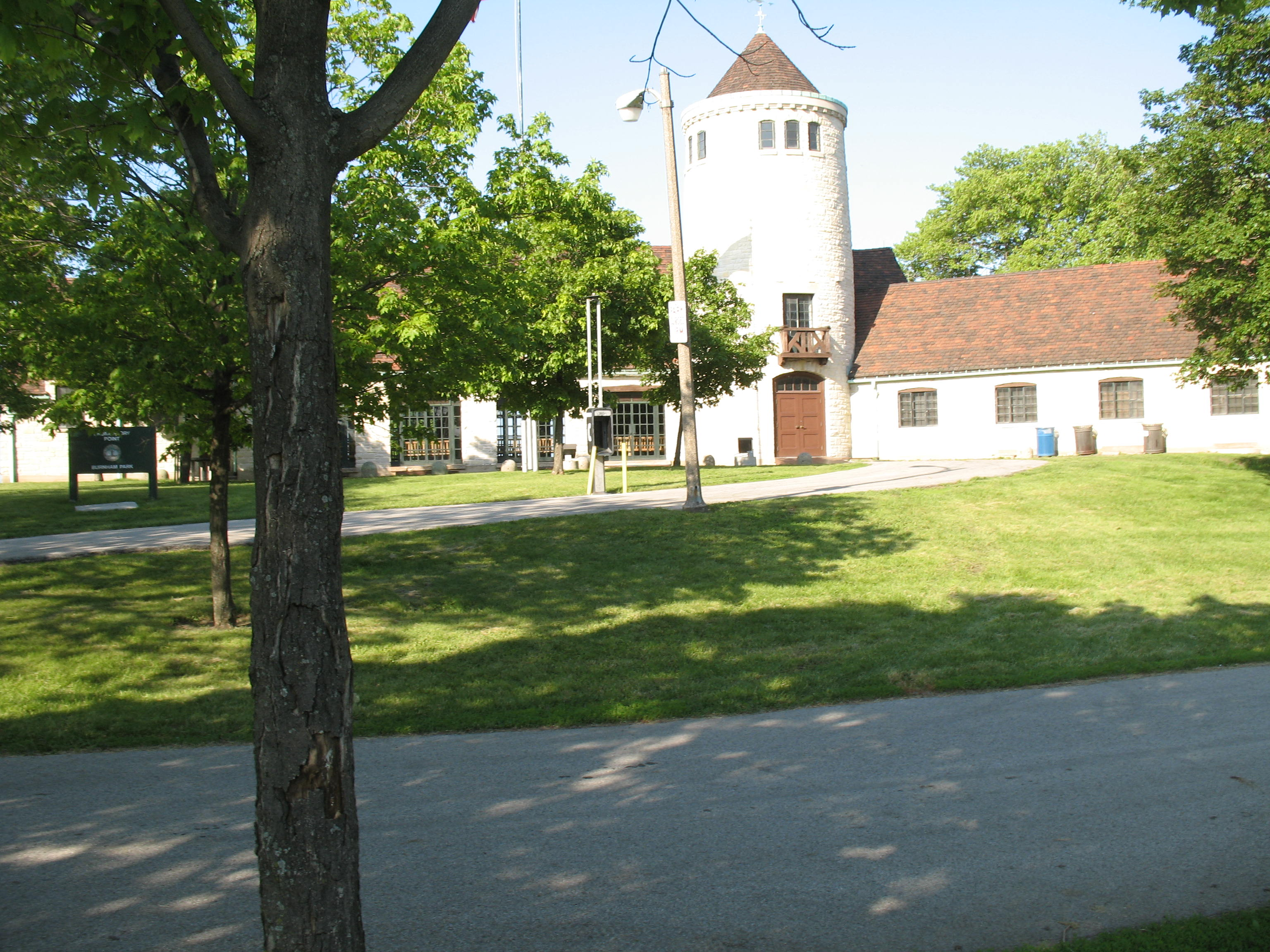
Promontory Point Field House, 2006

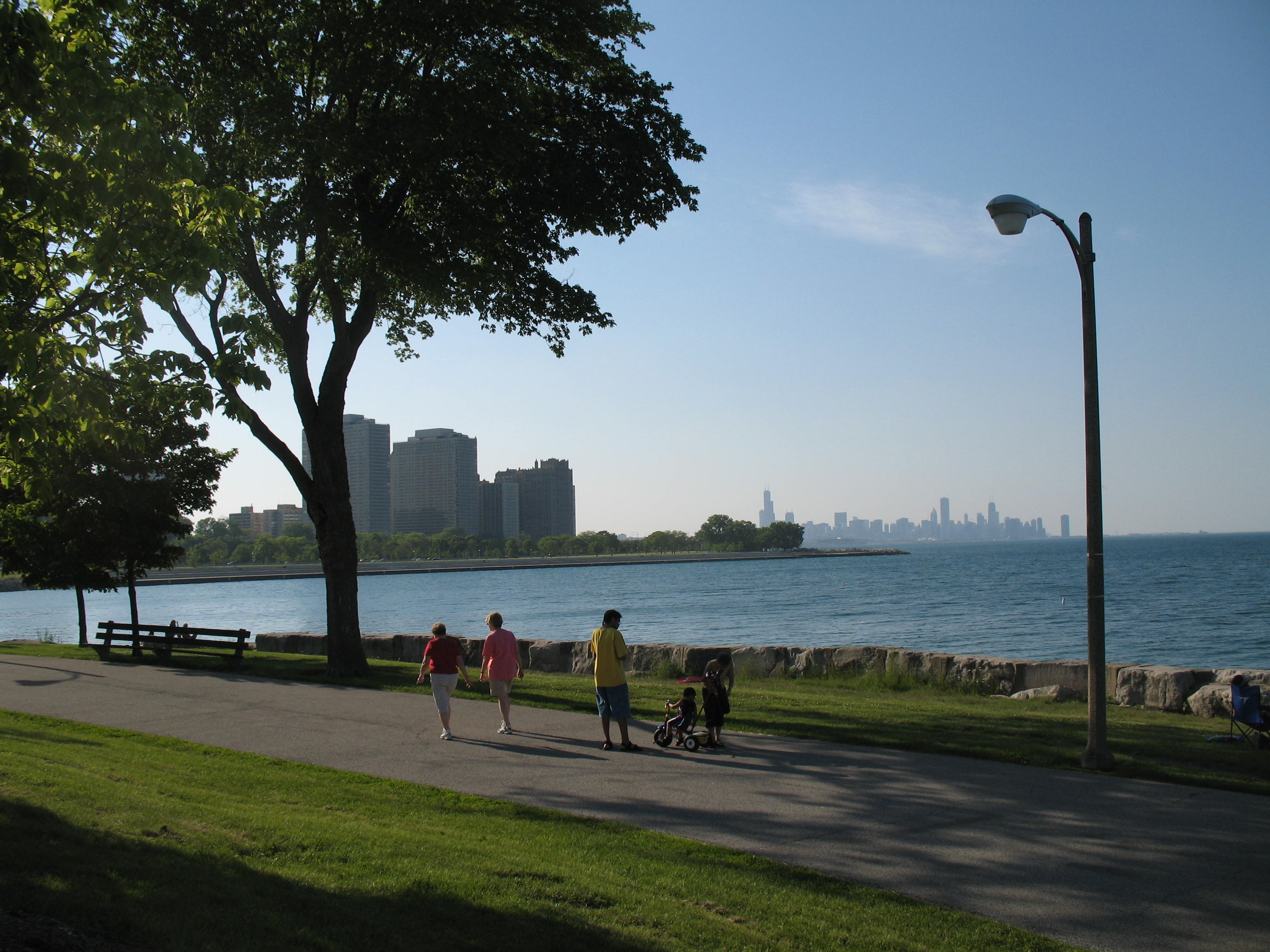
Northerly view, 2006

Promontory Point (known locally as the Point) is a manmade peninsula on Lake Michigan in Chicago's Burnham Park, located in the Hyde Park neighborhood on the city's South Side. Originally constructed from landfill, the Point was, by the late 1930s, protected by a limestone revetment designed and constructed by Chicago Park District engineers. The Point became a Chicago Landmark on April 19, 2023.

== Background ==
The Point was built on Chicago Park District land at the lakefront end of East 55th Street. It opened to the public in 1937. Alfred Caldwell, a student of Jens Jensen, designed the landscaping, following the Prairie School which uses native plants and stone. Caldwell's design featured a raised "meadow" section in the center of the 12-acre (49,000 m^{2}) peninsula and included hundreds of flowering trees and shrubs. In 1938, Caldwell created stone sitting rings - called "council rings" - around the lakefront edge, which today are used as fire pits. Few of Caldwell's original plantings remain today.

The park is accessed by the Lakefront Trail, and a tunnel which passes under Lake Shore Drive at the east end of 55th Street. At the head of the park, seen immediately upon emerging from the 55th Street tunnel, is the David Wallach Memorial Fountain. This fountain was designed in 1939 by Elizabeth and Frederick Hibbard in the shape of a fawn, with drinking areas at human and animal levels. During the Cold War the park also housed a 150-foot (46 m) radar tower for the Nike Hercules missile defense system; it was dismantled in 1971.

The park contains a field house, built in 1937, the exterior of which is made of Lannon stone from Wisconsin. Partly because of its view of the lake and cityscape, it is a popular wedding and corporate event location. It competes with the much larger Jackson Park 63rd Street Beach House and the even larger South Shore Cultural Center as south side beachfront special use facilities. The frequent summer fireworks displays at Navy Pier are often viewed from The Point, especially on Independence Day, when large numbers of Hyde Parkers and other south side residents gather there. It neighbors the Museum of Science and Industry and the 57th Street Beach.

Water access is an important aspect of the Point's history of use. Swimmers, sunbathers, kayakers, and windsurfers use the Point's revetment to access the waters of Lake Michigan. People have been swimming off of the limestone revetment at Promontory Point since it was built, in 1937. In the summer months, the North side of the Point functions as a "rock beach." The water is shallow and the lake bottom is sand, making the North side a family friendly swimming area. On both sides of the Point, open water swimmers enter the water off the rocks and swim across the bays. Both North and South side swimming areas are marked with "Swimming Area" buoys in the summer months. In the past, open water, or distance, swimming was a source of conflict with the Chicago Park District as the legality of swimming off the Point is ambiguous. From time to time, swimmers were ticketed. Recently, however, the Chicago Park District created an officially sanctioned open water swimming area off the South side of the Point. All motorized boat traffic is prohibited inside the buoyed areas.

== Events ==
Though open-water swimming continues year-round for the brave and hearty, there are spring and fall swimming events, held on weekends near the summer solstice and the autumnal equinox to celebrate the tradition and community of swimmers at the Point.

The Spring Swim Around the Rocks is held each year on the Sunday following the summer solstice. The Fall Swim Around the Rocks is held each year on the Sunday preceding the autumnal equinox. These events are open and no registration is required. Spectators watch from the shore while swimmers enter the water at the South side ladders and swim around to the north side shallows, completely circumnavigating the Point. The route then reverses back to the ladders (some swimmers complete a half-course).

== Revetment ==
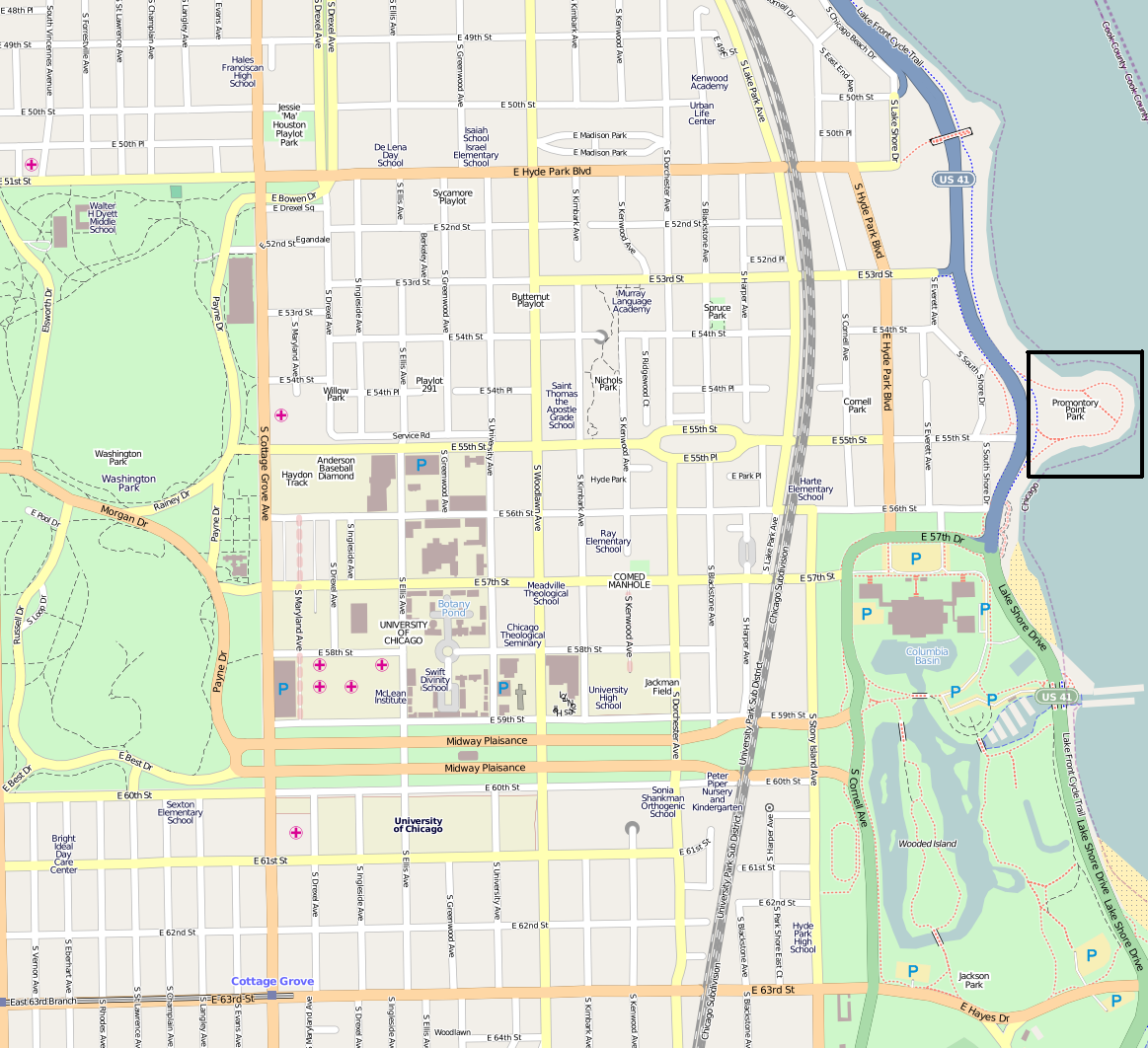
Location of Promontory Point within Chicago's Hyde Park neighborhood

Much of Chicago's lakefront was landfill. To protect this lakefront park land, a seawall or revetment was built by the Chicago Park District in the 1930s. This revetment consists of limestone blocks (with an average weight 2 to 4 tons) arranged in a series of “steps” leading down to the lake. These blocks are supported by a crib structure made from wooden timbers that encloses crushed rock. At the outer edge of the revetment, a series of wooden pilings, held together by a steel rail, keep the limestone blocks from tumbling into the lake.

At the Point, the revetment features four steps leading down to a 16-foot (4.9 m) wide promenade. The revetment at the Point is exposed to severe wave action and had partially failed by the early 1960s. A 1,000-foot (300 m) section of the revetment (out of approximately a 6,000-foot (1,800 m) total length) at the Northeast tip of the Point was repaired by removing the limestone blocks that form the promenade and pouring a pad of 3 feet (0.91 m) of concrete over the badly eroded crib structure. This repair stands today.

By the 1980s, the City and the CPD began a project to repair the revetment along almost all of the city's lakefront. Federal funds were sought from the U.S. Army Corps of Engineers, and a project study was begun. The conclusion of the study, published in the 1993, was that different areas of the revetment needed different treatments. At Promontory Point, a historic preservation treatment was agreed to and signed into public contract, and into law when the Congress approved the project, in a memorandum of agreement. This document states that “the Corps shall consult with the SHPO (state historic preservation officer), the City of Chicago and the Chicago Park District to ensure that the design and construction of the revetment will match the existing in accordance with the recommendations of the Secretary of the Interior's ‘Standards and Guidelines for Archeology and Historic Preservation’."

As the project moved forward and was finally funded, the ACOE, the City and the CPD changed the design at Promontory Point. The new plan called for the demolition of the historic revetment, and replacement by a monolithic concrete seawall.

In January 2001, the City and CPD held a community meeting to announce their plans for the Point revetment. This started a controversy that has not yet been resolved.

=== Controversy ===
The January 2001 meeting was attended by about 150 users of the Point and members of the Hyde Park community. Residents reacted very negatively to the City/CPD proposal to replace the revetment with a concrete and steel structure. Some felt that the revetment was not really in need of repair and should be left intact. Others felt that the City/CPD plan denied water access so vital to Point Users. Many felt that limestone was a more aesthetically pleasing material and should be used. The proposal clearly violated the Memorandum of Agreement signed by the City and the ACOE in 1983, which promised the preservation of the historic limestone revetment - a structure which the Chicago Park District itself nominated for listing on the National Register of Historic Places. At the end of this meeting, Alderman Leslie Hairston (5th) announced that she would form a working group of community members to meet with the City in an attempt to change the plan.

In the months that followed, this volunteer group, which Alderman Hairston called The Community Task Force for Promontory Point met and elected officers, called the executive committee. This Executive Committee met privately with the CPD, the city, and the ACOE. The result of these meetings was that the executive committee agreed to nine largely symbolic concessions that modified the CPD's new proposal. Included in these nine points were limited water access, limitations on the height and width of the concrete revetment, and a staged construction plan that would keep some part of the Point open for use during the two-year construction. The plan still mandated the destruction of the historic limestone revetment, to be replaced with a uniform concrete seawall. When the executive committee presented their agreement to the Community Task Force, it was rejected and the Task Force voted to not ratify the agreement. In protest against the executive committee operating without consultation with the Task Force members, the Task Force then immediately elected four new members of the executive committee. The original executive committee members then quit the group in protest. The nine-point agreement was rejected by the Task Force as without substantial compromise.

Following the departure of the four original Executive Committee members, the Task Force became more open and democratic, the membership grew, and the Task Force gained real leverage with the CPD.

Over the next several years, the Task Force worked with the city, the CPD, and the ACOE to preserve the limestone revetment, maintain access to the water, and perform restoration work, to include the thoughtful addition of access features (stairs and ramps). The effort was aided by Congressman Jesse Jackson Jr. and then-Senator Barack Obama. The current status of the effort is that all parties agreed to a new ACOE study on the preservation of the Point, to be performed under the direction of the Army Corps office of historic preservation.

The Task Force used activities to engage as much of the community of Promontory Point park users as possible. They promoted the effort with newsletters, letters in newspapers, meetings, presentations, T-shirts, and bumper stickers, to name a few. Bumper stickers can be seen on many vehicles (including automobiles, bikes and skateboards) in the city reading "Save the Point."

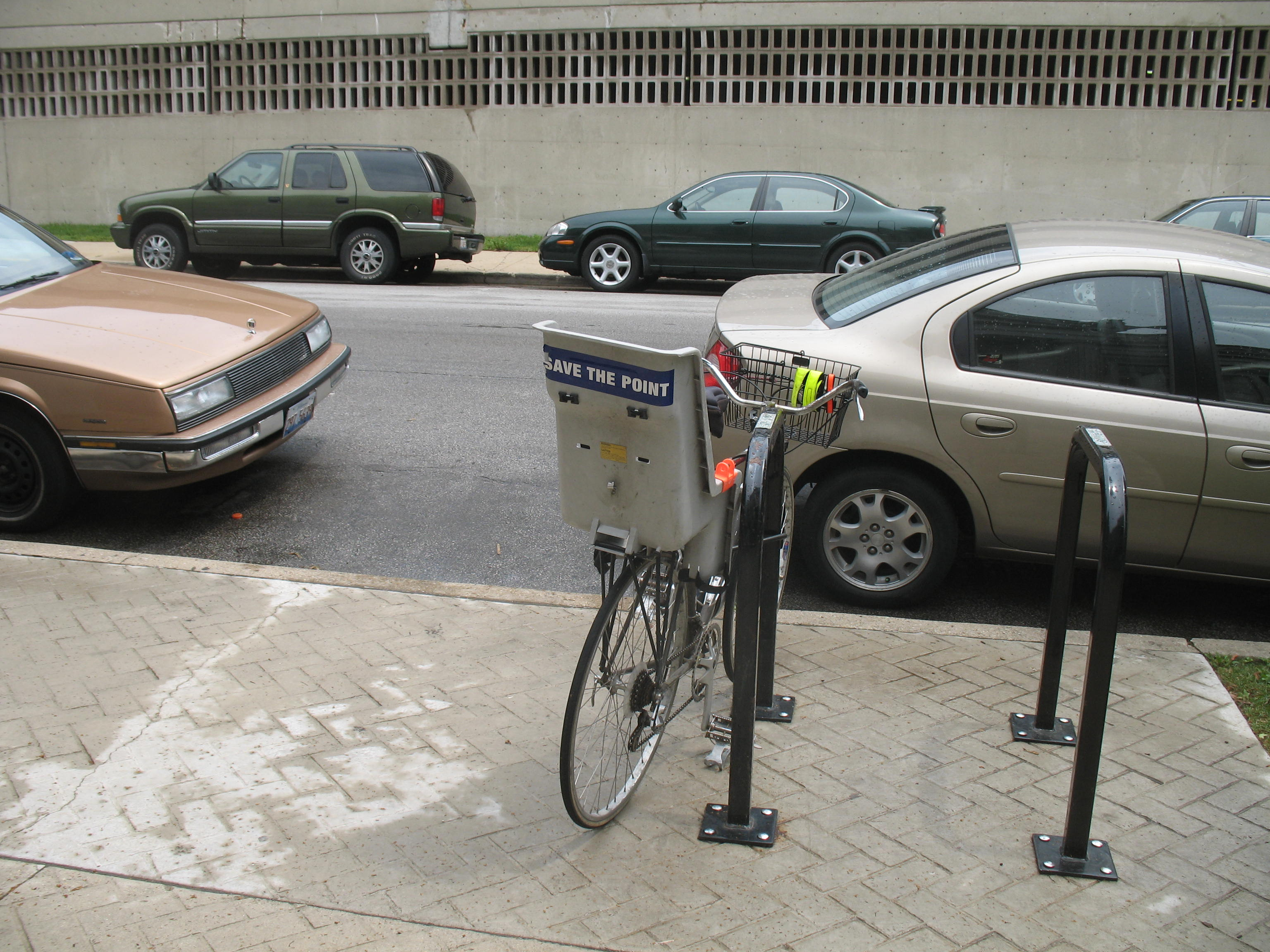
Save the point bumper sticker

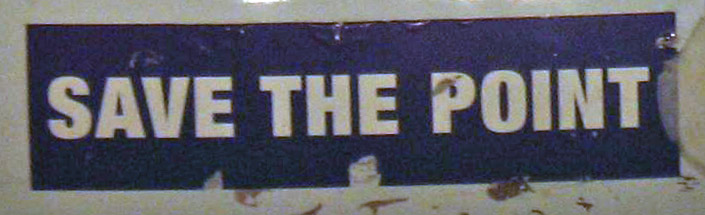
Another example of a save the point bumper sticker

According to an August 2006 statement by the U.S. Army Corps of Engineers, in response to issues raised most recently in a March 2006 meeting of the Corps, the City of Chicago, the Community Task Force, the National Trust for Historic Preservation, the Landmarks Preservation Council of Illinois, Preservation Chicago, the Hyde Park Historical Society, the Office of U. S. Congressman Jesse Jackson Jr. and the Office of U. S. Senator Barack Obama, preservation work will adhere to the following concerns of those in attendance and those of the Chicago Park District Lakefront Construction Director:

- Preservation enhancements that provide the level of shoreline protection storm damage reduction for a 50-year project life.
- Provide an appropriate level of accessibility to the water's edge for persons with disabilities in compliance with Department of Justice standards and approved by the Chicago Parks District.
- Represent reasonable costs to local agencies for construction and maintenance.
- Continue to meet with the approval of the U.S. Army Corps of Engineers in consultation with the Illinois State Historic Preservation Officer.

Promontory Point has been named by the Landmarks Preservation Council of Illinois to the 2004 List of 10 Most Endangered Historic Places In Illinois after being named to their 2002-3 Chicagoland Watch List. As of November 2006, they list it as still threatened. It was listed on the National Register of Historic Places in 2018.
