= Silver (Silver album) =

Studio album by Silver
- Released: May 7, 1976
- Studio: Indigo Ranch Way, Colorado; Sound Labs, Hollywood; Wally Heider, San Francisco
- Genre: Pop rock, soft rock
- Length: 37:07
- Label: Arista
- Producer: Silver; Tom Sellers

Singles from Silver
- 1. "Wham Bam” / “Right on Time" Released: August 13, 1976 (UK); 2. "Memory” / “So Much for the Past" Released: 1976; 3. "Musician (It's Not an Easy Life)” / “Right on Time" Released: 1977 (France)

Silver is the only studio album by American pop rock band Silver. It was released on May 7th, 1976 through Arista Records.

== Critical reception ==
Professional ratings
Review scores
Source	Rating
AllMusic	1.5/5 stars

Rob Caldwell of AllMusic wrote, "Wham Bam, a fairly weak slice of bubblegum pop, which was the hit from the album. Given to the band by Arista because the company didn't hear a single among the other tracks."

== Unused B-side ==
A Brent Mydland-penned track called "So Much for the Past" was recorded but was mysteriously left off of the final product, only appearing as a B-side to the "Memory" single. Since the band had already completed the album before their label gave them "Wham Bam", it's possible that the song was going to be included but was replaced by Rick Giles' track.

== Track listing ==
Credits adapted from the album's liner notes.

No.	Title	Writer(s)	Length
1.	"Musician (It's Not an Easy Life)"	Brent Mydland	4:48
2.	"All I Wanna Do"	Steve Ferguson	2:42
3.	"Memory"	George Thomas; Sandi Lifson	3:30
4.	"No Wonder"	Greg Collier	6:01
5.	"Trust in Somebody"	Collier	3:34
6.	"It's Gonna Be Alright"	John Batdorf	3:08
7.	"Climbing"	Mydland	3:21
8.	"Wham Bam Shang-a-Lang"	Rick Giles	3:32
9.	"Right on Time"	Collier	2:45
10.	"Goodbye, So Long"	Batdorf	3:46
Total length:			37:07

== Personnel ==
Silver

- Tom Leadon – vocals, bass
- Harry Stinson – vocals, drums
- Greg Collier – vocals, guitar
- Brent Mydland – vocals, keyboards
- John Batdorf – vocals, guitar

Production

- Tom Sellers – producer
- Clive Davis – producer
- Joe Sidore – engineer, producer
- John "Maverick" Simmons – co-producer

Design

- Guy Webster – photography
- Phil Hartman – sleeve design
