= Earl Scott =

Earl Scott may refer to:

- Earl Scott (coach)
- Earl Scott (singer)
