= Earl Scott (singer) =

American country music singer (born 1936)

- Born: September 9, 1936 (age 90); Youngstown, Ohio
- Origin: Nashville, Tennessee
- Genre: Country
- Occupation: Singer
- Instrument: Vocals
- Years active: 1962-1968
- Labels: Kapp, Decca, Mercury

Earl Scott (born September 9, 1936) is an American country music singer. He is the uncle of singer John Batdorf, who has recorded in both Batdorf & Rodney and Silver. Scott charted at No. 8 on Hot Country Songs in 1962 with "Then a Tear Fell", released via Kapp Records. He later recorded for Mercury Records and Decca Records.

== Discography ==
| Year | Single | Peak positions |
| Year | Single | US Country |
|---|---|---|
| 1962 | "Then a Tear Fell" | 8 |
| 1963 | "Loose Lips" | 23 |
| 1964 | "Restless River" | 30 |
| 1965 | "I'll Wander Back to You" | 30 |
| 1968 | "Too Rough on Me" | 71 |
