= Guardians of the Galaxy Vol. 2 (soundtrack) =

2017 film score by Tyler Bates

Guardians of the Galaxy Vol. 2: Awesome Mix Vol. 2 (Original Motion Picture Soundtrack) is the soundtrack album for the Marvel Studios film Guardians of the Galaxy Vol. 2. Featuring the songs present on Peter Quill's mixtape in the film, the album was released by Hollywood Records on April 21, 2017. A separate film score album, Guardians of the Galaxy Vol. 2 (Original Score), composed by Tyler Bates, was also released by Hollywood Records on the same date. Awesome Mix Vol. 2 was the United States' eighth best-selling album of 2017 with 600,000 copies.

== Background ==
Tyler Bates, composer of Guardians of the Galaxy (2014), announced that he would return to score the sequel film by August 2015. As with Guardians of the Galaxy, Bates wrote some of the score first so that writer–director James Gunn could film to the music, as opposed to Bates scoring to the film. Recording for the score began in January 2017 at Abbey Road Studios. By August 2014, Gunn had "some ideas listed, but nothing for sure" in terms of songs to include in Quill's Awesome Mix Vol. 2 mixtape. In April 2015, Gunn said he felt "a little pressure for the soundtrack because so many people loved the first film's soundtrack and we went platinum and all that other stuff. But I feel like the soundtrack in the second one is better." In June 2015, Gunn stated that all of the songs for Awesome Mix Vol. 2 had been chosen and built into the script. One of the most exciting things for Gunn in selecting the songs for the album "was knowing I would be making bands that may have been forgotten suddenly be a topic of conversation." Gunn had hoped to include "She's Gone" by Hall & Oates in the film, calling it "one of the greatest pop songs ever written", but could not find a place for it, as with "Teenage Lament '74" by Alice Cooper In January 2016, Gunn stated that he had chosen an additional David Bowie song to appear in the film (after "Moonage Daydream" was featured in the first film) but had cut the original scene it was featured in. The inclusion would have made Bowie the only artist to be featured on both mixtapes. With Bowie's death, however, Gunn hoped to find a way to include the chosen song somewhere else in the film as a "fair and appropriate" way to honor him, as Bowie was one of Gunn's idols. "For Once in My Life" by Stevie Wonder was also considered for a scene. Gunn called the Awesome Mix Vol. 2 "more diverse" than the first one, with "some really incredibly famous songs and then some songs that people have never heard."

On August 6, 2017, Marvel released the music video of an original song, "Guardians Inferno", performed by The Sneepers featuring David Hasselhoff. This was to promote the home media release of the film. The 1970s-style video was directed by David Yarovesky, and features Hasselhoff alongside James Gunn, Chris Pratt, Zoe Saldaña, Dave Bautista, Pom Klementieff, Karen Gillan, Michael Rooker and Sean Gunn. Stan Lee and Guillermo Rodriguez also make cameo appearances on the video.

== Guardians of the Galaxy Vol. 2: Awesome Mix Vol. 2 (Original Motion Picture Soundtrack) ==
Guardians of the Galaxy Vol. 2: Awesome Mix Vol. 2 (Original Motion Picture Soundtrack)

Soundtrack album by various artists
- Released: April 21, 2017
- Length: 51:59
- Labels: Hollywood; Marvel Music
- Producer: various

Singles from Guardians of the Galaxy Vol. 2: Awesome Mix Vol. 2 (Original Motion Picture Soundtrack)
- 1. "Guardians Inferno" Released: April 21, 2017

=== Track listing ===
No.	Title	Writer(s)	Artist(s)	Length
1.	"Mr. Blue Sky"	Jeff Lynne	ELO	5:03
2.	"Fox on the Run"	Brian Connolly; Steve Priest; Andy Scott; Mick Tucker	The Sweet	3:25
3.	"Lake Shore Drive"	Skip Haynes	Aliotta Haynes Jeremiah	3:49
4.	"The Chain"	Lindsey Buckingham; Mick Fleetwood; Christine McVie; John McVie; Stevie Nicks	Fleetwood Mac	4:27
5.	"Bring It On Home to Me"	Sam Cooke	Sam Cooke	2:43
6.	"Southern Nights"	Allen Toussaint	Glen Campbell	2:57
7.	"My Sweet Lord"	George Harrison	George Harrison	4:37
8.	"Brandy (You're a Fine Girl)"	Elliot Lurie	Looking Glass	3:03
9.	"Come a Little Bit Closer"	Tommy Boyce; Bobby Hart; Wes Farrell	Jay and the Americans	2:46
10.	"Wham Bam Shang-A-Lang"	Rick Giles	Silver	3:32
11.	"Surrender"	Rick Nielsen	Cheap Trick	4:14
12.	"Father and Son"	Cat Stevens	Cat Stevens	3:39
13.	"Flash Light"	George Clinton; Bootsy Collins; Bernie Worrell	Parliament	4:28
14.	"Guardians Inferno"	James Gunn; Tyler Bates	The Sneepers featuring David Hasselhoff	3:16
Total length:				51:59

All songs—with the exception of "Fox on the Run", which is played in the trailer—are featured in the film. Also featured in the film was the song "Un Deye Gon Hayd (The Unloved Song)" by Jimmy Urine. It was written for the film and appears during the scene on Contraxia.

=== Commercial performance ===
The album debuted at number eight on the Billboard 200 chart with 34,000 units in its first week, almost all of which came from traditional album sales. It later peaked at number four, reaching 87,000 units, again nearly all traditional album sales. Guardians of the Galaxy Vol. 2: Awesome Mix Vol. 2 finished 2017 as the country's eighth highest-selling album with 600,000 copies, and has been certified Gold by the Recording Industry Association of America (RIAA). It was also the best-selling album on cassette tape in the United States in 2017, selling 19,000 copies.

=== Charts ===
==== Weekly charts ====
Chart (2017)	Peak position
Australian Albums (ARIA)	2
Austrian Albums (Ö3 Austria)	3
Belgian Albums (Ultratop Flanders)	13
Belgian Albums (Ultratop Wallonia)	20
Canadian Albums (Billboard)	6
Dutch Albums (Album Top 100)	44
French Albums (SNEP)	24
German Albums (Offizielle Top 100)	6
Hungarian Albums (MAHASZ)	32
Italian Compilation Albums (FIMI)	3
Mexican Albums (AMPROFON)	8
New Zealand Albums (RMNZ)	4
Polish Albums (ZPAV)	17
Spanish Albums (PROMUSICAE)	7
Swiss Albums (Schweizer Hitparade)	9
US Billboard 200	4
US Soundtrack Albums (Billboard)	1

==== Year-end charts ====
Chart (2017)	Position
Australian Albums (ARIA)	9
Austrian Albums (Ö3 Austria)	34
Belgian Albums (Ultratop Flanders)	172
Belgian Albums (Ultratop Wallonia)	195
German Albums (Offizielle Top 100)	62
Mexican Albums (AMPROFON)	64
New Zealand Albums (RMNZ)	42
US Billboard 200	43
US Soundtrack Albums (Billboard)	4
Chart (2018)	Position
Australian Albums (ARIA)	43
Austrian Albums (Ö3 Austria)	72
US Soundtrack Albums (Billboard)	14

=== Certifications ===
Region	Certification	Certified units/sales
Australia (ARIA)	Gold	35,000^{^}
Canada (Music Canada)	2× Platinum	160,000^{‡}
France (SNEP)	Platinum	100,000^{‡}
United Kingdom (BPI)	Platinum	300,000^{‡}
United States (RIAA)	Platinum	1,000,000^{‡}
^{^} Shipments figures based on certification alone.^{‡} Sales+streaming figures based on certification alone.

=== Accolades ===
Year	Award	Category	Result	Ref(s)
2018	Billboard Music Awards	Top Soundtrack	Nominated	

== Guardians of the Galaxy Vol. 2 (Original Score) ==
Guardians of the Galaxy Vol. 2 (Original Score)

Film score by Tyler Bates
- Released: April 21, 2017
- Studio: Abbey Road Studios
- Genre: Film score
- Length: 43:34
- Labels: Hollywood; Marvel Music

Tyler Bates chronology
John Wick: Chapter 2 (2017)	Guardians of the Galaxy Vol. 2 (Original Score) (2017)	Atomic Blonde (2017)

=== Track listing ===
All music composed by Tyler Bates.

No.	Title	Length
1.	"Showtime a-Holes"	1:27
2.	"vs the Abilisk"	2:35
3.	"The Mantis Touch"	1:53
4.	"Space Chase"	3:20
5.	"Family History"	3:48
6.	"Groot Expectations"	1:57
7.	"Mammalian Bodies"	1:50
8.	"Starhawk"	1:49
9.	"Two-Time-Galaxy Savers"	3:01
10.	"I Know Who You Are"	4:20
11.	"Ego"	2:47
12.	"Kraglin and Drax"	1:34
13.	"The Expansion"	1:05
14.	"Mary Poppins and the Rat"	3:07
15.	"Gods"	1:28
16.	"Dad"	2:28
17.	"A Total Hasselhoff"	2:01
18.	"Sisters"	2:05
19.	"Guardians of the Frickin Galaxy"	0:59
Total length:		43:34

==== Charts ====
Charts (2017)	Peak position
UK Official Soundtracks Album Chart	46
