= Lake Shore Drive (album) =

Studio album by Aliotta Haynes Jeremiah
- Released: 1973
- Genre: Soft rock
- Length: 34:06
- Label: Bigfoot Records

Aliotta Haynes Jeremiah chronology
Aliotta Haynes Jeremiah (1971)	Lake Shore Drive (1973)	Slippin' Away (1977)

Singles from Lake Shore Drive
- 1. "Lake Shore Drive (L.S.D.)" / "Snow Queen" Released: 1973

Professional ratings
Review scores
Source	Rating
AllMusic	3/5 stars

Lake Shore Drive is the second album by Chicago-based rock group Aliotta Haynes Jeremiah, released in 1973 on the Big Foot Records label. It is the third album by musicians Mitch Aliotta and Skip Haynes, whose first album was released under the name Aliotta Haynes in 1970.

== Background ==
The album was released shortly after the delayed success of the single "Lake Shore Drive", which had been released in early 1972. As such, over half of the songs on it came from previous recordings. "Uppers and Downers" had appeared on the 1970 album Aliotta Haynes Music during Ted Aliotta's tenure in the band before keyboardist John Jeremiah had joined, while "For Eddie", "Long Time Gone", "Leaving Chicago A.M.F.", and "One Night Stand" were from the latter iteration's first album in 1971.

== "Lake Shore Drive" ==
The title track pays homage to the Chicago boulevard Lake Shore Drive, which extends along Lake Michigan north and south of the downtown area of Chicago for approximately 16 miles. Outside of the Chicago area, the song was generally interpreted as a reference to the drug LSD.

The song was recorded at a session lasting from New Year's Eve 1971 to New Year's Day 1972, along with its B-side "Snow Queen."

In a 1993 interview with WTTW, band member/songwriter Skip Haynes recalled that he never expected "Lake Shore Drive" to become a hit. The initial lukewarm response to the song had discouraged the band from playing it during subsequent performances. When its popularity suddenly exploded in 1973 however, the members found that they could not play the song live because they had forgotten how.

"We had to buy our own album at list price to learn the song. That's how much we knew 'Lake Shore Drive!'"

== Track listing ==
All tracks are written by Skip Haynes, except where noted. Credits adapted from the original LP and sleeve.

Side one
No.	Title	Writer(s)	Length
1.	"Lake Shore Drive"		3:50
2.	"For Eddie"		3:39
3.	"Medley: Long Time Gone / When I Was a Cowboy"	Bob Dylan / Huddie William Ledbetter	5:46
4.	"Uppers and Downers"		3:14

Side two
No.	Title	Writer(s)	Length
5.	"Snow Queen"		4:28
6.	"Leaving Chicago A.M.F."		5:54
7.	"One Night Stand"		3:30
8.	"Last of Night People"	Michael "Mick" Scott	3:45

Notes:

- While the album sleeve's liner notes use the full title of track three, the LP sticker shortens it to "Long Time Gone".
- Similarly, the runtime for track seven is listed as 5:30 on the outer sleeve despite the LP sticker correctly showing a time of 3:30.
- Later compilations have slightly different titles for some songs, with "For Eddie" being spelled "For Eddy" and "Last of Night People" being titled "Last One of the Night People".

== Personnel ==
Adapted from AllMusic and an interview with Skip Haynes. Neither the original album nor its re-releases indicate liner credits.

- Mitch Aliotta – bass, background vocals
- Skip Haynes (Eugene Von Heitlinger) – lead vocals, guitar
- John Jeremiah – piano, vocals (Note: Haynes explicitly stated in an interview that John Jeremiah did not sing on "Lake Shore Drive.")

Additional

- Bob Parisio – drums, vocals
- Tom Radke – drums on "Lake Shore Drive" and "Snow Queen"
- Joe Golan – viola, violin, cello, and string arrangements on "Lake Shore Drive" and "Snow Queen"
