= Lake Shore Drive (song) =

Single by Aliotta Haynes Jeremiah

from the album Lake Shore Drive
- B-side: "Snow Queen"
- Released: 1972; Reissued 1973 (Snow Queen)
- Recorded: December 31, 1971
- Studio: Paragon Recording Studios, Chicago
- Genre: Rock
- Length: 2:48 (single version); 3:50 (album version)
- Label: Bang (single); Snow Queen (Reissue single); Big Foot (album)
- Songwriter: Skip Haynes
- Producer: Scott Gibbs

"Lake Shore Drive" is a song written by Skip Haynes of the American rock group Aliotta Haynes Jeremiah, initially recorded on December 31, 1971, and released on their 1973 Lake Shore Drive album on Big Foot Records. The song is an homage to the famed lakefront highway in Chicago. Despite the fact that "LSD" had long been an abbreviation for the Drive, many people thought the song referred to the hallucinogenic drug lysergic acid diethylamide. Numerous fans of the song and residents of Chicago believe the song paints an accurate musical picture of living and driving in downtown Chicago.

== Lyrics ==
Skip Haynes himself recounts "We started recording the song on December 31, 1971 and finished it on New Years Day 1972".

Despite the fact that lyricist Haynes maintains that the song is not about LSD, the line "Just slippin' on by on L.S.D. / Friday night, trouble bound" has been construed as a double entendre of both driving on Lake Shore Drive and tripping on the drug.

Other references include the lines "Pretty blue lights along the way / Helping you right on by," which some think refers to the blue lights of the Chicago Police Department squad cars that patrol Lake Shore Drive. Another theory for the meaning of the "blue lights" may be the blue lighting of the reversible lanes that used to run down Lake Shore Drive, and have since been removed. Still others remember that, at the time of the song's release Mich Aliotta mentioned that the "...pretty blue lights..." "...shining with a heavenly grace..." were those in the Beehive search light atop the famed Metropolitan Tower on Michigan Ave, directly across Grant Park from Lake Shore Drive. "From rags on up to riches" denoted driving from the south side to the north side. Lyricist Skip Haynes says, "I was a north sider so I usually was 'runnin' south on LSD' looking for a good time." Other lyrics in the song illustrate the physical features of the road and its surroundings: "It starts up north from Hollywood" refers to West Hollywood Avenue, which, running eastbound, becomes Lake Shore Drive, and "A ten-minute drive from the Gold Coast back / Makes you sure you’re pleasure bound" refers to the Gold Coast, a strip of affluent residential housing, hotels, university campuses, and office buildings along the Drive. "Concrete mountains rearing up / Throwing shadows just about five" refers to Chicago's downtown skyscrapers casting their shadows across the Drive as the sun sets in the late afternoon.

"A ten-minute drive from the Gold Coast back / Makes you sure you’re pleasure bound" is described as "The thing to do when going to clubs (Sgt. Peppers, Sitzmark, Barnaby's, Beaver's etc,) on State Street and Rush Street during the late sixties and early seventies was to double (or triple) park in front of the club and go in to hit on the waitresses and listen to the first set from bands like Aliotta Haynes Jeremiah, Aorta, Big Twist, Illinois Speed Press, Mason Proffit, and CTA. When the set was over (the club that inspired the song was Beavers on State Street), one would pile into the car, turn right on Oak Street, turn left at the Drive, shoot the loop at Foster Avenue, then back down to Oak Street, left on State Street, make an illegal U-turn on State and re-double park (with the first ticket you got still under your windshield wiper) in front of Beaver's then go back into the club. This was the perfect amount of time to get high and be peaking just as you walked in and got a drink from the waitress as the band came on for the second set. That's it."

== Personnel ==
- Skip Haynes – lead vocals, guitar
- Mitch Aliotta – bass guitar
- John Jeremiah – piano

== Certifications ==
Region	Certification	Certified units/sales
United Kingdom (BPI) Sales since 2017	Silver	200,000^{‡}
^{‡} Sales+streaming figures based on certification alone.

== Variations ==
When the blizzard of 2011 hit Chicago, many motorists leaving the city were stranded on Lake Shore Drive as weather conditions deteriorated. Within days, Skip Haynes had reworked the lyrics of the song "Lake Shore Drive" and released it as "Snowed on LSD".

Another variation of the song for the holiday season, "Christmas on LSD", was also released on Haynes's website, lakeshoredrivemusic.com.

== Cultural references ==
The song was featured in the 2017 film Guardians of the Galaxy Vol. 2, and was further included on the film's soundtrack album. The song also features in the 2022 film Don't Make Me Go.

Patrick Stump, lead singer of the band Fall Out Boy, performed a live voice/acoustic piano cover of the song at Wrigley Field on 21 June 2023 as part of the opening night of their "So Much for (Tour)Dust" world tour. Fall Out Boy came out of the Chicago hardcore scene in the early 2000s. Stump introduced the cover by telling the crowd: "what am I going to do at Wrigley that means something, y'know? So I thought ... this isn't a song that everybody'll know, but the people that know it will appreciate it."
