= Chicago Half Marathon =

Annual run in Chicago

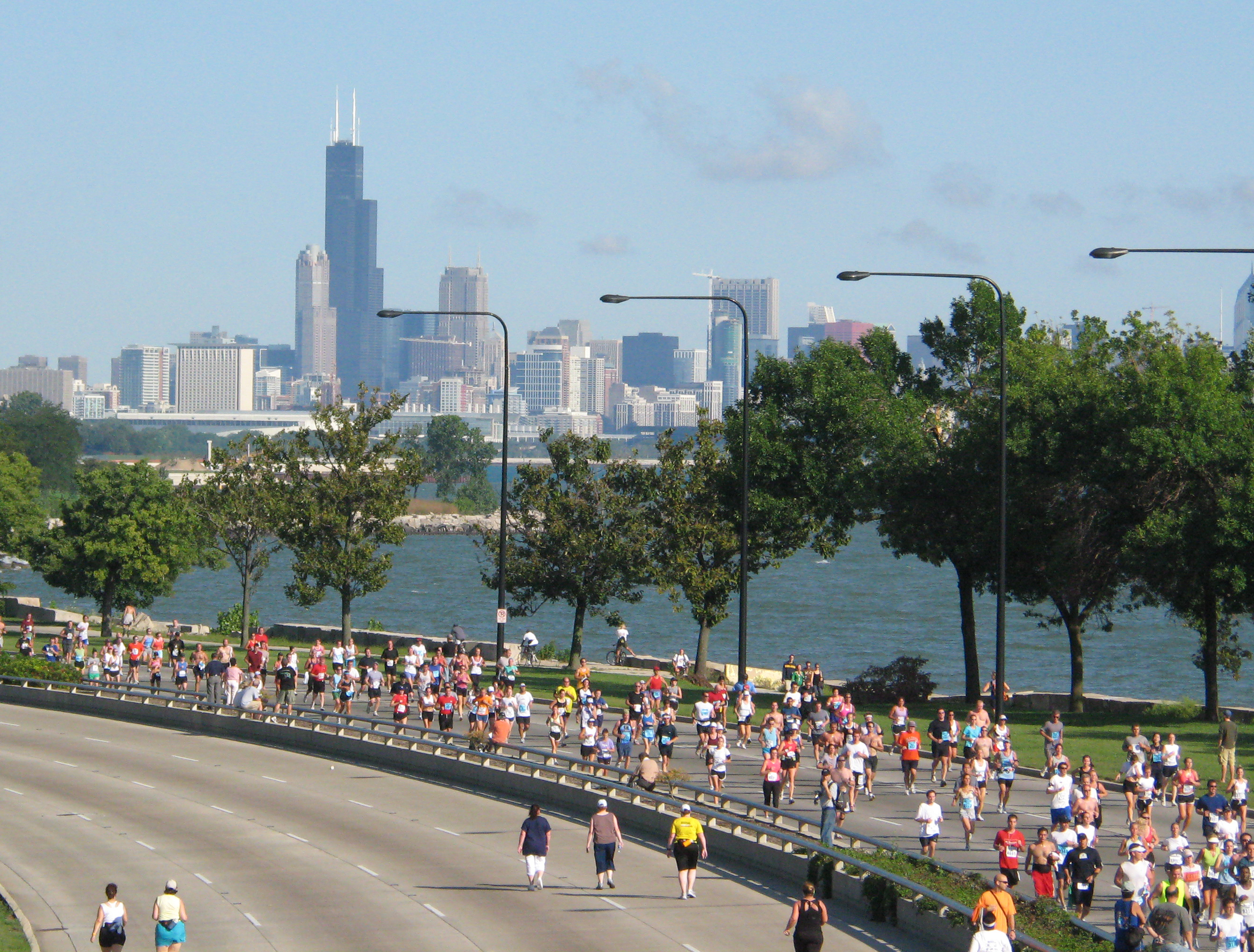
- Runners on Lake Shore Drive in the Kenwood community area on the South Side of Chicago (2007)
- Date: every September
- Location: Chicago, United States
- Event type: Road
- Distance: Half marathon
- Primary sponsor: Life Time
- Established: October 5, 1997
- Website: Official website

The Chicago Half Marathon or Chicago Half Marathon & 5K is an annual half marathon and 5k run occurring in September on the South Side of Chicago. The race takes place on a largely out-and-back course along Lake Shore Drive with views of Lake Michigan and the Chicago skyline.

The race is regarded as a premier half marathon event, with Runner's World naming it as one of the top 10 half marathons in the United States. Susan Nicholl is the race director and founder of the event. With 20,000 registrants and 13,537 finishers in 2009, the race bills itself as the fifth largest half marathon in the United States and the 21st largest road running event in the country.

According to the Chicago Sun-Times, this race is known as "The People's Race".

== Overview ==
The course passes by or through several of the most prominent parts of the Chicago Park District on the South Side including Midway Plaissance, Jackson Park and Burnham Park. The route passes through several community areas: Woodlawn, the South Shore border, Hyde Park, Kenwood, Oakland, and Douglas. The first running October 5, 1997 occurred along the Lake Michigan lakefront and finished in Grant Park. In 1998, the race moved to the South Side course that begins and ends near the Museum of Science and Industry. That year's race, which had 4100 runners, was part of the USA Track & Field state championship series, crowning the state half marathon champions. The race is now listed as one of three half marathons in Chicago.

Some runners, including 2009 winner Patrick Rizzo, use the race to prepare for the Chicago Marathon. Others, such as four-time winner Chris Wehrman, have used it as a tuneup for the New York City Marathon. The 2004 edition of the race, which had 9,000 runners, served as the USA Track and Field State Championship.

The first race, which had over 3000 competitors, was won by Grzegorz Olszowik of Willowbrook, Illinois (1:09.46) and 1996 Marathon Olympian Jenny Spangler of Gurnee, Illinois (1:20.19). Greg Costello won the race three consecutive times from 2006 to 2008. Chris Wehrman won the race 4 times in 5 years between 2000 and 2004. In 2006, Banco Popular became the title sponsor of what was called the Banco Popular Chicago Half Marathon presented by the Illinois Agents of Farmers Insurance. It continued as sponsor until 2008 when the race was known as the Banco Popular Chicago Half Marathon & 5K.

In 2022, the City of Chicago requested that the route be shortened just before the start of the race. A city spokesperson claimed that the change was necessary to “ensure the safety of race participants due to a conflict with vehicles around 31st Street,” which was related to traffic from the Chicago Bears game at Soldier Field. The race organizers did not inform any participants until after the race. The change resulted in a course that was 12.6 miles long.

== Past winners ==
Edition	Year	Men's winner	Time (h:m:s)	Women's winner	Time (h:m:s)
26	2023	Dustin Macuiba (USA)	1:10:20	Whitney Hirano (USA)	1:18:58
25	2022	Matthew Baxter (USA)	1:01:54^{†} (Note: Course cut short, 12.6 miles (not complete half-marathon))	Jessica Hruska (USA)	1:16:53^{†}
24	2021	Henry Mierzwa (USA)	1:08:17	Polina Hodnette (USA)	1:21:32
24	2020	cancelled due to coronavirus pandemic			
23	2019	James Wilson (USA)	1:06:02	Jane Bareikis (USA)	1:16:38
22	2018	Dan Kremske (USA)	1:07:04	Jane Bareikis (USA)	1:17:13
21	2017	Damon King (USA)	1:12:26	Courtney Peterson (USA)	1:23:53
20	2016	Alan Peterson (USA)	1:07:21	Jamie Hershfang (USA)	1:20:32
19	2015	Ian LaBelle (USA)	1:13:09	Kristina Aubert (USA)	1:17:40
18	2014	Keith Bechtol (USA)	1:06:52	Kristen Heckert (USA)	1:17:35
17	2013	Thomas Frazer (USA)	1:07:22	Megan O'Neil (USA)	1:10:18
16	2012	Thomas Frazer (USA)	1:07:12	Meagan Nedlo (USA)	1:18:21
15	2011	Abdelaziz Atmani (MAR)	1:06:03	Becca Prichard (USA)	1:19:07
14	2010	Nathan Krah (USA)	1:07:11	Andrea Pomaranski (USA)	1:13:15
13	2009	Patrick Rizzo (USA)	1:07:48	Melissa White (USA)	1:14:55
12	2008	Greg Costello (USA)	1:07:59	Amanda Domich (USA)	1:20:58
11	2007	Greg Costello (USA)	1:08:11	Suzanne Ryan (USA)	1:21:48
10	2006	Greg Costello (USA)	1:07:03	Stephanie Dueringer (USA)	1:18:01
9	2005	Jeremy Borling (USA)	1:10:16	Courtney Babcock-Key (USA)	1:18:05
8	2004	Chris Wehrman (USA)	1:07:06	Kim Miltz (USA)	1:19:38
7	2003	Andrzey Krzyscin (POL)	1:05:53	Susan Loken (USA)	1:19:12
6	2002	Chris Wehrman (USA)	1:06:57	Kim Miltz (USA)	1:21:12
5	2001	Chris Wehrman (USA)	1:07:31	Lorraine Masuoka (USA)	1:19:13
4	2000	Chris Wehrman (USA)	1:08:02	Ann Schaefers-Coles (USA)	1:20:03
3	1999	Grzegorz Olszowik (POL)	1:07:57	Cindy James (USA)	1:22:40
2	1998	Mark Jung-Beeman (USA)	1:09:51	Cindy James (USA)	1:17:13
