= Ohio Street =

Street in downtown Chicago

- 600 North
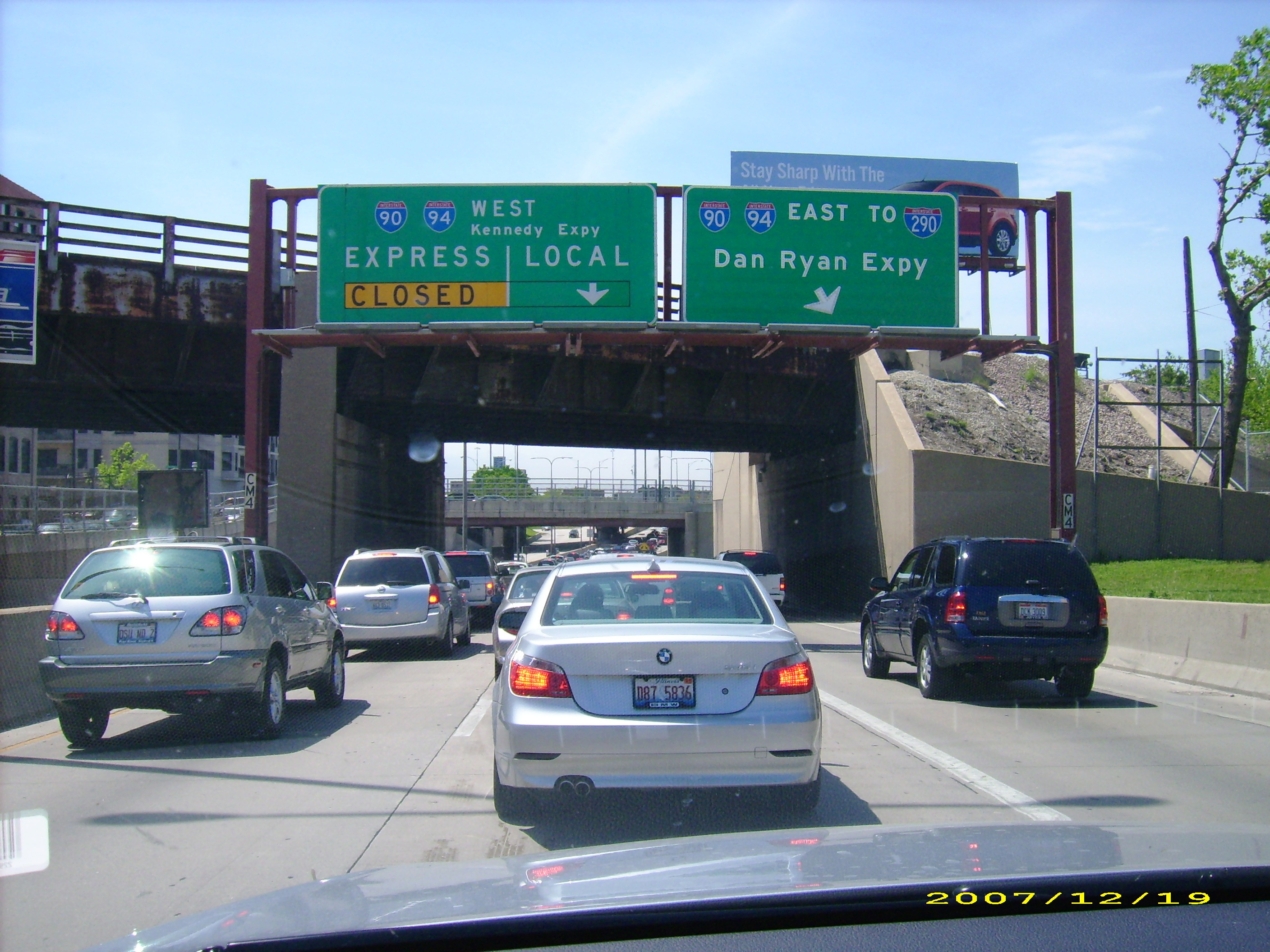
- Ohio Street feeder ramp east of I-90/I-94
- Location: Maywood, Chicago
- West end: 4th Avenue in Maywood
- East end: US 41 (Lake Shore Drive)

Ohio Street is a major east–west one-way street in downtown Chicago. From west to east, it runs from an interchange with Interstate 90 (I-90) and I-94, also known as the Kennedy Expressway, to U.S. Route 41 (US 41), also known as Lake Shore Drive, just west of Lake Michigan.

== Route description ==
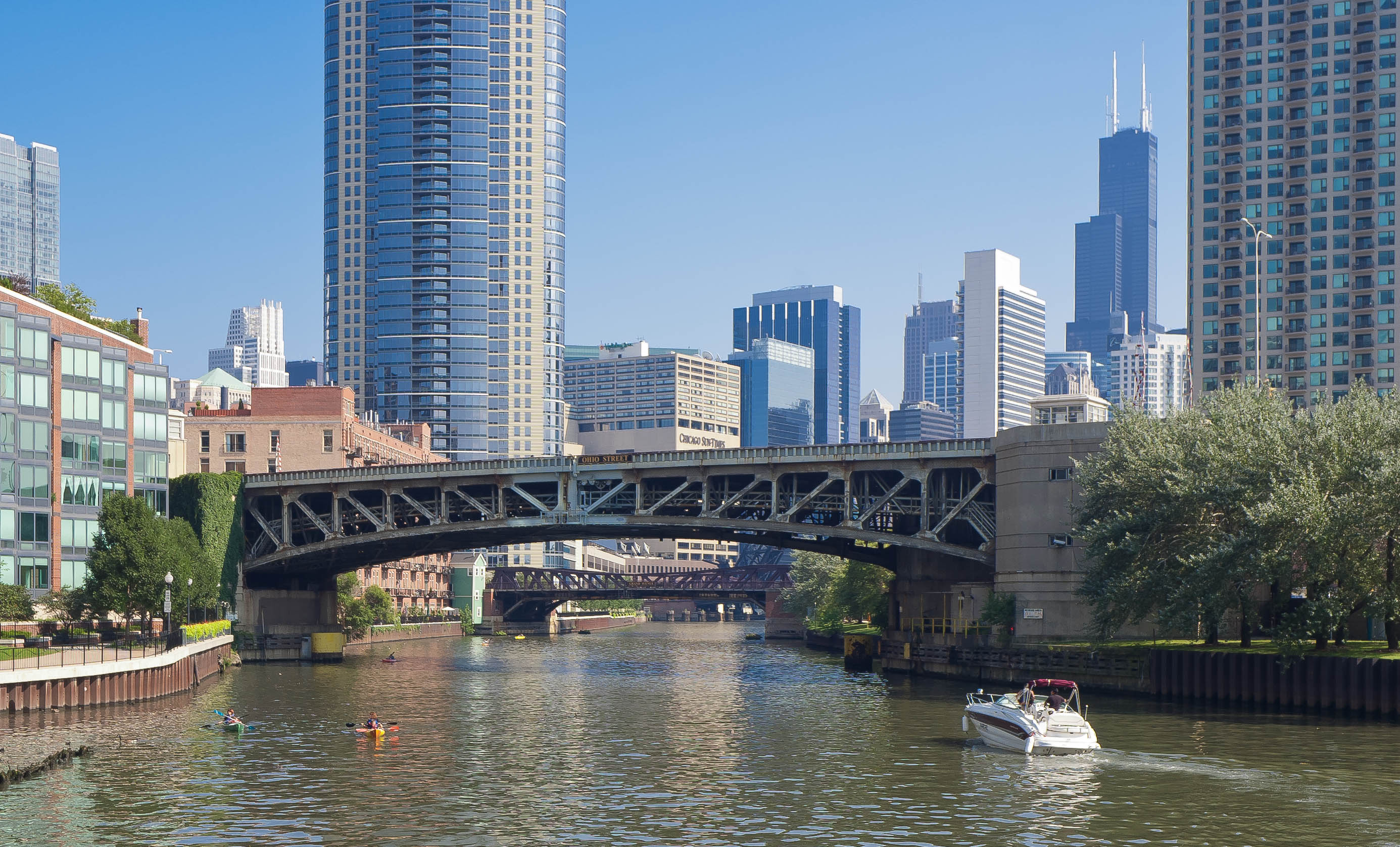
Ohio Street bridge over the Chicago River

Ohio Street begins at an interchange with the Kennedy Expressway (I-90/I-94) in the northwestern portion of downtown Chicago. It then passes under Milwaukee Avenue and Halsted Street before crossing the North Branch of the Chicago River. At this point, where the road intersects Orleans Street, the eastbound lanes continue as a one-way street, while the westbound lanes split off to form its westbound counterpart, Ontario Street, which is located at 630 North. Continuing east, Ohio Street intersects LaSalle Street, Clark Street, State Street, Michigan Avenue (also known as the Magnificent Mile), and Fairbanks Court. At its intersection with McClurg Court, the building 400 East Ohio Street stands 505 feet (154 m) tall with 50 floors. Ohio Street finally intersects US 41, its eastern terminus also known as Lake Shore Drive.
