= Batdorf & Rodney =

American folk rock duo

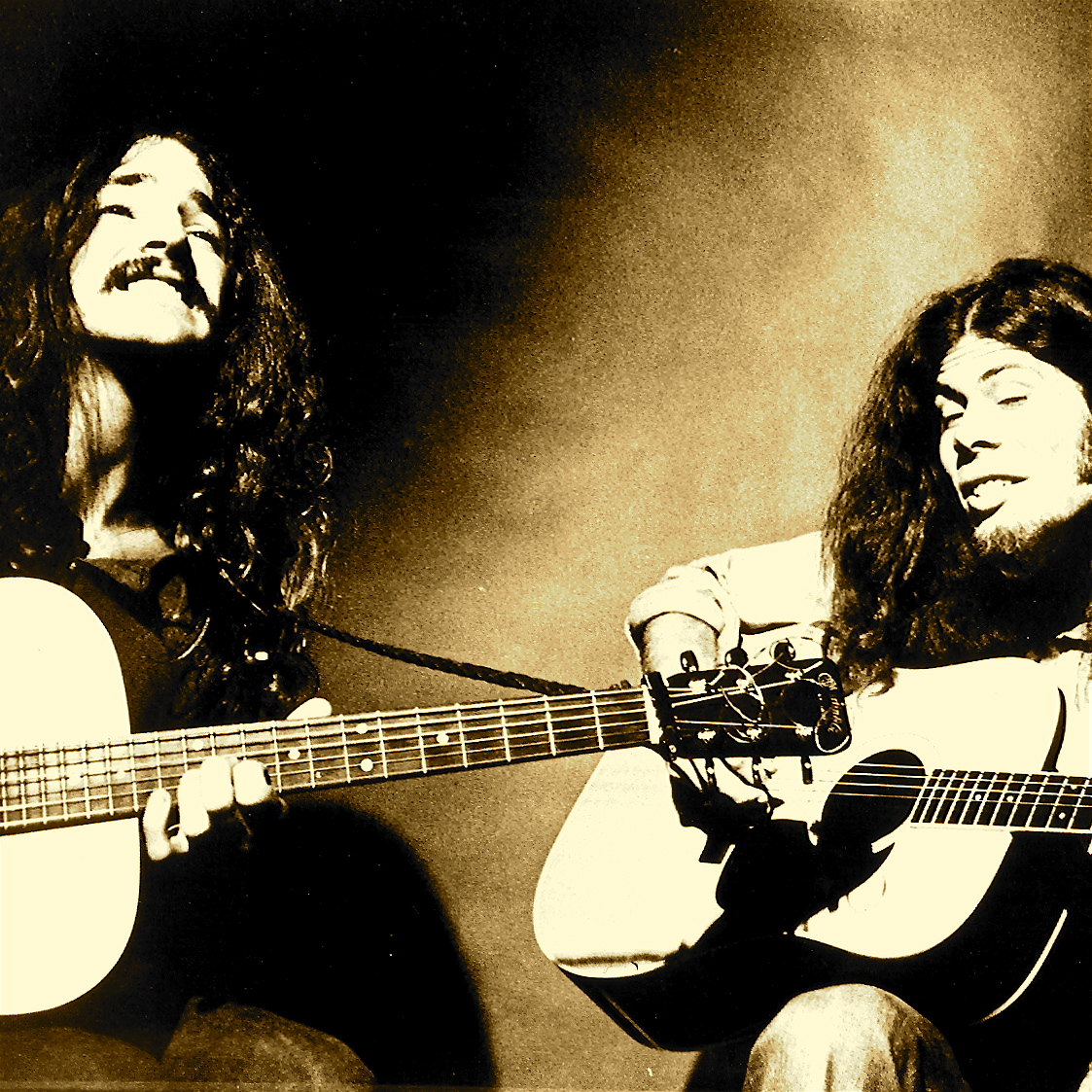
- John Batdorf (left) and Mark Rodney in 1971

Background information
- Origin: Los Angeles, California, United States
- Genres: Country rock; folk rock; soft rock
- Years active: 1970–1975, 2007–2008
- Labels: Atlantic; Asylum; Arista; BatMac
- Past members: John Batdorf; Mark Rodney

Batdorf & Rodney were an early-1970s folk rock duo consisting of John Batdorf and Mark Rodney.

== Career ==
The two began performing in the summer of 1970 in Las Vegas. They toured extensively with many of the most famous acts of the 1970s. Their tours included playing at Carnegie Hall. They issued three albums on three different labels between 1971 and 1975, logging two chart hits during their final year after signing with Arista Records. Their self-titled second album featured the track "Home Again," an FM radio staple that at 6:30 was perhaps too long to be a hit single. A track from their third album, "You Are a Song," written by Jim Weatherly, was released as a single and reached number 87 on the U.S. Billboard Hot 100 during the summer of 1975. It also reached #19 on the Canadian Adult Contemporary chart.

Their other hit, a non-album single, was an early version of "Somewhere in the Night," which reached number 69 in December of that year. Issued concurrently with Helen Reddy's version, the song became a Top 40 hit for her in 1976 and a Top 10 hit for Barry Manilow in 1979. Another song, "All I Need," reached the Canadian Adult Contemporary chart in 1973, peaking at #79.

=== Dissolution ===
Their third album, recorded under Arista Records with Clive Davis, faced creative differences. While Davis pushed for more commercially viable songs, Batdorf & Rodney were reluctant, feeling it compromised their artistic integrity. Internal strains and management changes eventually led to the duo's breakup in 1975.

=== After the break-up and reunion ===
Remaining with Arista, Batdorf soon formed the group Silver then released "Wham Bam" in 1976, the most successful single of his career, which reached #16 on the Billboard Hot 100. In 2007, the duo reunited to record an album titled Still Burnin'.

== Discography ==
=== Studio albums ===
Title	Details	Peak chart positions
Title	Details	US
Off The Shelf	Released: 1971; Label: Atlantic Records	—
Batdorf & Rodney	Released: 1972; Label: Asylum Records	185
Life Is You	Released: 1975; Label: Arista Records	140
Still Burnin'	Released: 2007; Label: BatMac	—
"—" denotes releases that did not chart.

=== Singles ===
Year	Single	Peak chart positions		Album
Year	Single	US	CA AC	Album
1971	"Oh My Surprise"	—	—	Off The Shelf
1972	"Simone"	—	—	Non-album Single
1972	"All I Need"	—	79	Batdorf & Rodney
1972	"Home Again"	—	—	Batdorf & Rodney
1975	"You Are A Song"	87	19	Life Is You
1975	"Life Is You"	—	—	Life Is You
1975	"Somewhere in the Night"	69	—	Non-album Single
"—" denotes releases that did not chart.
