= John Batdorf =

American singer-songwriter

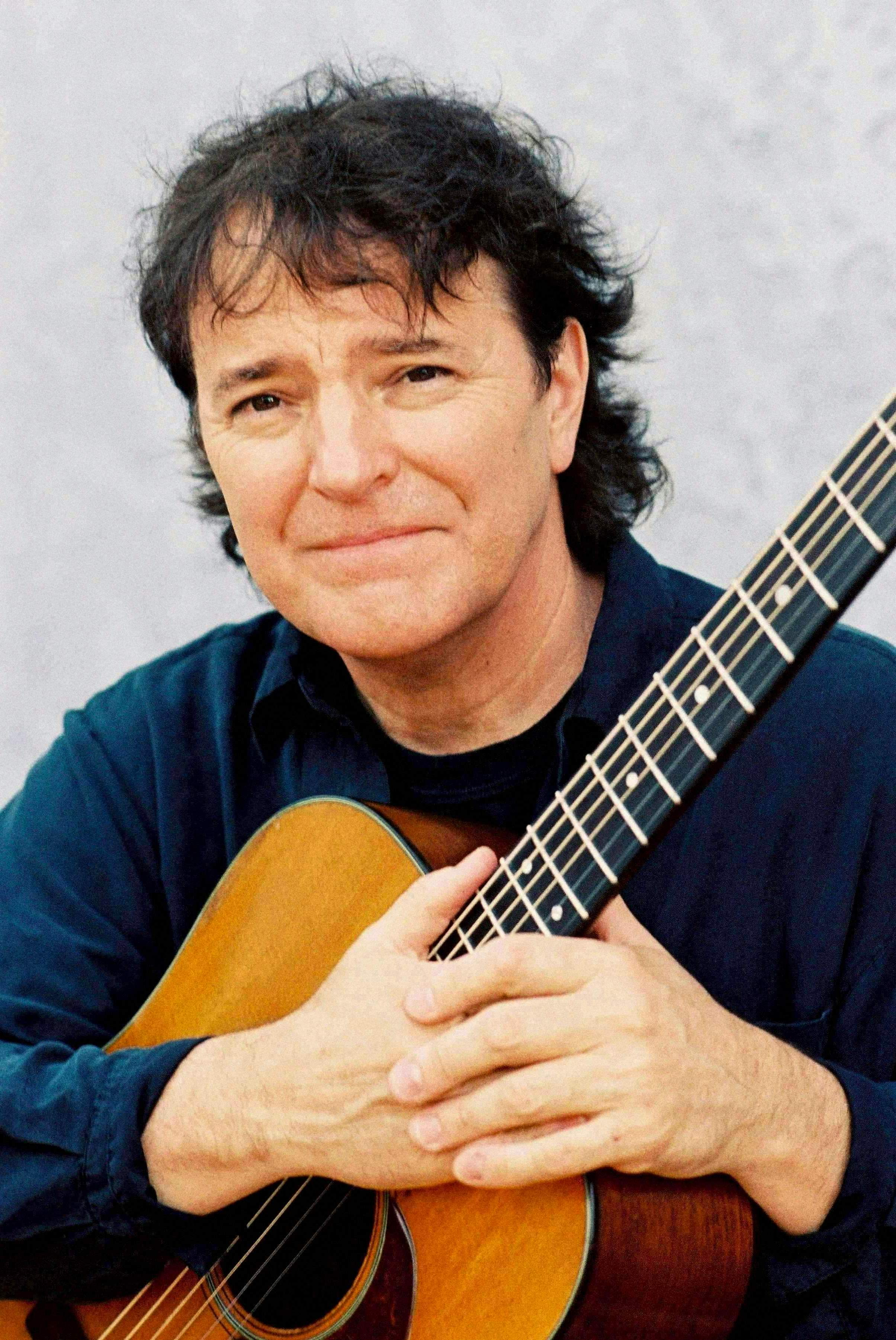

Background information
- Born: John Lee Batdorf; March 26, 1952 (age 74); Springfield, Ohio, U.S.
- Genres: Country rock; folk rock; soft rock
- Occupations: Musician; songwriter
- Instruments: Guitar; vocals; piano
- Years active: 1967–present
- Formerly of: Batdorf & Rodney; Silver
- Website: Official website

John Lee Batdorf (born March 26, 1952) is an American singer and songwriter from Yellow Springs, Ohio. He is the nephew of Earl Batdorf, aka Earl Scott, a country singer who had several hits chart during the mid-1960s.

== Early life ==
Born in Springfield, Ohio John Batdorf comes from a musical family; as a young boy he had originally aspired to play professional baseball. However, those dreams were crushed after he had osteomyelitis, an infection of the bone marrow in the right hip, at age 11. He was in a full body cast for a year and told that he would not be able to play competitive sports. He picked up a guitar out of boredom and began to learn it, then piano, giving him musical aspirations.

== Career ==
Batdorf's musical career began in 1967 after moving to Los Angeles.

=== Batdorf & Rodney ===
He joined with Mark Rodney in 1971 to form the duo Batdorf & Rodney. Their biggest hit was "Somewhere in the Night" (U.S. #69, 1975).

=== Silver ===
After the breakup of Batdorf & Rodney in 1975, he formed the group Silver, with whom he had his biggest hit, "Wham Bam" (U.S. #16, 1976). He sings lead on the song, which was their only hit. "Wham Bam" was revived by appearing in 2017's blockbuster movie, Guardians of the Galaxy Vol. 2. It has nearly 18 million plays on YouTube.

=== Music and other ventures ===
Batdorf has also had success as a film and TV composer with credits from Touched by an Angel, Promised Land, Book Of Days and The Best Two Years, He has been a session vocalist on several hit records and commercials in addition to a songwriter for Kim Carnes, England Dan, and the band America.

=== Batdorf & McLean ===
In 1997 Batdorf formed Batdorf & McLean with Michael McLean, with whom he had collaborated earlier as arranger and vocalist and they released an album, Don't You Know. In 2012, the two made Soundtrax2Recovery.

=== Batdorf & Rodney reunion and then solo career ===
In 2006, Batdorf released a solo album, Home Again, reuniting him with Mark Rodney for some of the tracks. The album has several Batdorf & McLean compositions. Since the release, Batdorf has released Old Man Dreamin’, One Last Wish, Beep Beep, Next Stop Willoughby, Me And My Guitar, Last Summer, An Extraordinary Ordinary Life, and his most recent 2022 release, Side II.
