= Lake Shore Drive =

Expressway in Chicago, Illinois

DuSable Lake Shore Drive
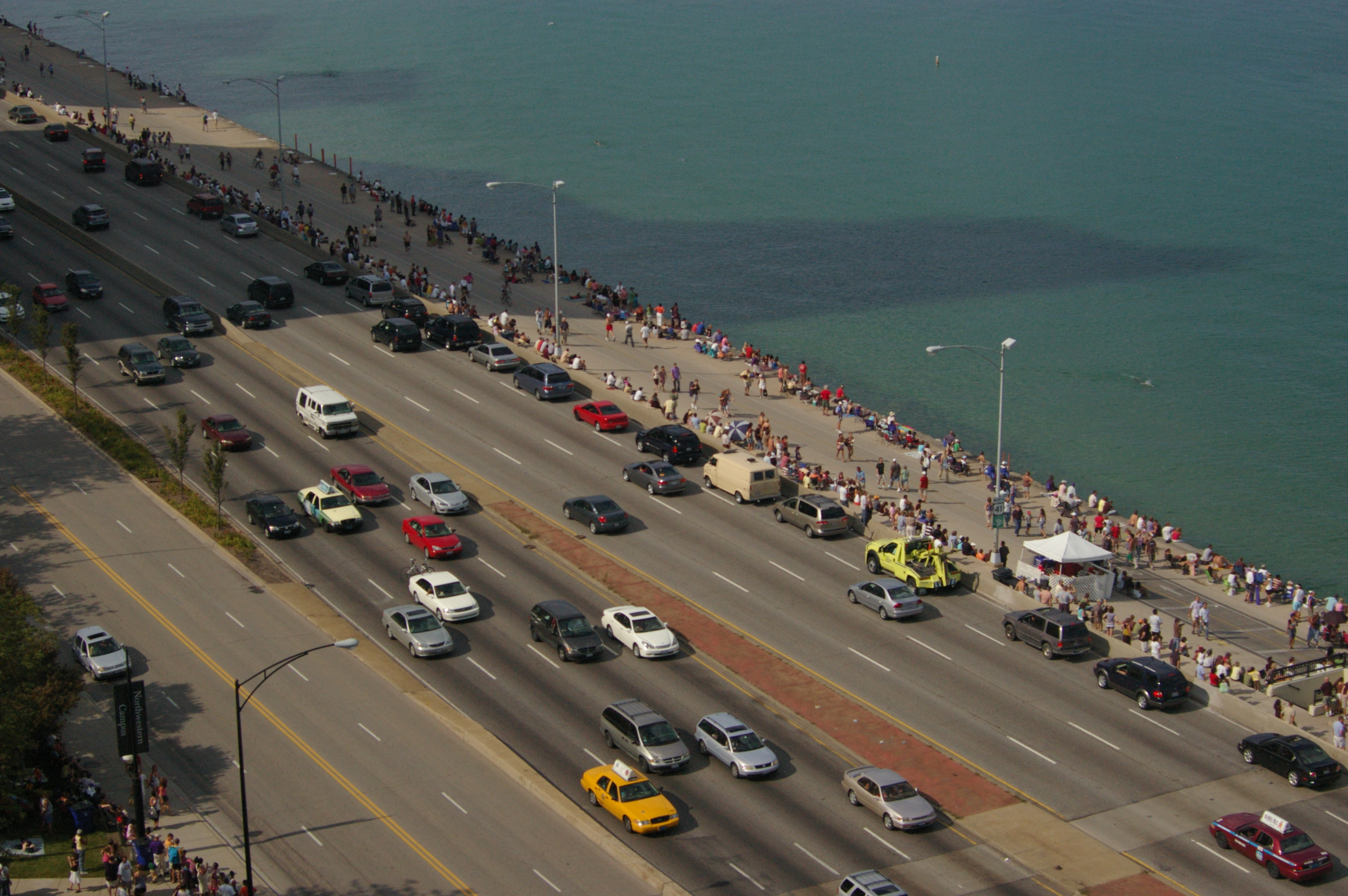
- View of Lake Shore Drive taken from the Rubloff building, near the Lake Michigan shoreline
- Original portion of Lake Shore Drive in red 2013 extension in dark green
- Part of: US 41 / LMCT for most of its length
- Length: 15.83 mi (25.48 km) (Original 1937 section only; not including the 2013 extension)
- South end: Marquette Drive and Jeffery Drive (6600 South)
- North end: Hollywood Avenue (5700 North)

Construction
- Completed: 1937
- Inauguration: 1946; 80 years ago

Lake Shore Drive (formally Jean Baptiste Point DuSable Lake Shore Drive; also known as DuSable Lake Shore Drive, the Outer Drive, the Drive, LSD or DLSD) is a semi-limited access expressway that runs alongside the shoreline of Lake Michigan and its adjacent parkland and beaches in Chicago, Illinois. Except for the portion north of Foster Avenue (5200 North), the Drive is designated part of U.S. Highway 41. A portion of the highway on the Outer Drive Bridge and its bridge approaches is multilevel.

On June 25, 2021, the Chicago City Council approved a compromise ordinance renaming the outer portion of Lake Shore Drive for the city's first non-indigenous settler, Jean Baptiste Point du Sable.

The Lakefront Trail, an 18-mile (29 km) multi-use trail, parallels Lake Shore Drive on the east side for most of its length. Pedestrians can access the lake at numerous points all along Lake Shore Drive through underpasses and overpasses that connect the lake with the city's lakefront neighborhoods. For much of its length north and south, it has a landscaped median separating directional traffic. It prominently runs street level through eastern Grant Park and then around the Museum Campus, past McCormick Place convention center, where it provides the terminal interchange of Interstate 55. It runs north through most of Lincoln Park and south through Burnham Park and Jackson Park.

== Route description ==
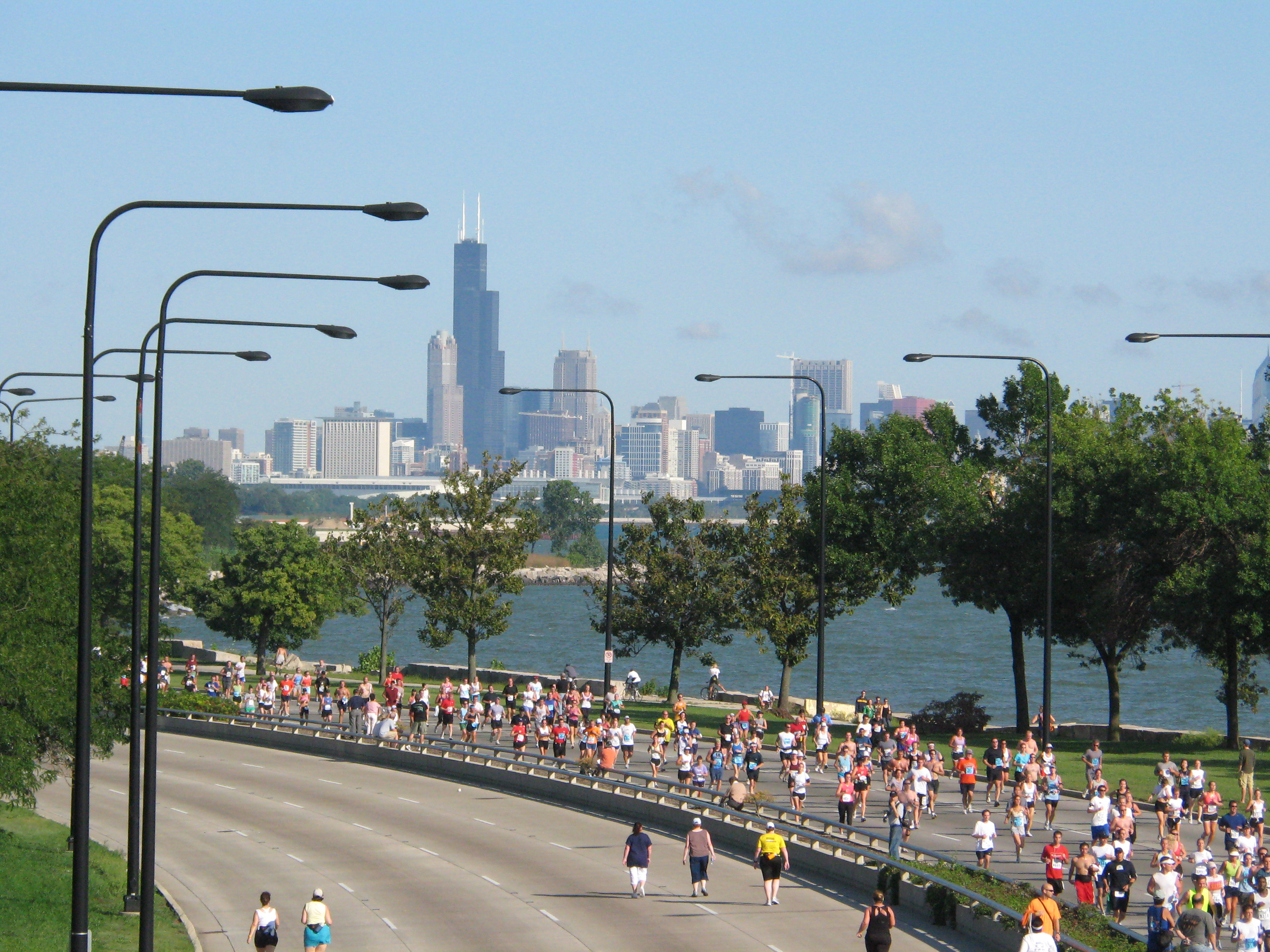
The Chicago Half Marathon is an annual Chicago Marathon tune up that takes place along Lake Shore Drive on the South Side

The southern portion of Lake Shore Drive begins at the intersection of Ewing Avenue (US 41), Harbor Avenue, and Mackinaw Avenue. Lake Shore Drive runs through the former South Works steel plant as a four-lane divided highway, effectively bypassing the built-up area in South Chicago. Lake Shore Drive ends at the intersection of 79th Street and South Shore Drive; US 41 continues north through South Shore via South Shore Drive.

The main section of Lake Shore Drive begins at the intersection of Jeffery Drive and Marquette Drive. After 57th Street, Lake Shore Drive becomes an expressway. Exits to Hyde Park Boulevard and 53rd Street are only accessible for southbound traffic. The interchange design at 47th Street is unusual as traffic would exit or enter on the left side of northbound Lake Shore Drive instead of on the right side. South of McCormick Place, Lake Shore Drive meets I-55 at a Y-interchange, where I-55 begins/ends. There was once an inverted SPUI north of I-55; however, the overpass became pedestrianized and became part of McCormick Place in the mid-1990s, leading to the closure of this interchange. That same year, northbound traffic on Lake Shore Drive shifted west onto its current configuration west of Soldier Field and Museum Campus.

The controlled-access portion ceases between Waldron Drive and Monroe Drive and again at Chicago Avenue. Lake Shore Drive briefly becomes double-decked between Randolph Street and Grand Avenue. The upper deck facilitates expressway-like traffic, while the lower deck facilitates local traffic. After intersecting with Chicago Avenue, Lake Shore Drive travels in a sharp reverse curve at Oak Street Beach before returning to controlled-access once again. In Uptown, three diamond interchanges are spaced 1/4 mile (0.40 km) apart. US 41 leaves Lake Shore Drive at an interchange with Foster Avenue. The expressway continues north, serving Bryn Mawr Avenue, before ending at Hollywood Avenue/Sheridan Road in the Edgewater neighborhood.

=== Outer Drive and Inner Drive ===
Outer Drive, signed as DuSable Lake Shore Drive, is a limited-access road that runs north from Marquette Drive in Jackson Park to Hollywood Avenue in the Edgewater neighborhood. The outer drive limits the ability of pedestrians to access the lake directly from the street grid. Trucks are prohibited on Outer Drive except for a section between I-55 and 31st Street.

The original Inner Drive, signed as Lake Shore Drive, is used for slower local traffic and is connected to the street grid. The local drive runs from downtown in Streeterville to LaSalle Drive, (becoming Cannon Drive). Then the inner drive reappears just south of Diversey Parkway, continuing north to Irving Park Road. The portion from Belmont to just south of Irving Park was previously named Sheridan Road (which can still be seen carved in stone in at least one vintage high-rise).

=== Link Bridge ===
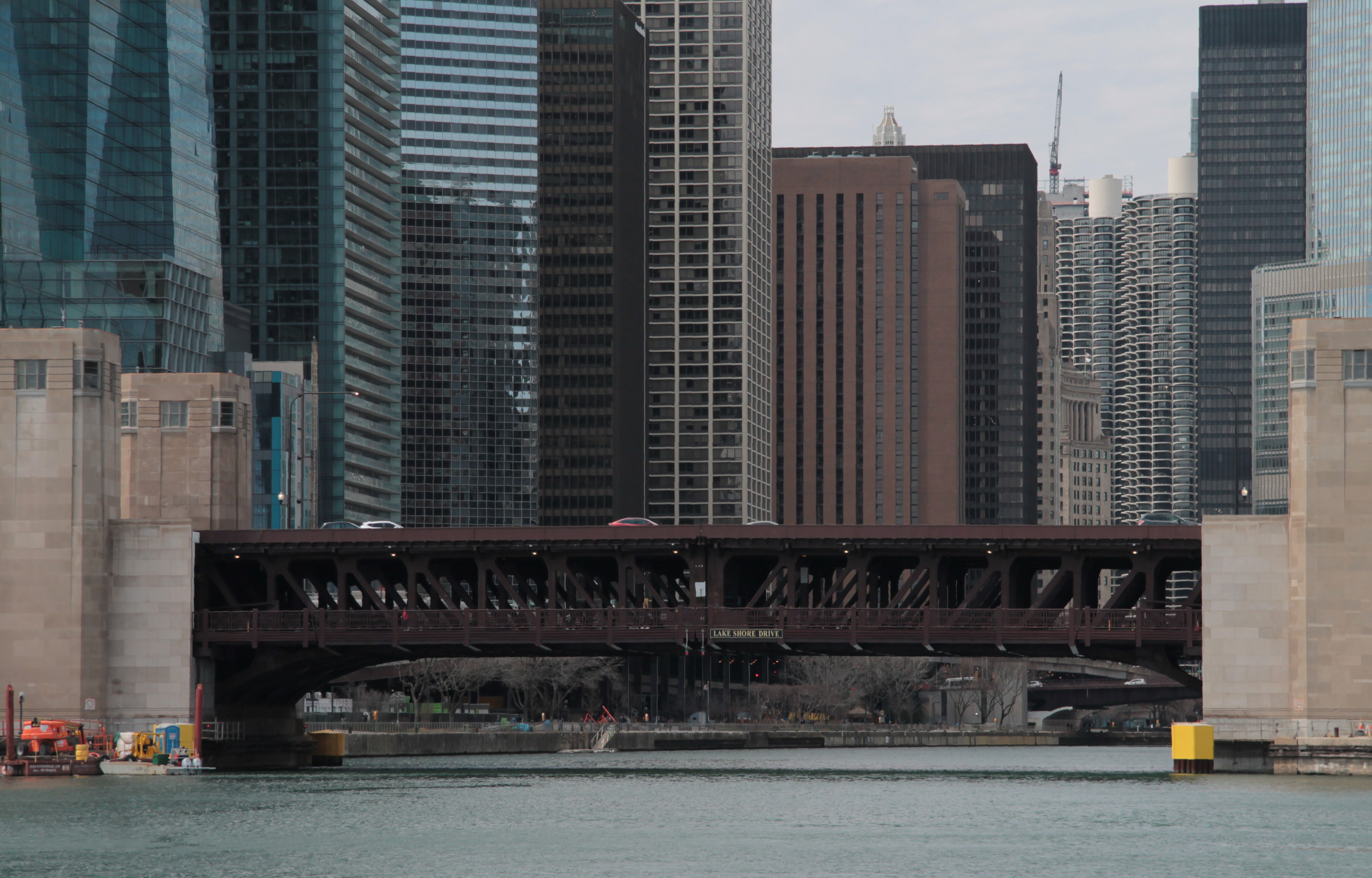
The Outer Drive Bridge from Lake Michigan.

The Outer Drive Bridge, also known as the Link Bridge, is the official name of the bridge carrying the Lake Shore Drive portion of US 41 over the main branch of the Chicago River. It is designed as a bascule bridge, and is one of only two in the city to have an upper and lower deck, both dedicated to automobile traffic (the other being on Michigan Avenue). The Wells Street Bridge and Lake Street Bridge also have two levels, but the upper level is for elevated train traffic into the Loop.

The Link Bridge was constructed in 1937. At the time of its construction, it was considered to be both the widest and longest bascule bridge in the world.

== History ==
=== Origin and extension of Lake Shore Drive ===
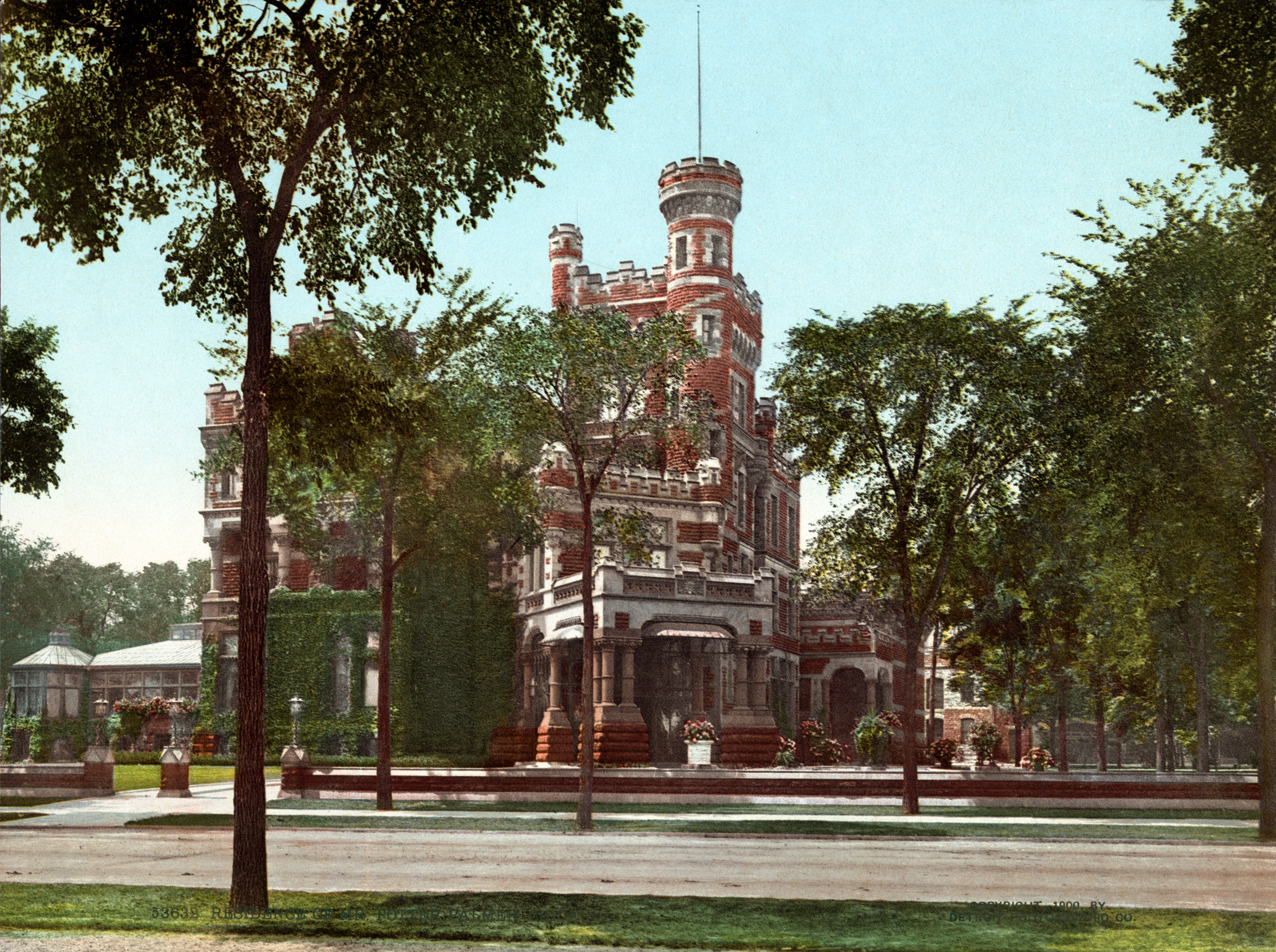
The Palmer Mansion fronted the drive and spurred development of the "Gold Coast"

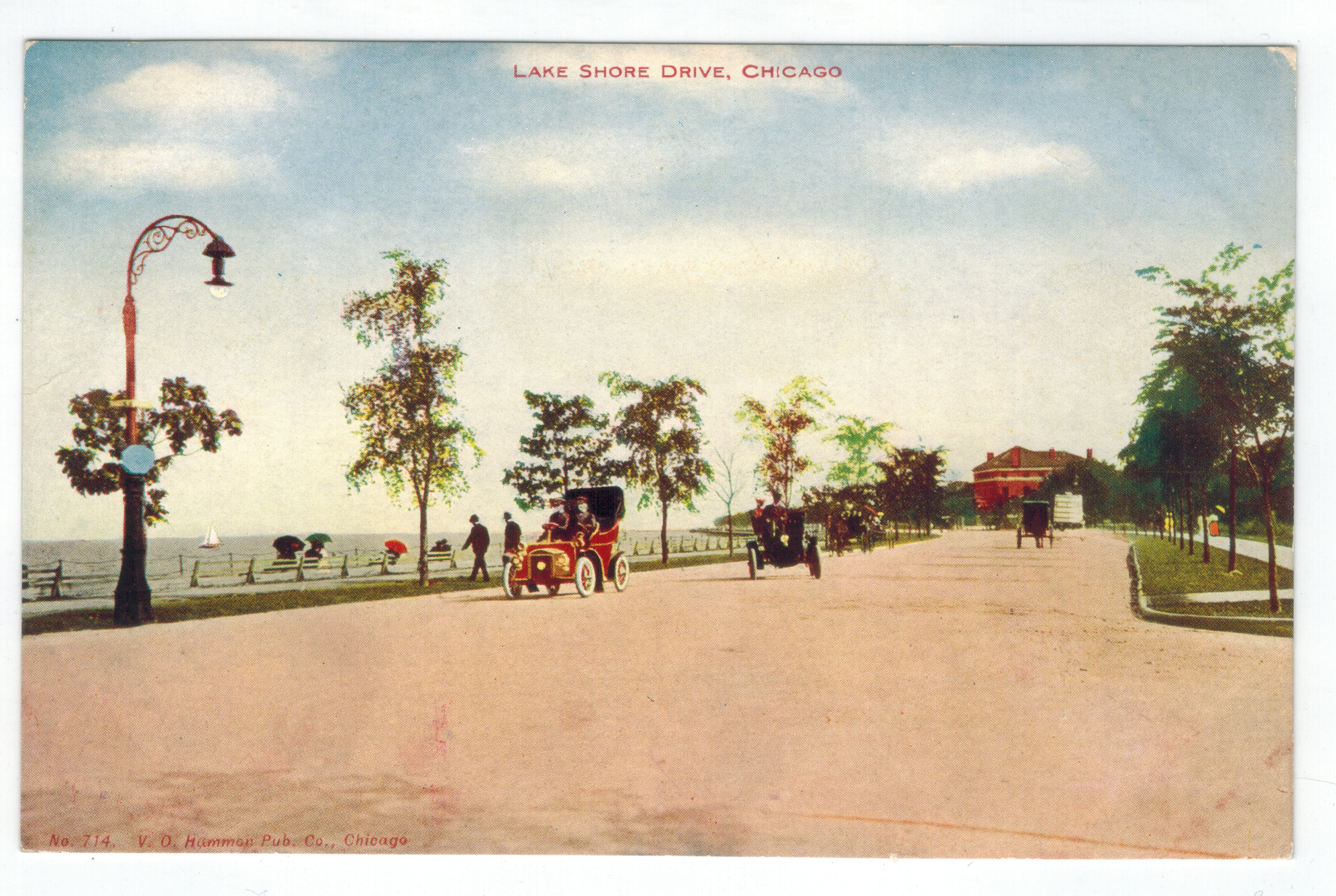
Lake Shore Drive circa 1920

Lake Shore Drive's origins date back to Potter Palmer, who coerced the city to build the street adjacent to his lakefront property to enhance its value. Palmer built his "castle" at 1350 N. Lake Shore Drive in 1882. The drive was originally intended for leisurely strolls for the wealthy in their carriages, but as the auto age dawned it took on a different role completely.

In 1927, the roadway's southern portion from the Chicago River to 57th Street was signed as Leif Ericson Drive after the Norse explorer. It was also known as Field Boulevard.

The road was extended from Belmont Avenue (3200n) north to Foster Avenue (5200n) in 1933. Landfill was used for this extension, mostly made of dirt.

In 1937, the double-decker Link Bridge (officially the Outer Drive Bridge) over the Chicago River opened, along with viaducts over rail yards and other industrial areas connecting to both ends of it. The lower level was intended for a railroad connection. At the time the bridge was built, it was the longest and widest bascule bridge in the world. The Lake Shore Drive (Outer Drive) and Link Bridge Photograph Album, c1937, documents the bridge's construction. The album is held by the Ryerson & Burnham Libraries at the Art Institute of Chicago. North of the river, LSD intersected Ohio Street at grade, and then passed over Grand Avenue and Illinois Street on its way to the bridge South of the river. LSD came from the south on its current alignment, but continued straight at the curve north of Monroe Street, rising onto a viaduct. It intersected Randolph Street at grade and then continued north above the Illinois Central Railroad's yard. At the river, it made a sharp turn to the right, and another sharp turn to the left onto the bridge.

Leif Ericson Drive was resigned as Lake Shore Drive in 1946.

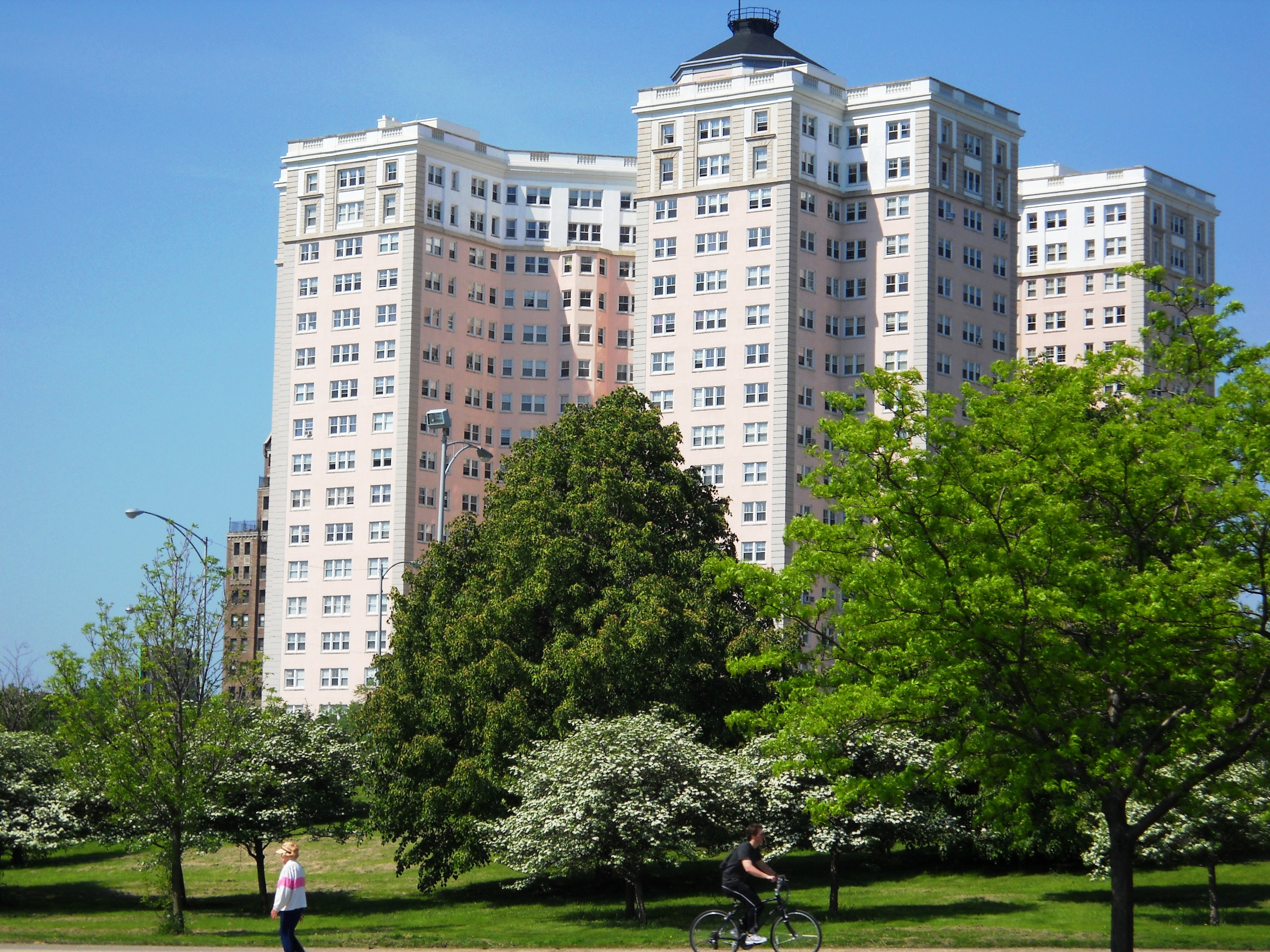
The Historic Edgewater Beach Apartments mark the northern end of the Drive

In the 1950s, the road was extended — first briefly to Bryn Mawr (5600n) and then in 1957 to Hollywood Avenue (5700n). The road included rubble and debris from the destruction of homes razed for the construction of the Congress Expressway (now the Eisenhower Expressway).

Prior to the extension to Hollywood, traffic was funneled onto Foster, then north onto Sheridan Road, which still remains a wide 4-lane street to this day, though most traffic doesn't rejoin Sheridan until LSD ends at Hollywood Avenue now. Sheridan Road south of Foster narrows to 2 lanes of traffic with street parking on each side as well.

=== Upgrades to Lake Shore Drive ===
In 1936, the Public Works Administration provided funding toward upgrading Lake Shore Drive between Ohio Street and North Avenue as well as between Belmont Avenue and Byron Street. Three years later, the Works Progress Administration provided an additional $1,250,000 (equivalent to $28,900,000 in 2025) toward constructing interchanges along the stretch being upgraded. This upgrade was completed in 1940.

In the 1950s, a section of Lake Shore Drive between 23rd Street and 47th Street was rebuilt as an expressway.

Interstate 494
- Location: Chicago, Illinois
- Existed: 1950s–1966

In the 1950s and 1960s, Illinois and Cook County presented plans for an Interstate 494 to run along part of LSD. I-494 was initially planned to run from the Chicago Skyway at Stony Island Avenue to the Kennedy Expressway at the Ohio Street feeder ramp. The freeway would travel along Stony Island Avenue, Lake Shore Drive, and Ohio Street, bisecting Jackson Park in the process. Later, it was planned to connect south towards the currently-named Bishop Ford Freeway. The extension of a proposed freeway would have continued south along Stony Island Avenue, including the present-day feeder ramp, connecting to present-day Bishop Ford Freeway. An I-494 proposal was also considered around the same time for the Crosstown Expressway. In 1966, the I-494 designation was relocated to the Crosstown Expressway. At the same time, further extensions and upgrades on the freeway were canceled.

At the junction with Michigan Avenue, an interchange was built from 1964 to Summer 1965 to replace the at-grade intersection.

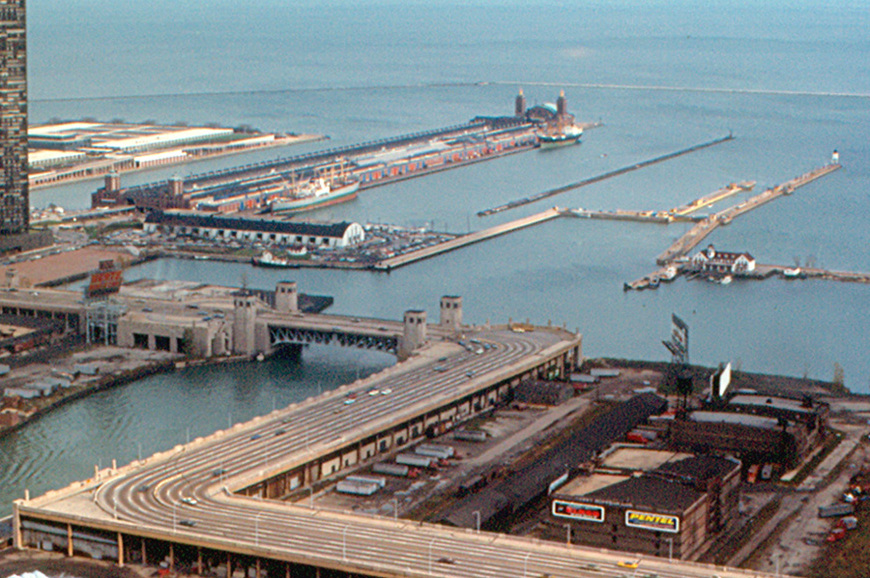
The S-Curve and Link Bridge, 1970

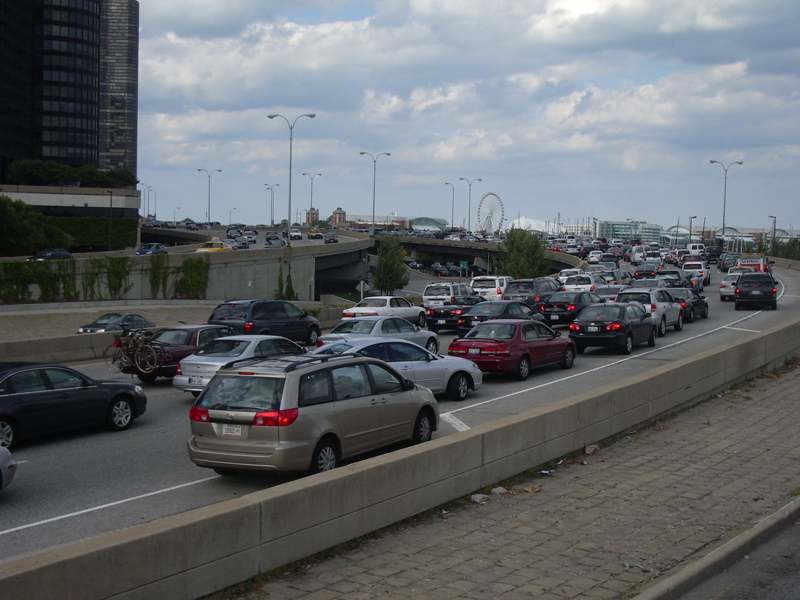
Traffic near Harbor Point Tower

When Wacker Drive was extended east to LSD in the early 1970s, its upper level ended at LSD at the west curve (the lower level dead-ended underneath). A new development at the northeast corner of the Randolph Street intersection resulted in an extension of Randolph across LSD.

A reversible lane was added to part of the road in 1976.

Construction began in 1982 on a realignment of LSD south of the river (along with a reconstruction north of the river). A whole new alignment was built, greatly smoothing the S-curve just south of the river. The northbound side opened in October 1985, and the southbound side opened in November 1986. A new lower level was built, using the lower level of the bridge, and providing access to the new Wacker Drive and the roads on the north side of the river. The old road south of Randolph later became the Richard and Annette Bloch Cancer Survivors Garden: the east–west part was reconstructed as part of Wacker Drive (which was being rebuilt at the time). The rest, between Randolph and Wacker, was kept for several years as Field Boulevard but was demolished in 1994. Only some old street lighting, sidewalks & fire hydrants remain, marking the former route. Current plans are for new upper-level streets in the area as part of the Lakeshore East development.

On November 10, 1996, new northbound lanes opened next to the original southbound lanes at Soldier Field, eliminating the original wide median. Prior to this 1996 reconstruction, the northbound lane ran on the east side of Soldier Field while the southbound lane ran on the west side.

=== Contemporary ===
On March 20, 2003, some 15,000 anti-war protesters marched along Lake Shore Drive the day after the United States invasion of Iraq, stopping all traffic for several hours. The spontaneous direct action occurred after the original protest route through downtown Chicago, as planned by the Chicago Coalition Against War & Racism, was blocked by law enforcement. Approximately 900 marchers were arrested and a City Council investigation was held before all charges were dropped.

Portions of the drive between Irving Park Road and Foster Avenue that contained the original concrete were paved with asphalt in 2009.

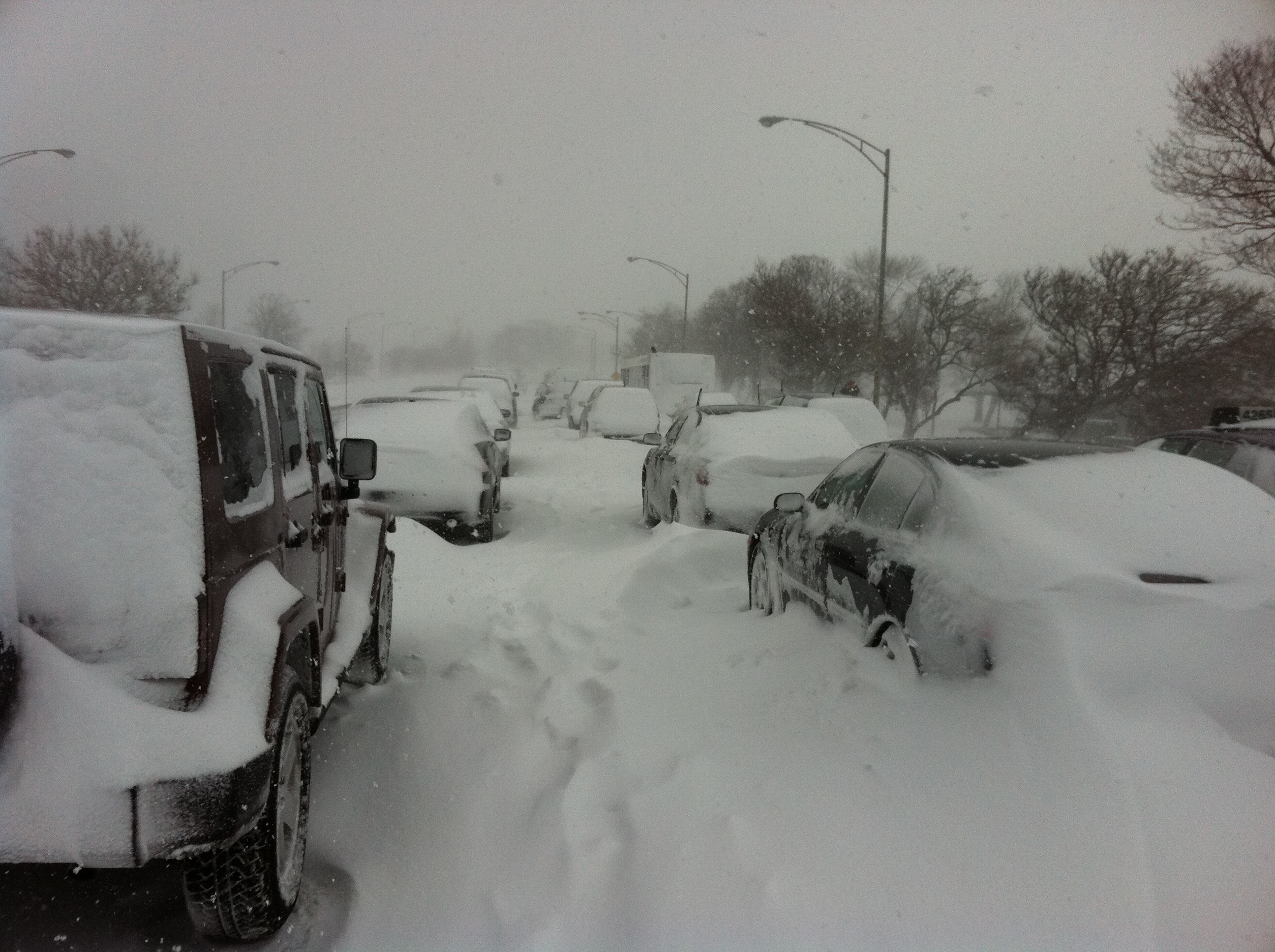
Cars snowed in on Lake Shore Drive during the Groundhog Day Blizzard in 2011

During the Groundhog Day Blizzard, Lake Shore Drive had to be closed because of the large amount of snow present on the roadway. The city estimated 900 vehicles became stuck on Lake Shore Drive, with the Associated Press reporting approximately 1,500 vehicles stuck. Hundreds of motorists had become stranded on Lake Shore Drive, some for as long as 12 hours. Crews worked around the clock to remove the vehicles and clear the roadway, and Lake Shore Drive was reopened just before dawn on February 3, 2011.

A thirty-year development plan estimated to cost $4 billion was approved by Chicago in September 2010, for the former site of the US Steel plant in South Chicago, which operated along the neighborhood's shoreline from 1880 to 1992, and which has undergone extensive demolition and environmental remediation since; included in the plan was an extension of Lake Shore Drive through the property. This extension opened at 9 am October 27, 2013.

Between late 2015 and late 2017, the I-55 interchange was reconstructed to replace all of the ramps. These structures were deteriorating and functionally obsolete.

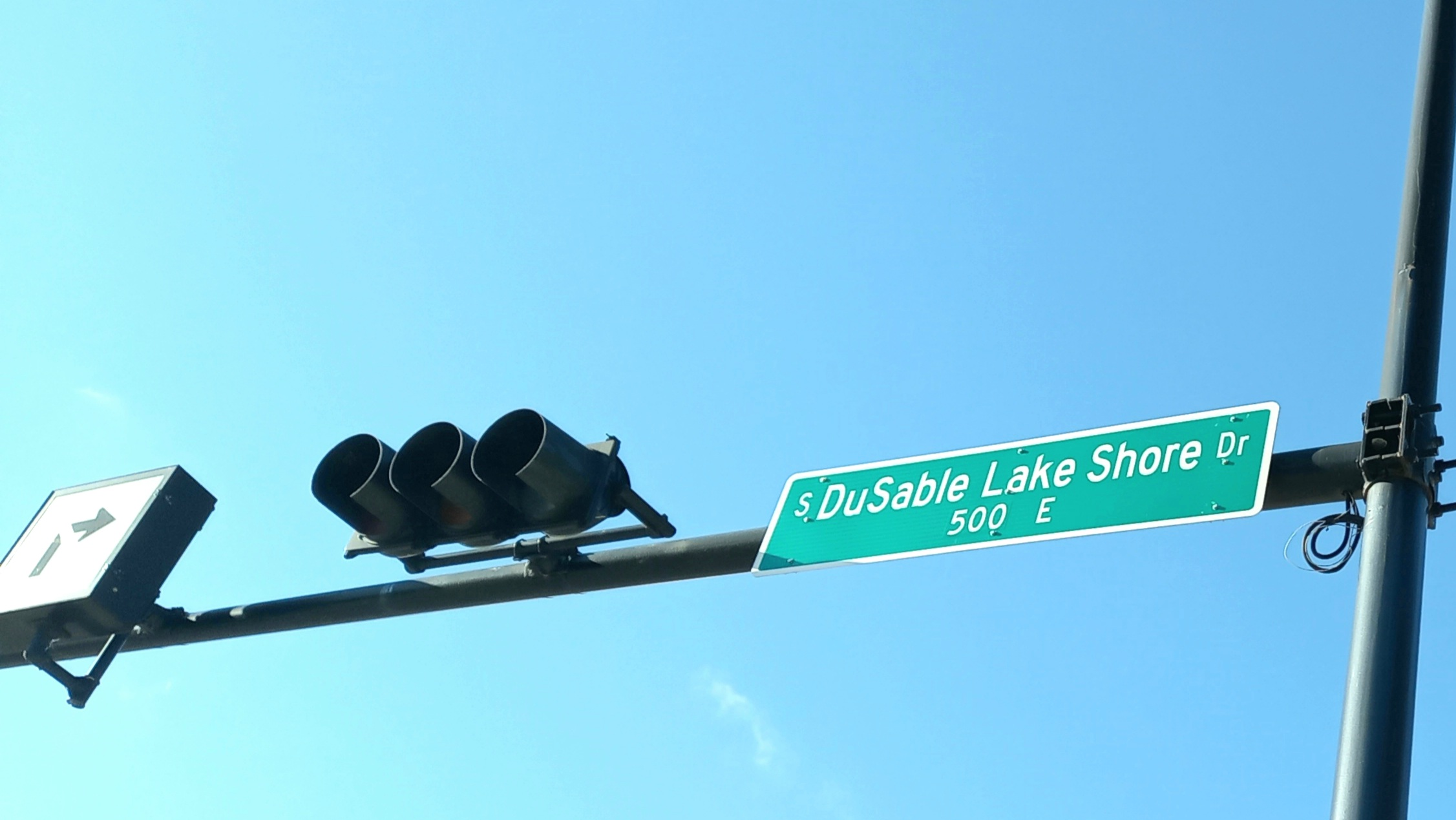
Installed signage in line with the 2021 name change: DuSable Lake Shore Drive

As early as 1993, a proposal to rename Lake Shore Drive in honor of du Sable was backed by former Aldermen Toni Preckwinkle (4th Ward) and Madeline Haithcock (2nd Ward). However, this plan was rejected by former Mayor Richard M. Daley, who cited its high cost. In October 2019, the 1993 proposal was reintroduced by 4th Ward Alderman David Moore and co-sponsored by ten others. Due to renewed national political attention to race relations following the May 2020 murder of George Floyd and subsequent civil unrest, which also impacted Chicago, the plan gained traction. In December 2020, a hearing on the proposal was held, but the vote was delayed to April 2021 due as Mayor Lori Lightfoot sought alternatives to honor du Sable. The plan was also amended to reduce the price tag, only renaming the Outer Drive from Hollywood Avenue to 67th Street. In late April 2021, this amended plan was reported favorably out of committee. A full Council vote was expected to take place in late May, but this was delayed further to late June due to Lightfoot's opposition. In late June, the proposal was passed by the City Council, 33–15. Polls indicated racial polarization around the name change, with a majority of white residents critical of the plan and a majority of non-white residents in support. This divide was reflected in the Council vote: the ordinance received predominantly non-white aldermanic support, while two-thirds of the aldermen in opposition were white.

== Future ==
Lake Shore Drive traffic in April 2022.

In 2004, a private foundation solicited plans, and the Chicago Park District considered a feasibility study, to extend Lake Shore Drive farther north through Rogers Park and into Evanston. They proved extremely controversial. Residents protested against cutting neighborhoods off from the lake, and Rogers Park and Edgewater voters rejected the extension in a referendum placed on the ballot by citizen initiative in November 2004. However, in spring 2005, the Chicago Park District spent $350,000 on plans for new marinas along Lake Shore Drive, including one at Devon-Granville, and in July 2005, Cong. Jan Schakowsky (IL-9) obtained federal funding reported variously as $800,000 and $1 million for a study of the possible extension of the Chicago North lakefront path; both of these developments fueled residents' suspicion of a secret city plan to extend the Drive. The controversy remained an issue through the 2007 aldermanic election in the 49th Ward. In 2008, proposals by Friends of the Parks to extend the lakefront park system north, possibly through offshore manmade islands linked by bike paths, met with similar resident opposition. Despite statements by FOP that no extension of the Drive was contemplated, activists contended that the Park District "has plans already drawn up that clearly show Lake Shore Drive immediately east of" Edgewater and Rogers Park.

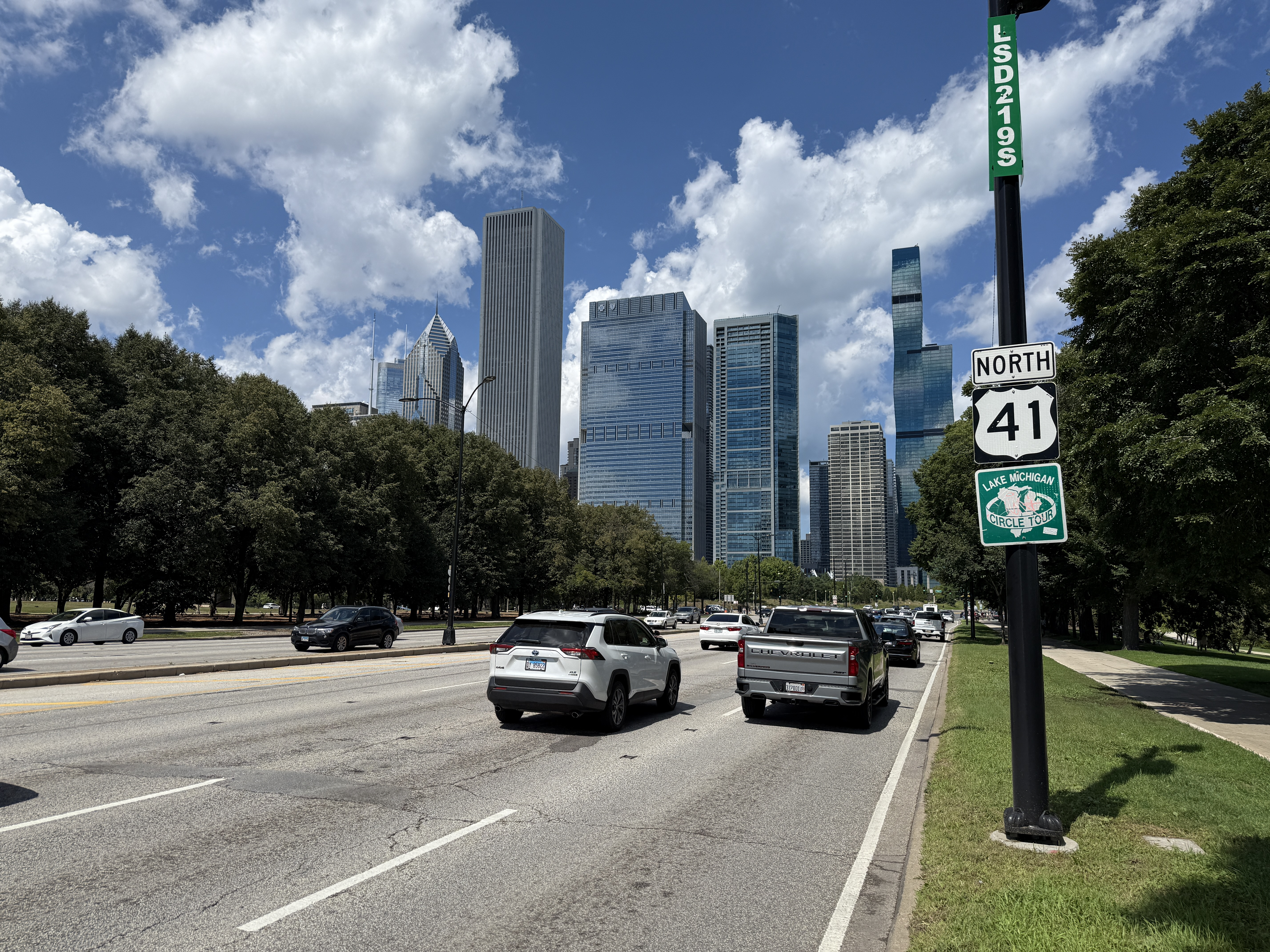
Lake Shore Drive (US 41) northbound past Jackson Drive in Chicago

Throughout the 2010s and the 2020s, IDOT, CDOT, and the Chicago Park District worked on a project (dubbed "Redefine the Drive") to reconstruct a portion of Lake Shore Drive north of downtown, citing traffic congestion, deteriorating infrastructure, and safety issues. The project also sought to expand the lakefront as well as adding amenities to the lakefront (including the Lakefront Trail) and straightening the S-curve. Organizations like Active Transportation Alliance emphasized the need to make the lakefront more welcoming to pedestrians and cyclists, suggesting that Lake Shore Drive be downsized. One proposal put forward in 2017 was to place the straightened S‑curve underground. In the fall of 2020, planners narrowed the lane configuration options down to 5: keep the existing lanes except for the addition of queue jump lane, add a bus lane (the "Addition"), turn the left lane into a bus lane (the "Exchange"), turn the left lane into toll lane (the "Flex"), and turn two left lanes into toll lanes (the "Double Flex").

Streeterville portion of Lake Shore Drive

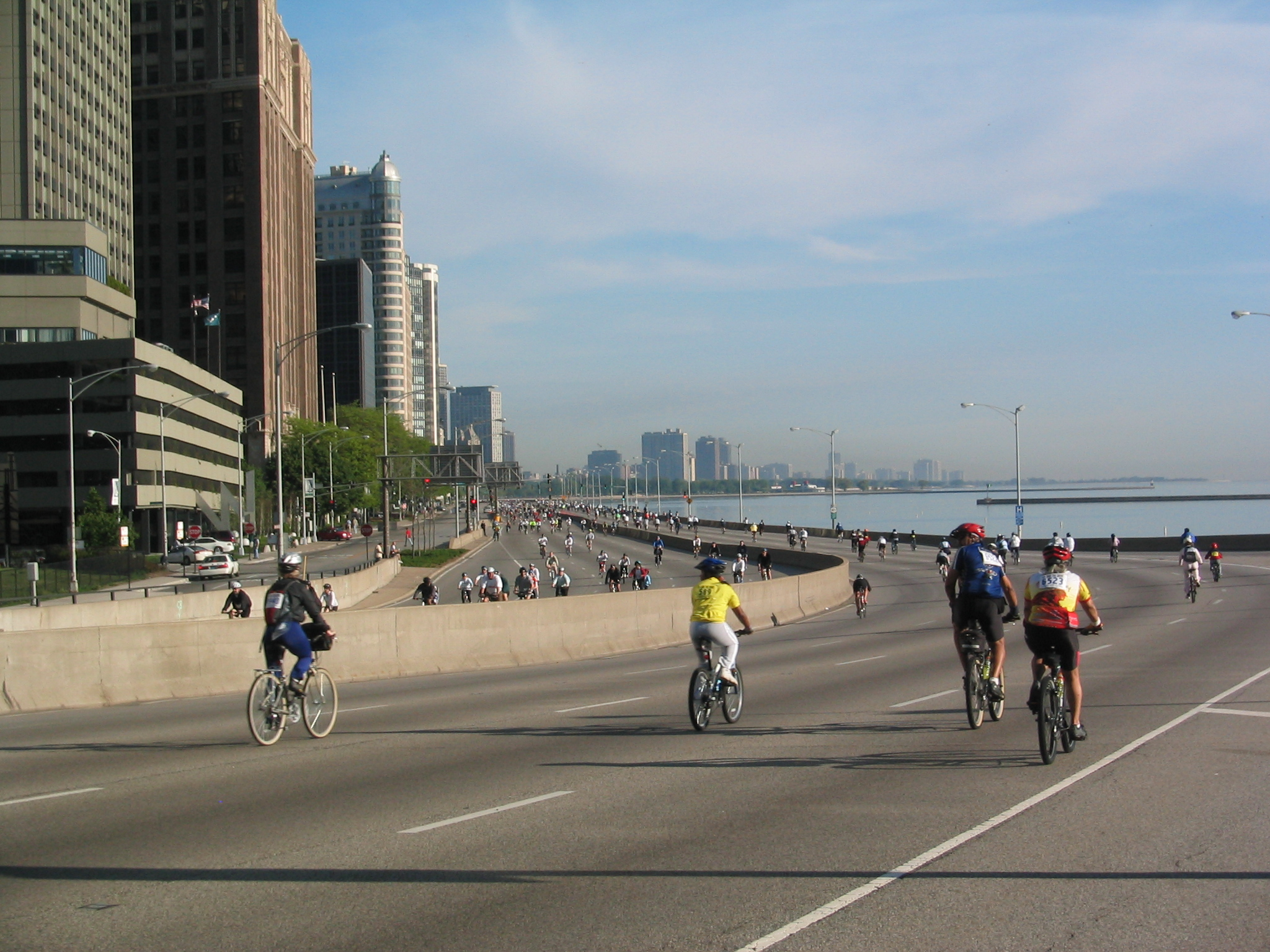
from south during Bike The Drive

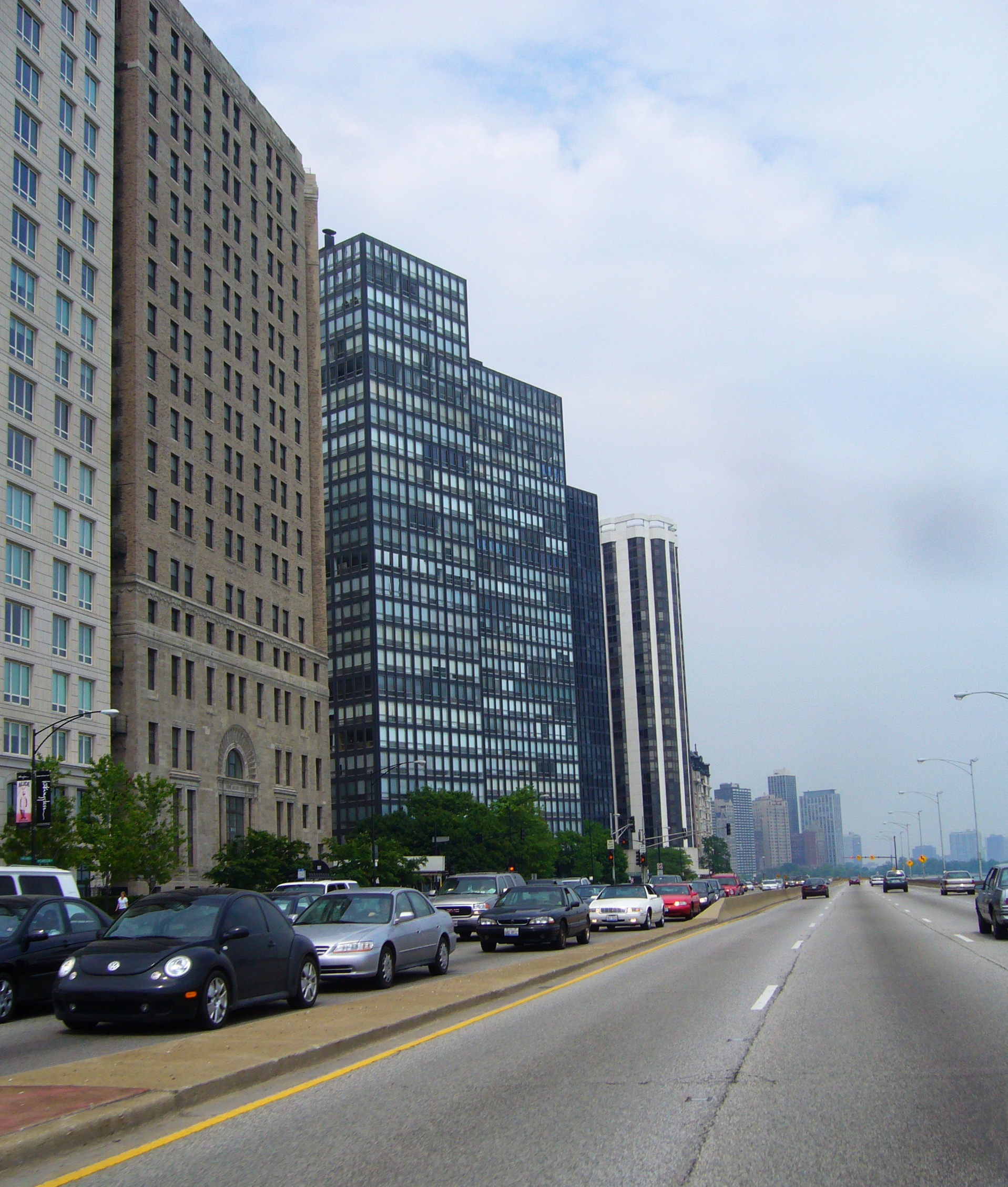
from south

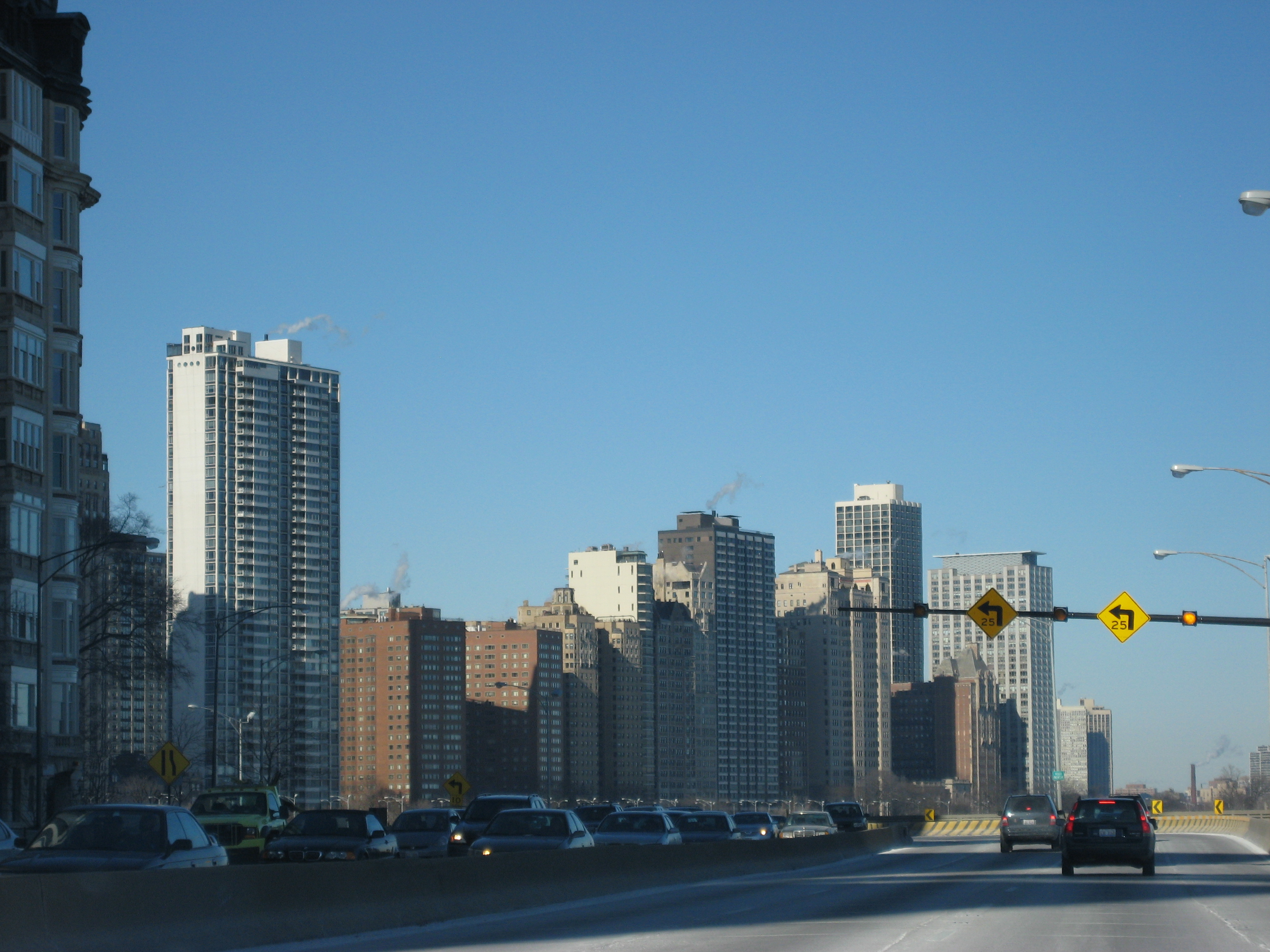
Gold Coast from Streeterville

== Major intersections ==
The Drive connects the following Chicago community areas from South to North: South Shore; Woodlawn; Hyde Park; Kenwood; Oakland; Douglas; Near South Side; The Loop; Near North Side; Lincoln Park; Lake View; Uptown; and Edgewater.

The entire route is in Chicago, Cook County. All exits are unnumbered.

mi	km	Destinations	Notes
2.1	3.4	US 41 south (Ewing Avenue) / Mackinaw Avenue, Harbor Avenue	Southern terminus
2.5	4.0	89th Street	
2.8	4.5	87th Street	
3.0	4.8	85th Street	
3.3	5.3	83rd Street	
3.8	6.1	Farragut Drive	Access to Rainbow Beach
4.0	6.4	South Brandon Avenue	Southbound exit and entrance only
4.0	6.4	US 41 north (South Shore Drive) / East 79th Street	Northern terminus
Gap in route
6.4	10.3	US 41 south (South Shore Drive) / Marquette Drive, Jeffery Drive	Southern terminus
6.7	10.8	Hayes Drive (6300 South)	
7.5	12.1	Science Drive (5700 South)	Access to the Museum of Science and Industry
7.6	12.2	57th Drive (5700 South)	
8.2	13.2	53rd Street	Southbound exit only
8.6	13.8	Hyde Park Boulevard (5100 South)	Southbound exit only
9.1	14.6	47th Street (4700 South)	Interchange
10.2	16.4	Oakwood Boulevard (3900 South)	Interchange
11.3	18.2	31st Street (3100 South)	Interchange
12.0	19.3	I-55 south (Stevenson Expressway) – St. Louis	Interchange; northern terminus of I-55
12.7	20.4	18th Drive – Museum Campus	Interchange
12.9	20.8	Waldron Drive (1500 South)	At-grade intersection; northbound exit and entrance only
13.1	21.1	Columbus Drive to I-290	At-grade intersection; northbound exit and southbound entrance only
13.2	21.2	McFetridge Drive (1400 South)	At-grade intersection; northbound exit and entrance only, Access to the Field Museum, Shedd Aquarium, and Adler Planetarium
13.4	21.6	Roosevelt Road (1200 South) to I-90 / I-94	
13.8	22.2	Balbo Drive (700 South)	
14.2	22.9	Jackson Drive (300 South); Historic US 66	Eastern terminus of Historic US 66
14.3	23.0	Monroe Drive (100 South)	
14.6	23.5	Randolph Street (150 North)	
14.6	23.5	Wacker Drive to I-290	Interchange; Northbound exit via Randolph Street; southbound exit via Grand Avenue
14.9– 15.0	24.0– 24.1	Outer Drive Bridge	
15.1	24.3	Illinois Street (500 North), Grand Avenue (530 North)	Interchange
15.4	24.8	Ontario Street	Southbound exit only
15.5	24.9	Chicago Avenue (800 North)	At-grade intersection; no southbound exit (Note: This intersection is closed to traffic entering and exiting the drive from either direction from 6:45am–9:30am Monday through Friday (traffic light on the drive remains solid green and cones block the turning lanes and exit point; Chestnut Street southbound exit is unaffected))
15.7	25.3	Chestnut Street (860 North)	Southbound exit only
16.1	25.9	Michigan Avenue/Oak Street	Southbound exit and northbound entrance
16.8	27.0	IL 64 (LaSalle Drive) to North Avenue	Interchange; eastern terminus of IL 64
17.8	28.6	Fullerton Parkway (2400 North)	Interchange
18.9	30.4	Belmont Avenue (3200 North)	Interchange
19.5	31.4	Recreation Drive	Northbound exit only
19.9	32.0	IL 19 (Irving Park Road)	Interchange; eastern terminus of IL 19
20.5	33.0	Montrose Avenue (4400 North)	Interchange
20.7	33.3	Wilson Avenue (4600 North)	Interchange
21.0	33.8	Lawrence Avenue (4800 North)	Interchange
21.5	34.6	US 41 north (Foster Avenue)	Northbound exit and southbound entrance North end of US-41 concurrency
		Bryn Mawr Avenue (5600 North)	Northbound exit and southbound entrance
		Hollywood Avenue/Sheridan Road	At-grade intersection; northern terminus
1.000 mi = 1.609 km; 1.000 km = 0.621 mi: Concurrency terminus; Incomplete access; Route transition

== Notable places ==
=== Locations ===
View from John Hancock Center

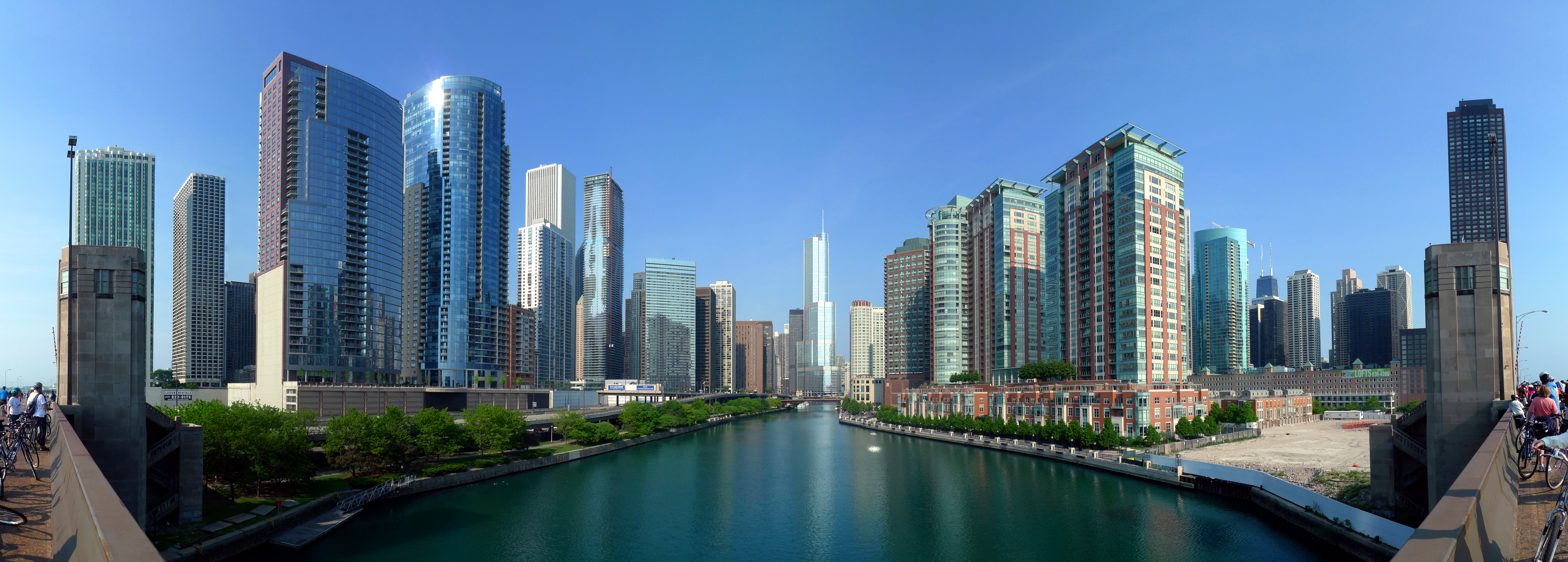
2009 view from Lake Shore Drive of Chicago River, the south border (right) of the Near North Side and Streeterville and north border (left) of Chicago Loop, Lakeshore East and Illinois Center (with Trump International Hotel and Tower at jog in the river in the center)

- 860-880 Lake Shore Drive Apartments
- The Aquitania
- Burnham Park
- Chicago Yacht Club
- Drake Hotel
- DuSable Park
- Edgewater Beach Apartments
- Grant Park
- Harbor Point Condominium
- International Museum of Surgical Science
- Jackson Park

- 63rd Street Beach

- Kwanusila Totem Pole
- Lake Point Tower
- Lincoln Park
- McCormick Place
- Montrose Beach
- Museum Campus Chicago

- Adler Planetarium
- Field Museum of Natural History
- Shedd Aquarium

- Museum of Science and Industry
- Navy Pier
- North Avenue Beach
- Northerly Island
- Oak Street Beach
- One Museum Park
- Playboy Enterprises
- Promontory Point
- Soldier Field
- Temple Sholom

=== Neighborhoods ===
- Bronzeville
- Edgewater
- Hyde Park
- Kenwood
- Lakeview
- Lincoln Park
- Gold Coast
- Streeterville
- South Shore
- South Loop
- Uptown
- Woodlawn

=== Parks ===
Much of Chicago's shoreline is given over to public parks. The Drive, running through or alongside these parks, gives travelers views and access to these parks and their many amenities. In addition, the Chicago Lakefront Trail (abbreviated as LFT) is an 18-mile multi-use path that often runs in the parks near the Drive. It is popular with cyclists and joggers. From north to south, the parks are Lincoln Park, Grant Park, Burnham Park and Jackson Park.

== Use in culture ==
=== As political moniker ===
In the 20th century, the tiny neighborhoods near Lake Shore Drive came to be occupied by exclusive high-rise apartments, condominiums and co-op buildings. To the political columnist Mike Royko, Lake Shore Drive was goo-goo territory, a land occupied by Chicago's wealthy "good-government" types. Royko sometimes used Lake Shore Drive as a political moniker. Though he often agreed with the reformers, he looked upon them with the same cynical eye as his fictional Chicago everyman, Slats Grobnik.

=== In motorsport ===
A part of the Chicago Street Course uses Lakeshore Drive as a part of the track.

=== In popular culture ===
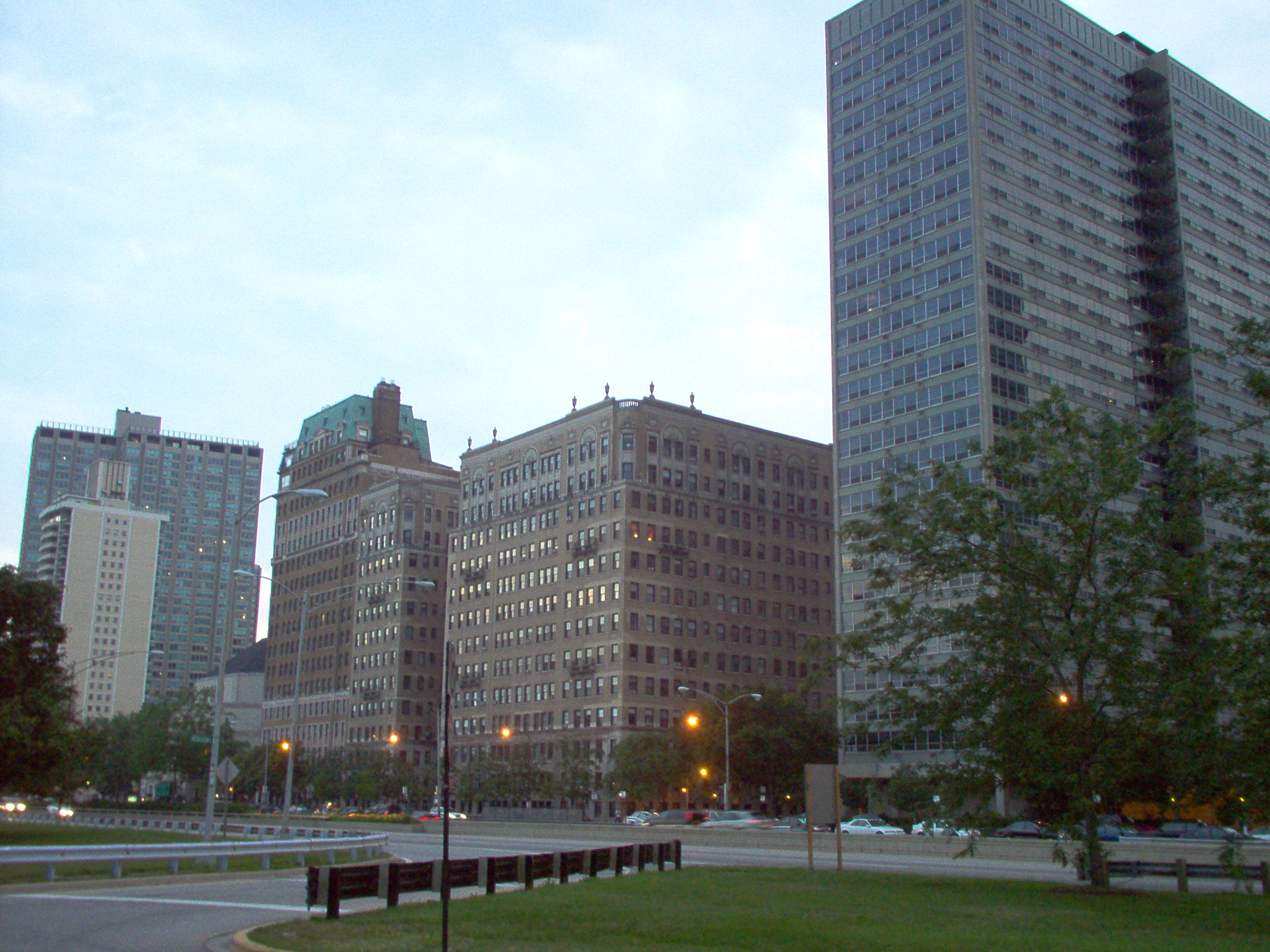
Both vintage and modern upscale condominiums along Lake Shore Drive in Lake View East stand side by side, overshadowing the historic Jewish Temple Sholom.

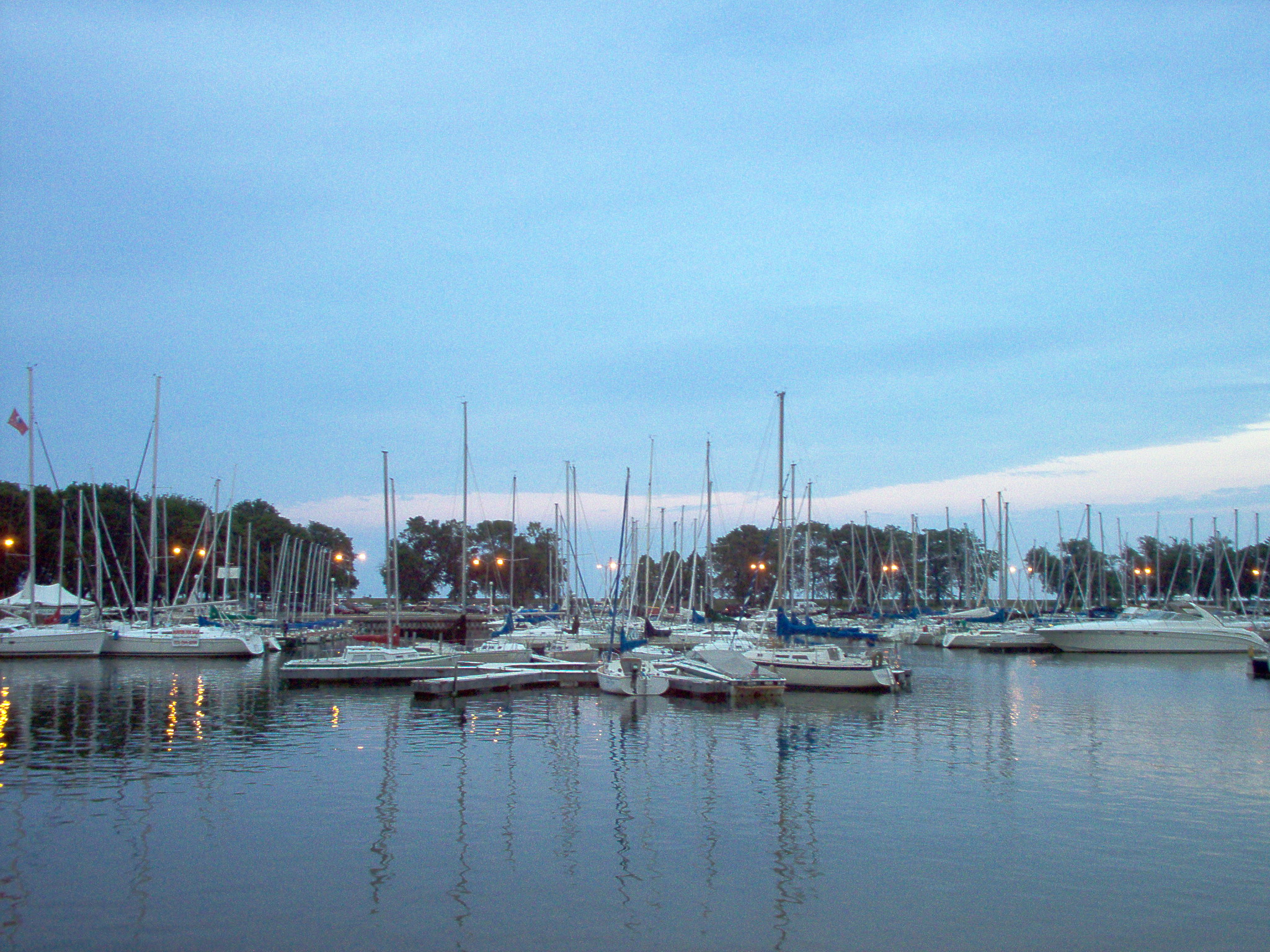
Lake Shore Drive is gateway to many marinas like Belmont Harbor, one of the largest in Chicago.

Many films based in Chicago feature scenes on Lake Shore Drive, including Cheaper by the Dozen, Ferris Bueller's Day Off, The Blues Brothers, The Break-Up, Risky Business, Love Jones, My Best Friend's Wedding, Somewhere in Time and National Lampoon's Vacation. In When Harry Met Sally..., the title characters are seen taking Lake Shore Drive in the opposite compass direction to that which their origin point and destination would require.

The last, long shot of the 2008 film Gran Torino, over which the end credits roll and the eponymous title song plays, shows the car driven along Lake Shore Drive and disappearing into the distance.

In television, Lake Shore Drive is seen in AT&T's/"The New Cingular's" "Weight" ad with the ad's protagonist driving south along Lake Shore Drive towards the John Hancock Building. The opening credits of the late 1980s and early 1990s sitcom Married... with Children features a flyover of Lake Shore Drive. Also, the medical drama ER has shot scenes at or near Lake Shore Drive over the show's 15 season run.

The 1971 song "Lake Shore Drive" by Aliotta Haynes Jeremiah is a reference to the road. Styx mentions the road in their 1979 song "Borrowed Time" as well as "Back to Chicago" from 1990. The road is also mentioned in the 2005 Kanye West songs "Drive Slow" and "Grammy Family", as well as in his verse in the Boost Mobile promotional single "Whole City Behind Us." The song "Lake Shore Drive" by Art Porter Jr. is also about the famous road. It is also mentioned in Fall Out Boy's song, "Lake Effect Kid": "joke us, joke us 'till Lake Shore Drive comes back into focus."

Lake Shore Drive is also featured in the 1999 Microsoft game Midtown Madness.

In the Electronic Arts NASCAR video game series, 2005: Chase for the Cup, 06: Total Team Control, 07, 08, and 09 all include a fictional street course that uses part of the real-life Lake Shore Drive, along with a few side streets. In Chase for the Cup, it is referred to as Lakeshore Drive, and must be unlocked by using a cheat code. In the latter four games, it goes by Wal-Mart Raceway, and is available from the start.

== See also ==
- 860–880 Lake Shore Drive Apartments
- 900-910 North Lake Shore
- Bike the Drive
- Boulevard Lakefront Tour
