= Silver (band) =

American 1970s country-rock band

- Origin: Los Angeles, California, United States
- Genres: Rock, country rock, pop rock, soft rock
- Years active: 1971–1978
- Label: Arista
- Past members: John Batdorf; Tom Leadon; Brent Mydland; Greg Collier; Harry Stinson; JP “DJP” Williams

Silver was an American 1970s country rock band, best known for their 1976 pop hit "Wham Bam Shang-A-Lang," written by country songwriter Rick Giles. The song peaked in charts in USA, Canada and Australia.

== Members ==
Members of the group included John Batdorf (formerly of Batdorf & Rodney), lead vocals and guitar; Brent Mydland (later of the Grateful Dead), keyboards and vocals; Tom Leadon (brother of the Eagles' Bernie Leadon and a former member of Tom Petty's early group Mudcrutch), bass guitar and vocals; Greg Collier, guitar and vocals; and Harry Stinson, drums and percussion. Phil Hartman designed the cover art for Silver, the quintet's only album. The band's recordings were released on the Arista record label.

== Career ==
The single's title, "Wham Bam," was shown as "Wham Bam Shang-A-Lang" and peaked at #16 on the Billboard Hot 100 the week of October 2, 1976. It is ranked as the 70th biggest hit of 1976. Arista executives gave the band the song to record after concluding that none of the other tracks on the album they produced had single potential. Arista head Clive Davis himself co-produced the single with Tom Sellers; the rest of the album was produced by Sellers and Silver.

Chicago radio superstation WLS, which gave "Wham Bam" much airplay, ranked the song as the 80th biggest hit of 1976. It peaked at number eight on their surveys of October 23 and 30, 1976.

Arista released two further singles by the band, "Musician (It's Not an Easy Life)" and "Memory" which featured the non-album track "So Much for the Past", written by Brent Mydland, on the B-side.

== Aftermath ==
Silver broke up in 1978. Mydland joined the Grateful Dead in 1979, and was the band's longest-tenured keyboardist, remaining with the group until his death in 1990 at the age of 37. Mydland was inducted into the Rock and Roll Hall of Fame as a member of the Dead in 1994. Leadon rejoined Mudcrutch when that band reunited in 2007. Stinson became a country session musician, and was a member of Steve Earle's backing band The Dukes in the mid 1980s.

The band can be heard in the 2017 Marvel Studios sequel film, Guardians of the Galaxy Vol. 2, as "Wham Bam Shang-A-Lang" is included on the movie's soundtrack.

== Discography ==
=== Studio albums ===
Title	Details	Peak chart positions
Title	Details	US
Silver	Released: May 7, 1976; Label: Arista; Format: LP, cassette	142

=== Singles ===
Title	Year	Peak chart positions				Album
Title	Year	US	US AC	AUS	CAN	Album
"Wham Bam Shang-a-Lang"/"Right On Time"	1976	16	22	62	27	Silver
"Musician (It's Not an Easy Life)"/"Goodbye So Long"	1976	—	—	—	—	Silver
"Memory"/"So Much For The Past" (Non-album b side)	1976	—	—	—	—	Silver

== See also ==
- List of 1970s one-hit wonders in the United States
