= Aliotta Haynes Jeremiah =

American rock group (1970–1977)

- Aliotta Haynes Jeremiah on the cover of their 1971 self-titled EP

Background information
- Origin: Chicago, U.S
- Genre: Rock
- Years active: 1970–1977
- Past members: Mitch Aliotta; John Jeremiah; Skip Haynes; Ted Aliotta

Aliotta Haynes Jeremiah was an American rock group active from 1970 to 1977.

The preceding incarnation was named Aliotta Haynes, a trio composed of bassist Mitch Aliotta, drummer Ted Aliotta, and guitarist Skip Haynes. Ted departed after their debut album, Aliotta Haynes Music (1970), and was replaced by keyboardist John Jeremiah. As Aliotta Haynes Jeremiah, their 1971 eponymous album was their last for the Ampex label.

The band scored a popular regional hit in the Chicago area in 1972 with the title track of their follow-up 1973 album, Lake Shore Drive, a tribute to the lakefront highway in Chicago.

The 1992 Quicksilver CD compilation Lake Shore Drive was missing two songs from the original 1973 Big Foot LP, "Leaving Chicago A.M.F." and "Long Time Gone" (medley with "When I Was a Cowboy"), but contained the title track of 1977's Slippin' Away plus newer material. Lake Shore Drive was re-released on compact disc in 1996 for its 25th anniversary on a double-CD set, along with some of the band's other songs.

The band appeared in a 1978 made-for-TV movie, Sparrow, playing a rock band whose lead singer is electrocuted while performing onstage.

"Lake Shore Drive" was featured in the soundtrack of the 2017 movie Guardians of the Galaxy Vol. 2.

== Deaths ==
- Keyboardist John Jeremiah died in Chester, Illinois on December 5, 2011.
- Mitchell A. Aliotta, also of the Rotary Connection, died on July 21, 2015, at the age of 71.
- Skip Haynes died on October 2, 2017.
- Ted Aliotta, the last living member of the group, died in Berwyn, Illinois on March 21, 2025, at the age of 78.

== Discography ==
- Aliotta Haynes Music (LP) (Ampex 10108) 1970
- Aliotta Haynes Jeremiah (LP) (Ampex 10119) 1971
- Lake Shore Drive (LP) (Big Foot 714) 1973
- Slippin' Away (LP) (Little Foot 711) 1977
- Lake Shore Drive (CD) (Quicksilver QSCD-1019) 1992
- Songs (CD) (Quicksilver QSCD-1025) 1994
- Lake Shore Drive at 25 (2-CDs) (Quicksilver QSCD-1033) 1996
- United Airlines: Chicago, Our Kind Of Town (CD) (EMI-Capitol) 1998
- Bob Stroud's Classic Rock Roots Vol. II (SRO Productions) 1999
