= Wham Bam =

"Wham Bam Shang-a-Lang"
- Artwork for Spanish vinyl release

Single by Silver

from the album Silver
- B-side: "Right on Time"
- Released: August 13, 1976
- Recorded: 1976
- Genre: Pop rock
- Length: 3:25
- Label: Arista
- Songwriter: Rick Giles
- Producers: Tom Sellers, Clive Davis

Silver singles chronology
"Wham Bam Shang-a-Lang" (1976)	"Memory" (1976)

"Wham Bam" (also called "Wham Bam Shang-A-Lang") is a 1976 song by the American band Silver, written by country songwriter Rick Giles. It was the only charting song by the group. John Batdorf sings lead vocals.

== Background ==
Arista executives gave the band the song to record, after concluding that none of the other tracks on the album they produced had single potential. Arista head Clive Davis co-produced the recording.

== Charts ==
The single's title, "Wham Bam", was shown as "Wham Bam Shang-A-Lang", and peaked at No. 16 on the US Billboard Hot 100 the week of October 2, 1976. It is ranked as the 71st biggest hit of 1976. The song also charted in Canada (No. 27), performing better on the Adult Contemporary chart (No. 17).

=== Weekly charts ===
Chart (1976)	Peak position
Australia (Kent Music Report)	62
Canadian RPM Top Singles	27
Canadian RPM Adult Contemporary	17
US Billboard Hot 100	16
US Billboard Adult Contemporary	22
US Cash Box Top 100	16

=== Year-end charts ===
Chart (1976)	Rank
Canada RPM Top Singles	189
US Billboard Hot 100	71

== Certifications ==
Region	Certification	Certified units/sales
New Zealand (RMNZ)	Gold	15,000^{‡}
^{‡} Sales+streaming figures based on certification alone.

== In popular culture ==
The song appears in the 2017 Marvel Studios sequel film, Guardians of the Galaxy Vol. 2, and is included on the movie's soundtrack.

== See also ==
- List of 1970s one-hit wonders in the United States
