= List of beaches in Chicago =

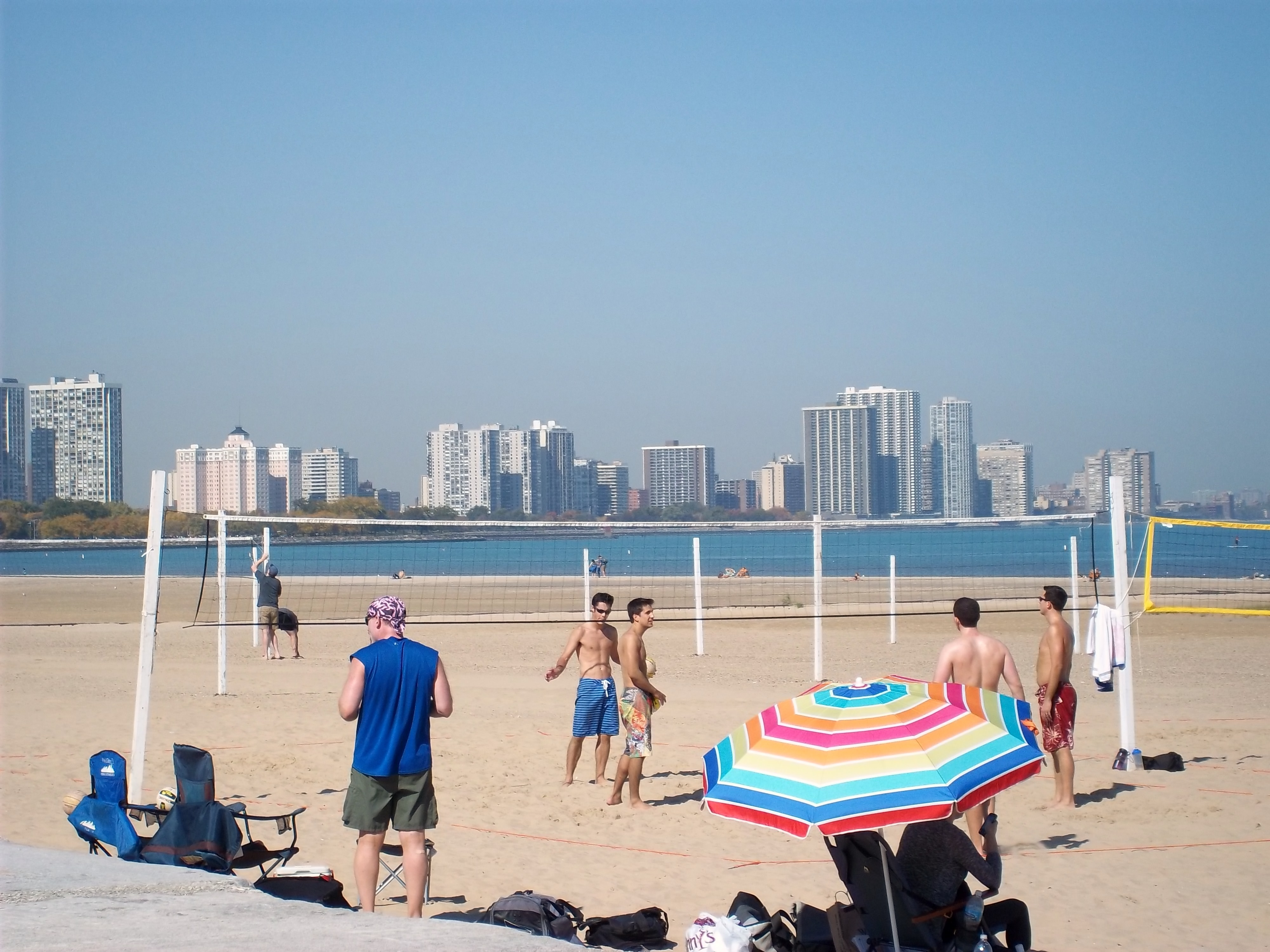
Montrose Avenue Beach (4400 N.) in Uptown

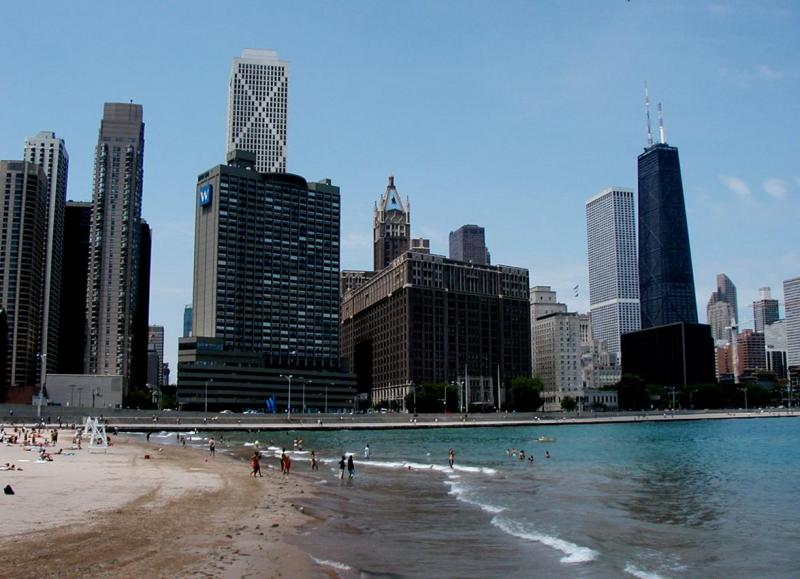
Ohio Street Beach (400 N.) in Near North

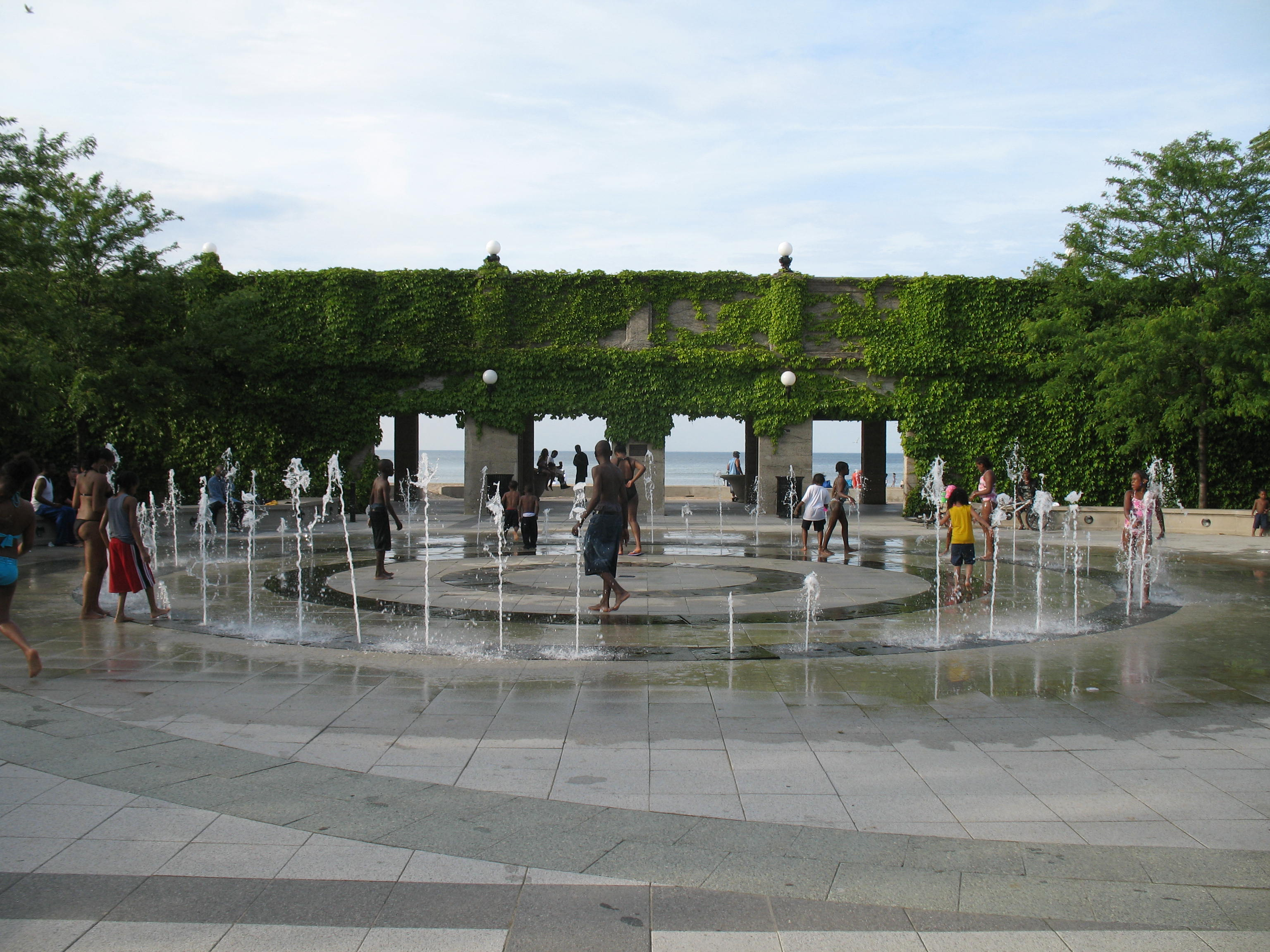
63rd Street beach house fountain (6300 S.) with beach and lake beyond in Jackson Park

The beaches in Chicago are an extensive network of waterfront recreational areas operated by the Chicago Park District. The Chicago metropolitan waterfront includes parts of the Lake Michigan shores as well as parts of the banks of the Chicago, Des Plaines, Calumet, Fox, and DuPage Rivers and their tributaries. The waterfront also includes the Illinois and Michigan Canal and the Sanitary and Ship Canal. Historically, the waterfront has been used for commerce, industry, and leisure. Leisure, such as fishing, swimming, hunting, walking and boating, was much more prevalent throughout the river sections of the waterfront system early in the 19th century before industrial uses altered the landscape. By midcentury, much leisure shifted to Lake Michigan. The first City of Chicago Public Beach opened in Lincoln Park in 1895. Today, the entire 28 miles (45 km) Chicago lakefront shoreline is reclaimed land, and primarily used for public parks. In the parks, there are 24 sand beaches along the shores of freshwater Lake Michigan.

== History ==
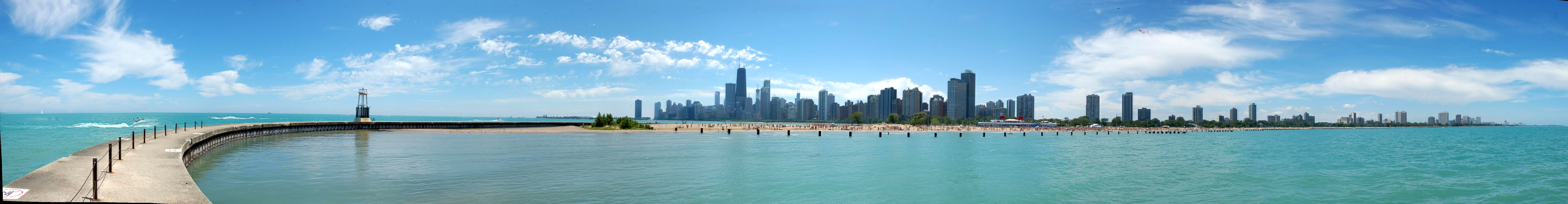

Chicago's earliest sand beaches resulted naturally from capturing sand moved by the current south along the shoreline toward the Indiana Dunes, but these beaches were dynamic, shifted and eroded. When Chicago began building piers and other structures into the lake, large sandy beaches formed generally to the north of a pier due to sand capture. Early beaches were generally funded by private entities such as hotels and private clubs, screened from the public.

Late 19th century city ordinances prohibited public bathing, but popular norms created demand for public beaches. Proponents saw public beaches as an opportunity to accommodate demand for public baths and eliminate the expenditure of enforcement resources on ordinance violations for public bathing. The city responded by opening the first public bathing beach in 1895 in Lincoln Park primarily as a response to the efforts of the Free Bath and Sanitary League. Spaces were designated for public use and the city accepted responsibility for maintaining the beaches. By 1900 the lakefront was divided into zones of recreational, residential, agricultural and industrial uses. Lake Michigan water quality concerns lead to the reversal of the Chicago River with deep cut of the Illinois & Michigan canal in 1871 and the construction of the Sanitary and Ship Canal at the start of the 20th century. The 1909 Burnham Plan led to development of the lakefront. Recreational development on the city lakefront became a priority due to the influence of Aaron Montgomery Ward. His belief that the public's access to the Lake left its impression on the development of Jackson, Burnham, Grant and Lincoln Parks. Continued popular support, led to the opening of several municipal beaches in the second decade of the 20th century. Modern beaches are formed from sand deposited by lake current, and occasionally inland sand excavated from nearby sand-pits left by the last ice age, or sand dredged from the lake bottom.

Free Wi-Fi service at city beaches began in 2013.

== Rogers Park ==
The far north Rogers Park neighborhood contains a series of small "street-end" beaches. Unlike most Chicago beaches, these are often separated by private property and therefore, unconnected to each other by public parkland.

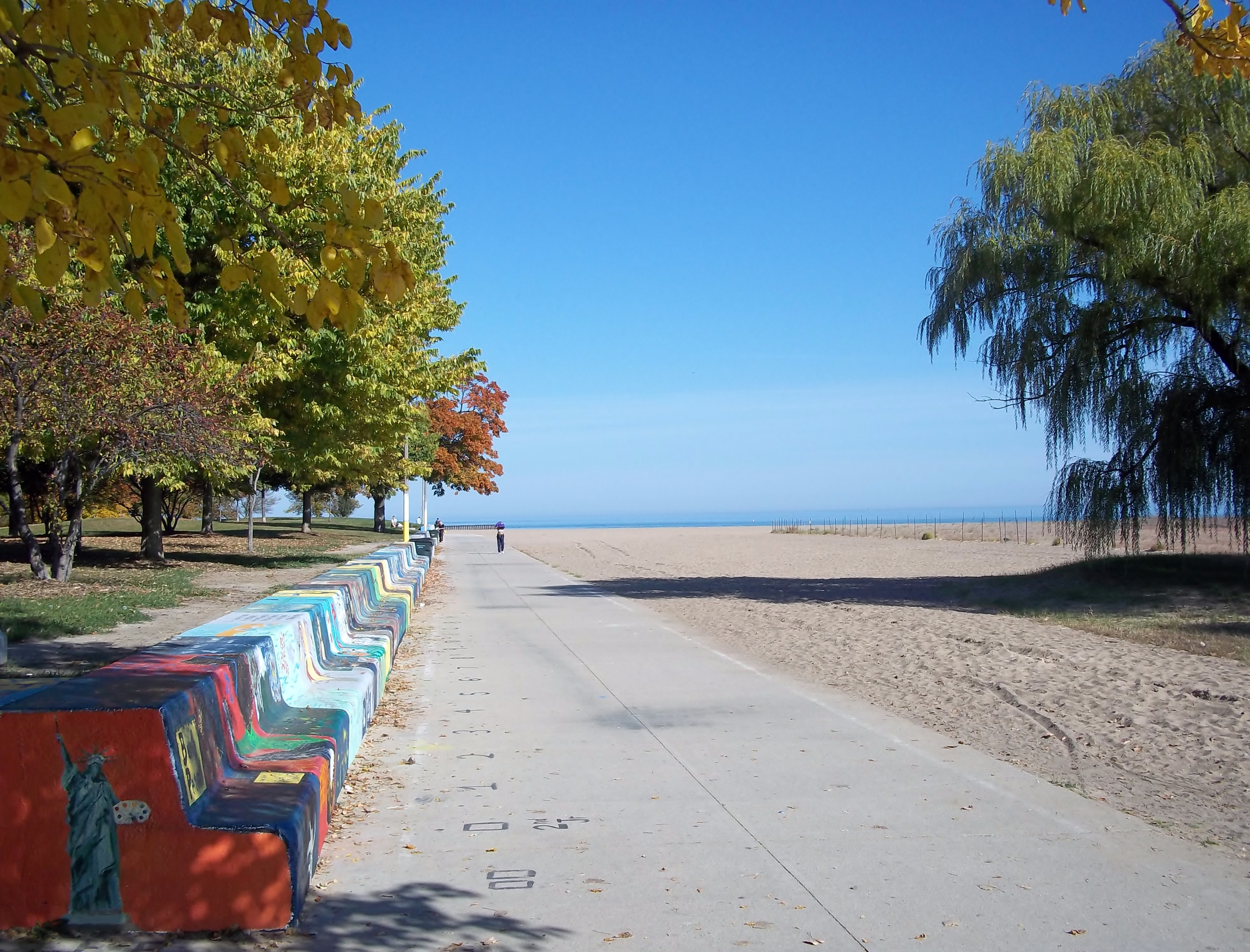
Loyola Park

=== Juneway Terrace Beach ===
Juneway Terrace Beach is the northernmost beach in Chicago. It is located at 7800 North and Lake Michigan. It lies within Rogers Avenue Beach and Park. It is separated from Rogers Beach by a stretch of rip rap protecting three apartment buildings.

=== Rogers Beach ===
Rogers Beach lies in Rogers Avenue Beach and Park at 7705 North. Barely one block long, the park also has tennis courts. After a January 2020 storm further eroded the shoreline, the Chicago Department of Transportation announced that riprap would replace the beach to stabilize the shoreline.

=== Howard Beach ===
Howard Beach lies in Howard Street Beach and Park at 7600 North, which is just south of Howard Street. It is perhaps 213 feet (65 m) long. Also to be deprecated as a result of the 2019-2020 lake erosion.

=== Marion Mahony Griffin Beach (Jarvis)/(Fargo) ===
Jarvis street is located at 7400 North and Fargo is located at 7432 North. Offshore stretches of riprap act to reduce erosion of this beach, which is about three blocks long.

In 2015, the beach was named in honor of architect Marion Mahony Griffin. The Australian Consul General, Roger Price, attended the beach's dedication for the woman who was instrumental in the design the Australian capital of Canberra. When she returned to the United States in 1939, after her husband's death, she lived near the beach.

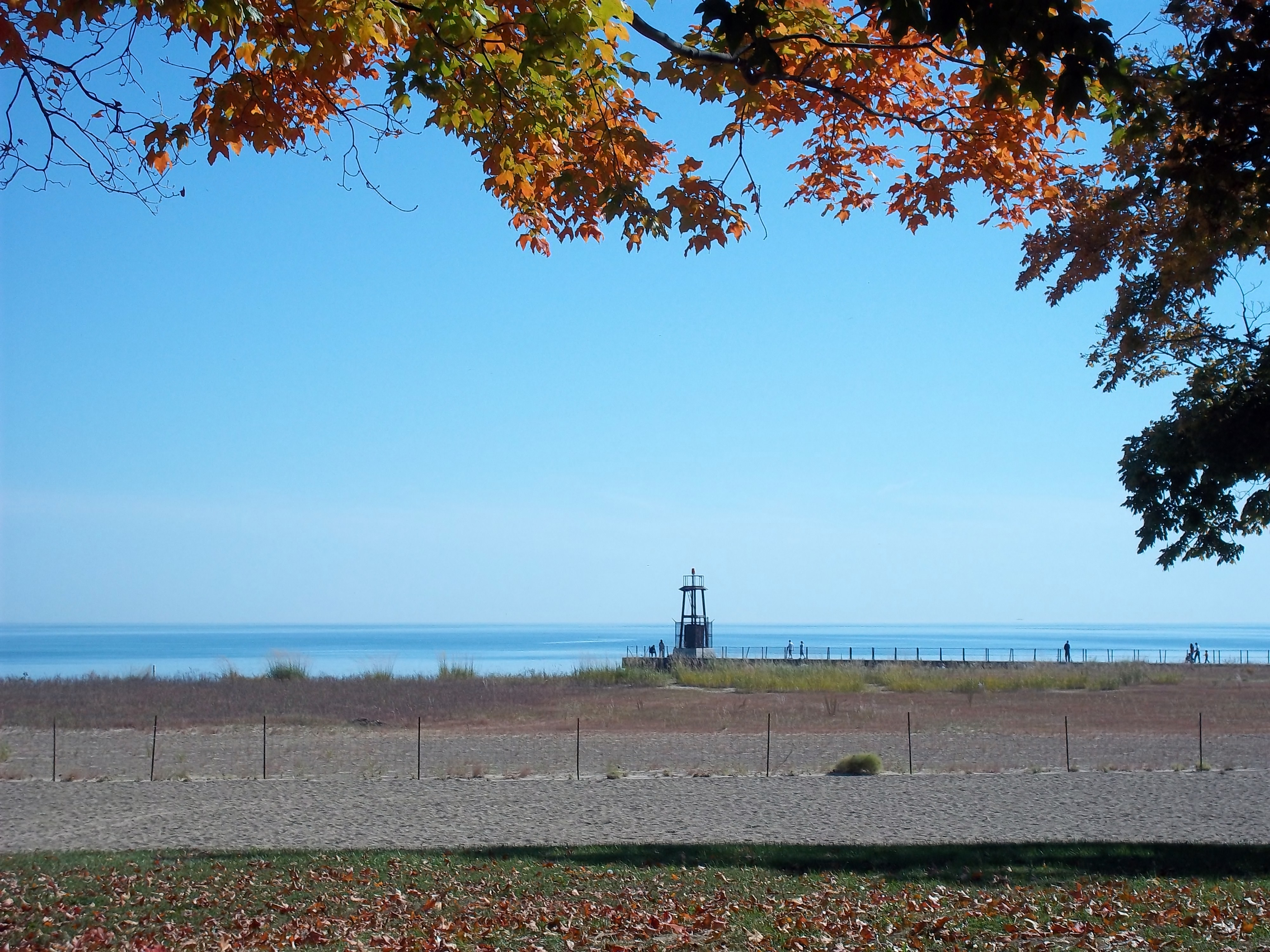
Loyola Park breakwater and nature area

=== Loyola/Leone Beach ===
42.009605°N 87.658496°W

North Sheridan Road and extending for eight blocks, Leone Beach is Chicago's largest.

The beach was named for Sam Leone, a longtime Chicago Park District employee, in 1966.

=== Tobey Prinz (Pratt) Beach ===
Contiguous with Leone/Loyola Beach located at 1050 West Pratt Boulevard.

Formerly named Pratt Boulevard Beach, it was renamed for local neighborhood activist Tobey Prinz by the Chicago Park District in 2014. There is a fishing pier and during the fall it is possible to catch salmon.

=== Hartigan (David) Beach ===
Formerly named Albion Beach, it is contiguous with North Shore Beach and is located at 1050 West Albion Avenue.

It was renamed in honor of David L. Hartigan, the former city treasurer and 49th Ward alderman, by request of the city council in 1960.

=== Columbia Beach ===
Columbia Beach is located at 6726 North.

=== North Shore Beach ===
North Shore Beach is located at 6700 North.

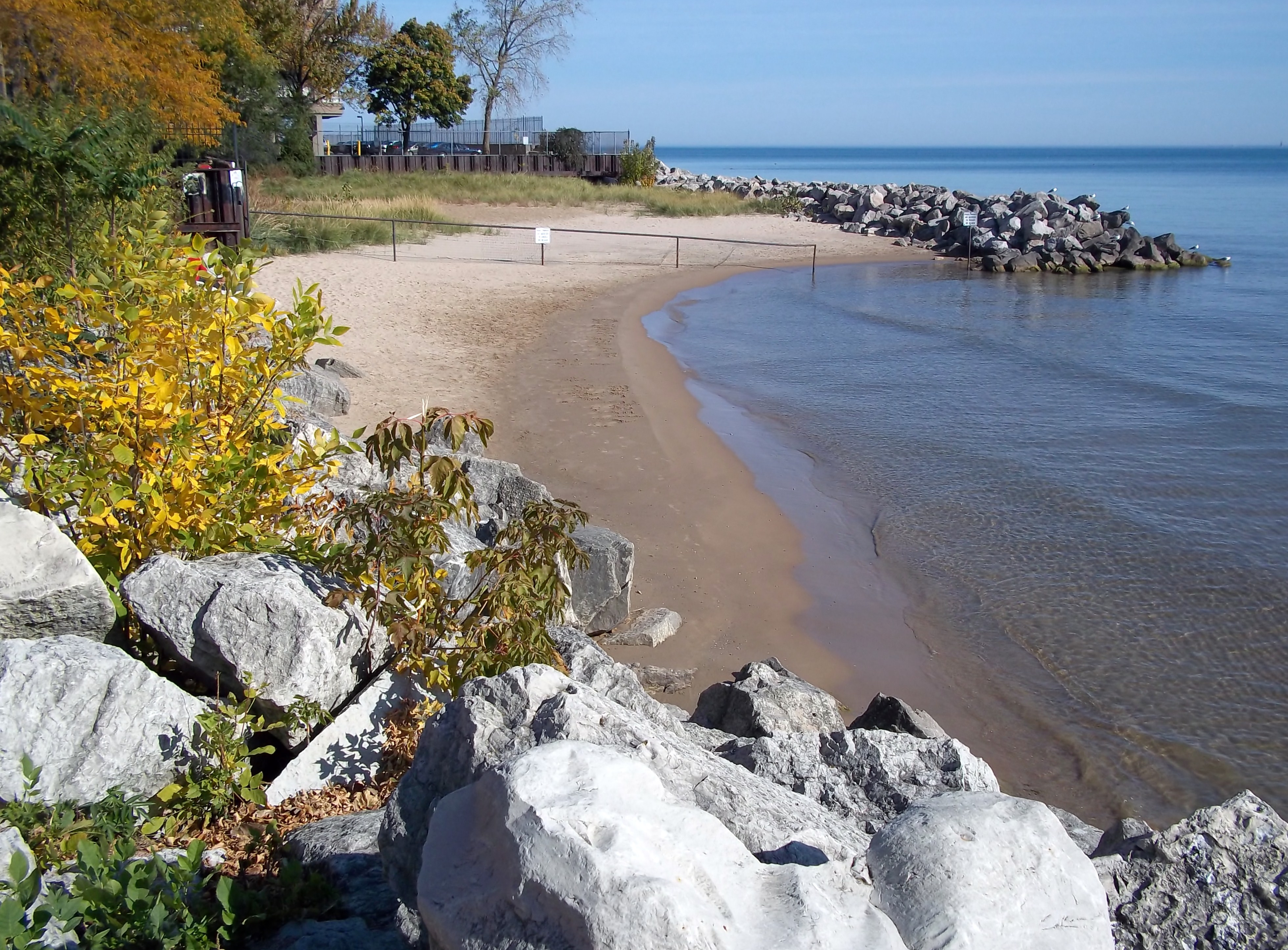
Berger Park beach

== Berger Park ==
41.995545°N 87.654639°W

Berger Park Beach is a small beach at the northeast corner of Berger Park in Edgewater. The park also contains a cultural center and lakeside café housed in two large century old lake homes and their carriage houses, as well as a playground.

== Lincoln Park ==
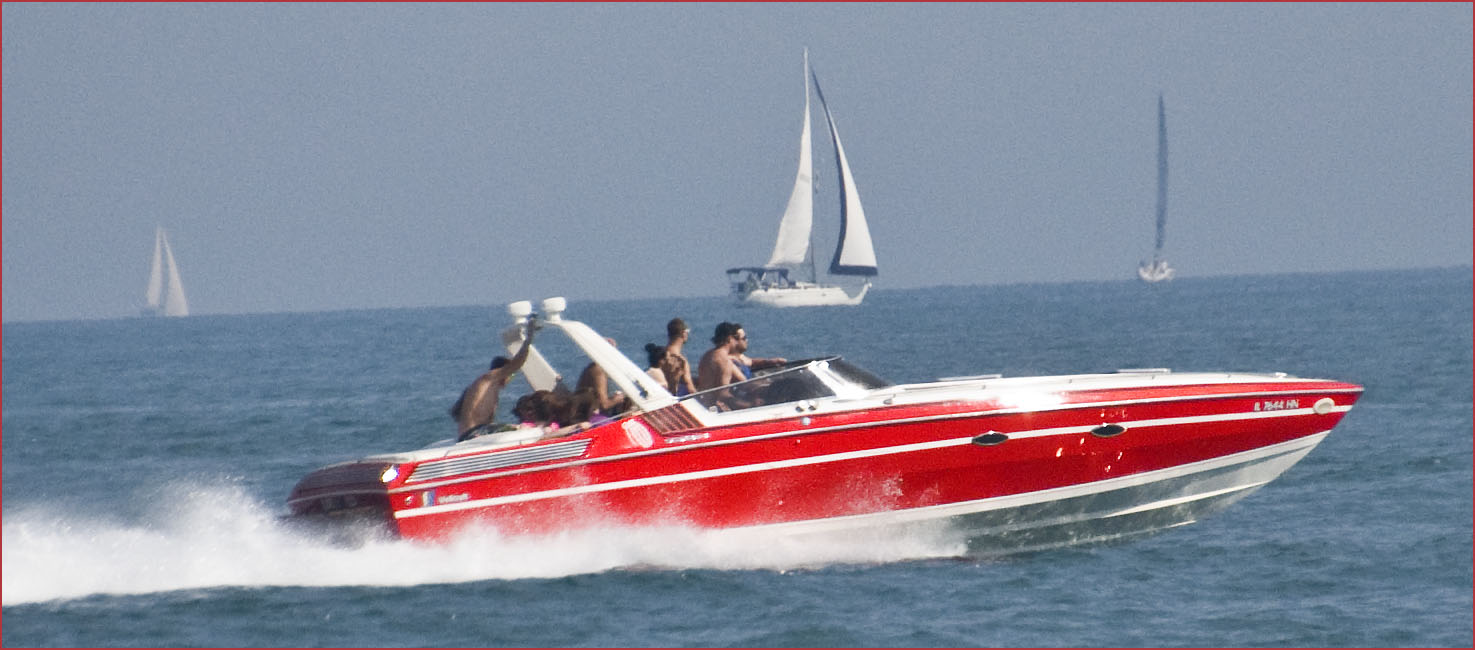

Lincoln Park is Chicago's largest public park and contains the city's remaining north side lake front beaches, running for seven miles (11 km) through the communities of Edgewater, Uptown, Lake View, Lincoln Park, and Near North.

=== Lane Beach Park (formerly Thorndale Beach) ===
Lane Beach Park, more commonly known as Thorndale Beach, is located at 5932 North in Edgewater at the intersection of Sheridan Road and Thorndale Avenue. This was once a standalone beach, as recently as the 1970s, but shifting sand and water levels later connected it to Hollywood Beach to the south. More recently, hard frozen waves that formed during the winter of 2015 carried much of the sand away, isolating the beach again.

There is a boardwalk ramp, to allow stroller or wheelchair access closer to the shoreline as well as a modern playground for children.

The park and beach was named for George A. Lane (1903–1974), a Chicago lawyer heavily involved in community development and politics. Lane also served as a faculty member at nearby Loyola University.

=== Kathy Osterman Beach (formerly Hollywood Beach) ===
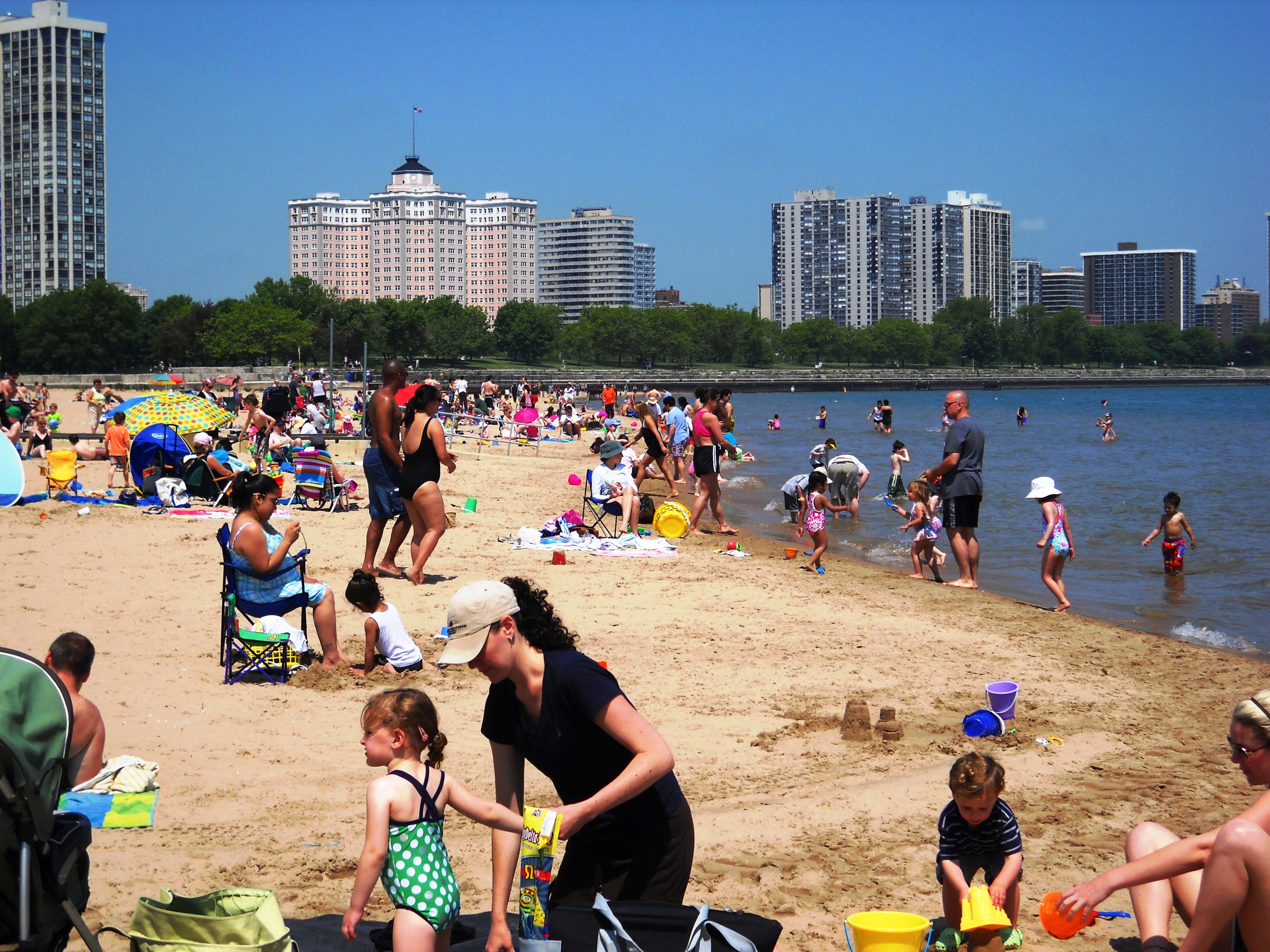
Foster Beach

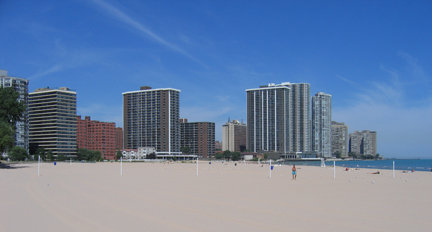
Hollywood Beach looking North to Thorndale

Kathy Osterman Beach is located at the 5800 North block where Lake Shore Drive ends at a curve that feeds into Sheridan Road (near Hollywood Avenue and North Lake Shore Drive; 41°59′11.51″N 87°39′9.38″W ) in Edgewater, forming a crescent shape. The northern half is largely a family beach and the southern half is largely a gay and lesbian beach. The northern half of the beach has shallow water which makes it kid-friendly and there is a long boardwalk ramp to allow closer access to the shoreline for strollers and wheelchairs near the Ardmore Avenue entrance. Beginning in the 1990s, gay men began to frequent the beach, particularly after the Belmont Rocks were demolished and paved over in 2003. Beach volleyball is popular here. There is a beach house and concession stand, which opened in 2010. Notably among Lincoln Park's northern beaches, there is no nearby parking lot.

In the upper beach, north of Ardmore and the boardwalk, near Thorndale beach, is a small park district beach grass reserve for migrating birds and butterflies.

=== Foster Avenue Beach ===
Foster Avenue Beach is located at 5200 North (41.978826°N 87.649355°W). It is a popular beach in the Edgewater section of the city. It was part of Lincoln Park's final landfill extension completed in the 1950s between Foster Avenue and Ardmore Avenue. The design and planning for the extension started in 1947, with construction and fill beginning three years later. The work on the beach continued over the rest of the fifties, being concluded in 1958. The original beach house for the site, like the existing ones at Montrose and North Avenues, was designed by E.V. Buchsbaum. It was constructed sometime in the late 1950s and early 1960s. A new beach house with improved amenities was constructed in the 1990s.

=== Montrose Avenue Beach ===
Montrose Avenue Beach

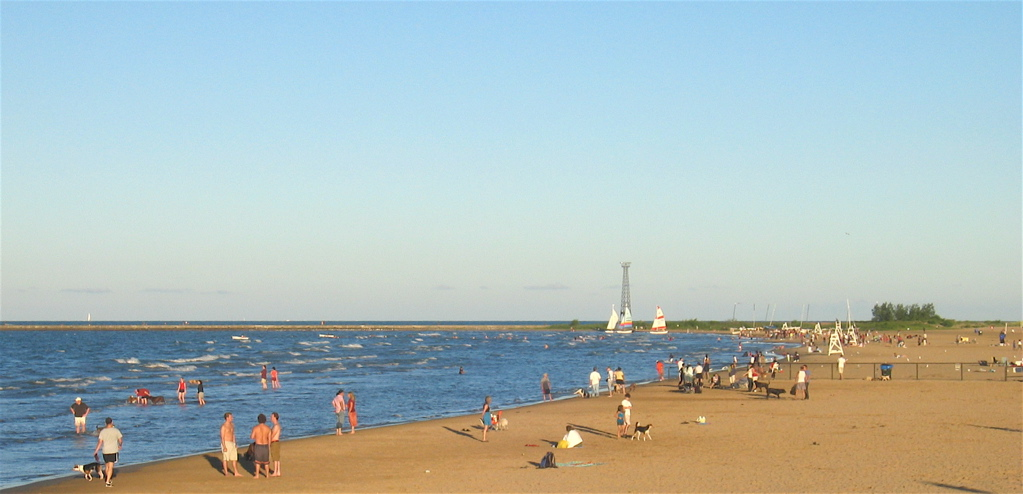
Beach looking south

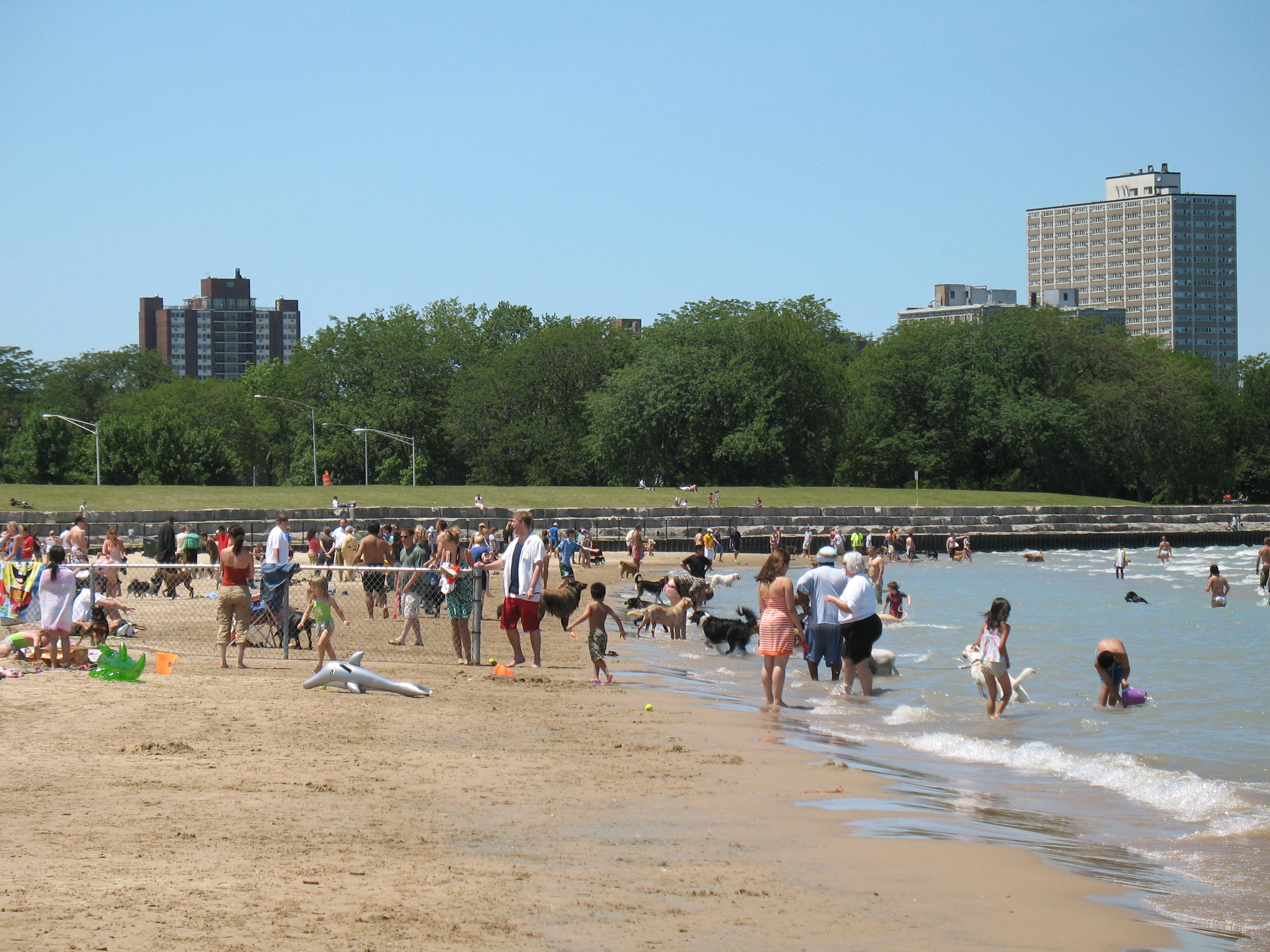
The dog beach at Montrose Avenue Beach

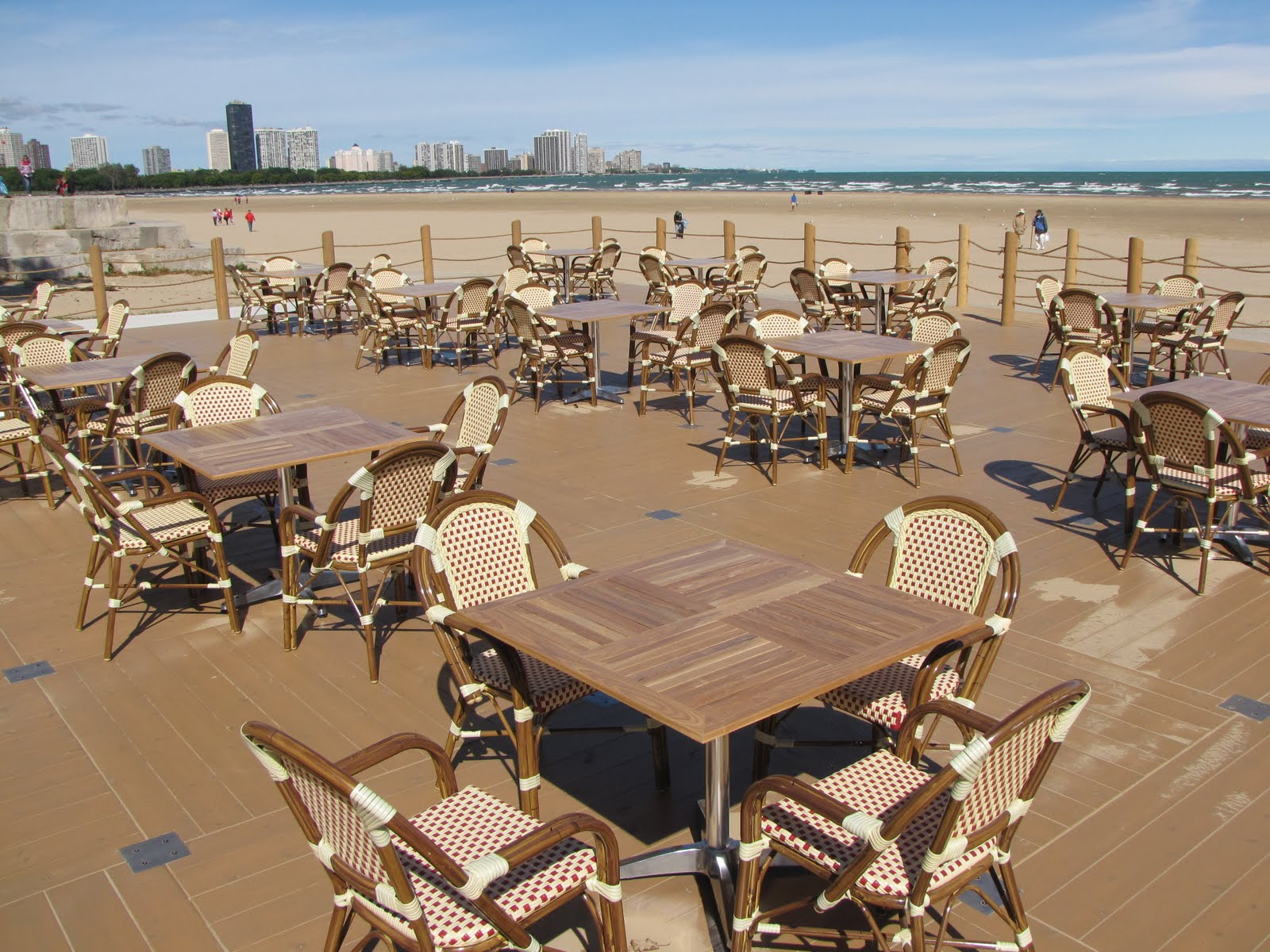
New patio deck addition to the beach house

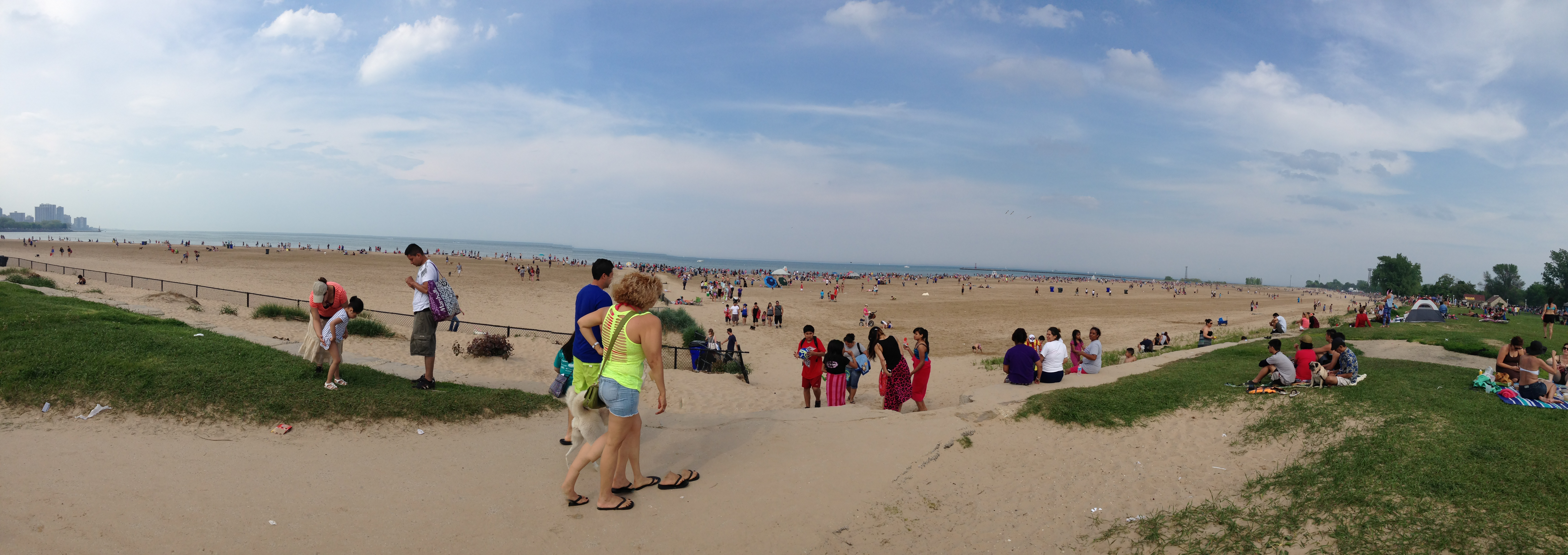
A panorama of the beach in May 2014

Montrose beach is Chicago's largest beach. It is located in Uptown. It also houses the most parking of any beach in Chicago. It is one of few beaches where patrons may launch non-motorized watercraft, such as kayaks and catamarans, into Lake Michigan. It also has one of only two dog beaches in the Chicago Park District, making it a popular beach for dog lovers. In the fenced-off section at the north end of the beach, leashless dogs are permitted on the sand. Montrose beach hosts the Junior Guard regional championships, the annual Beach Soccer Festival, and numerous runs and walks for various charities. The beach house on the south end of the beach was designed by E.V. Buchsbaum. It was modeled after the North Avenue Beach house and looks like a lake steamer. In the 1950s, the east wing of the beach house burned in a fire and was not rebuilt. The beach house was remodeled with a 3,000-square-foot (280 m^{2}) patio deck, and houses what was at the time of its construction, the third full-service restaurant on a Chicago beach, named "The Dock at Montrose Beach", following the Oak Street Beachstro and North Avenue's Castaways. It was part of the Park District's plan to add "more upscale concessions to the lakefront". Due to budget constraints in 2010, Chicago eliminated the traditional July 3 fireworks in Grant Park, instead opting for a scaled-down fireworks displays in three different locations in Chicago on the 4th of July. The north side display was held annually at Montrose Beach until further budget cuts eliminated it in 2014.

=== North Avenue Beach ===
41.9175°N 87.6275°W

North Avenue Beach

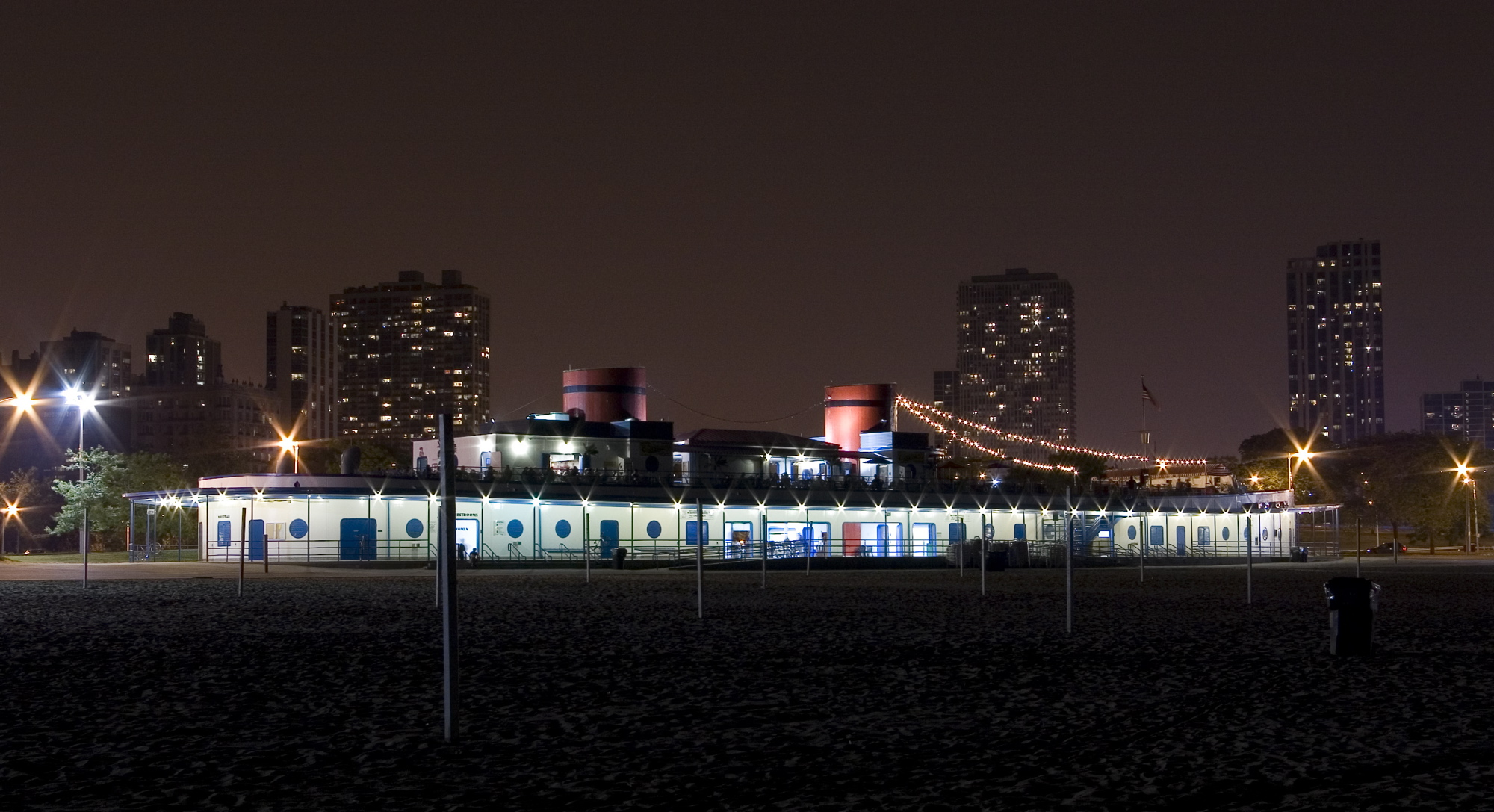
At night facing the beach house

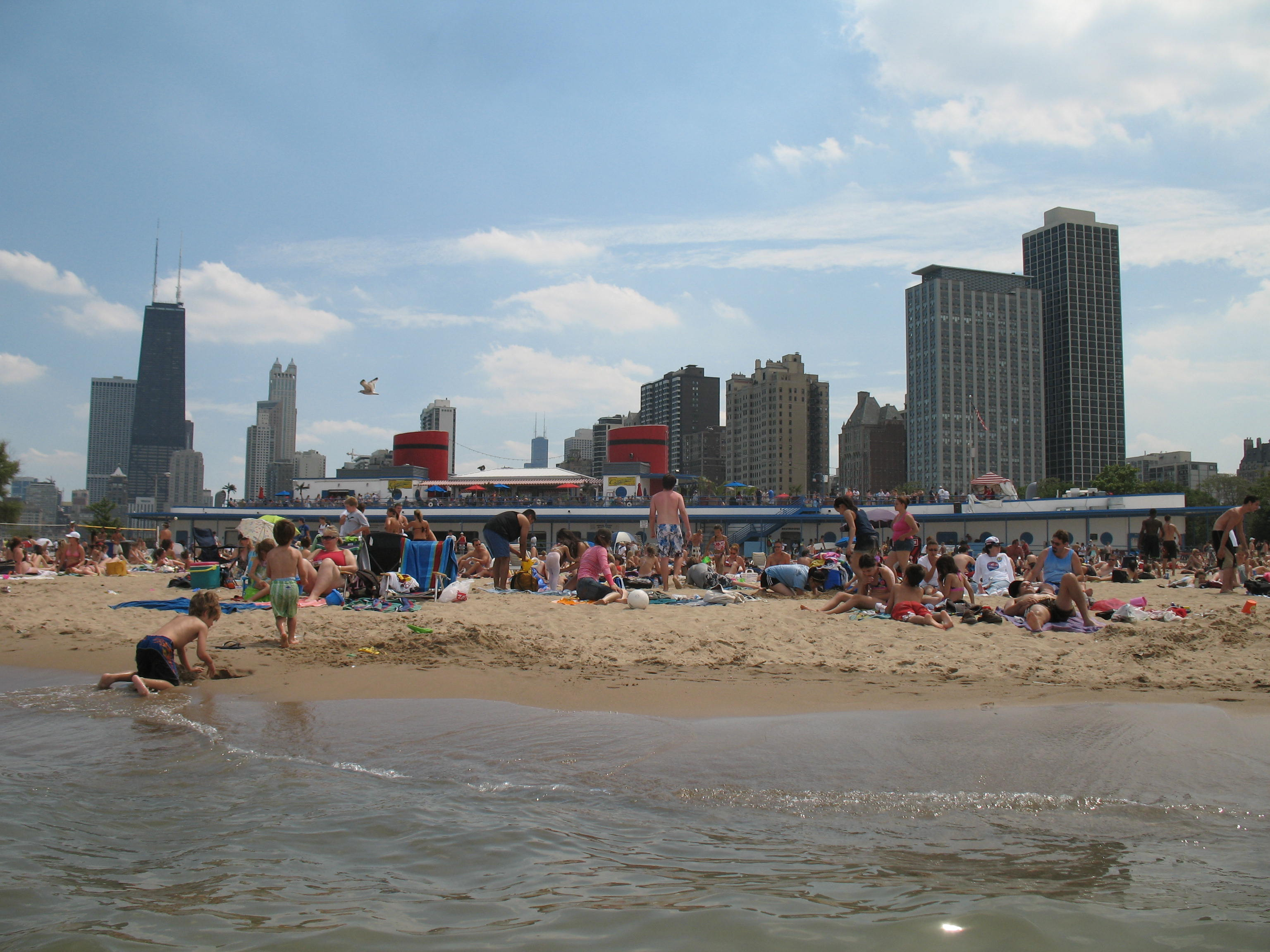
During day facing the beach house

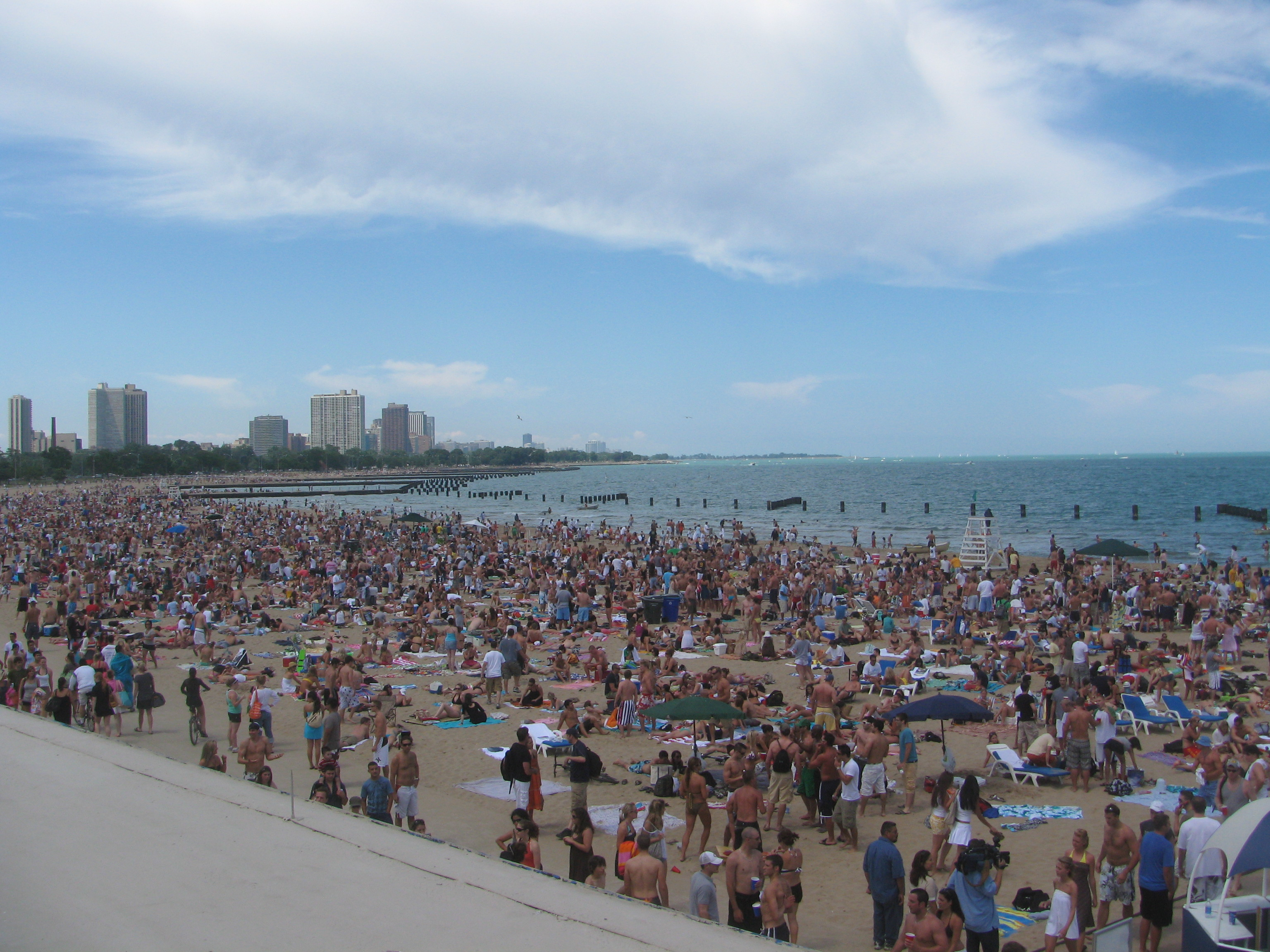
Independence Day 2008 from the beach house

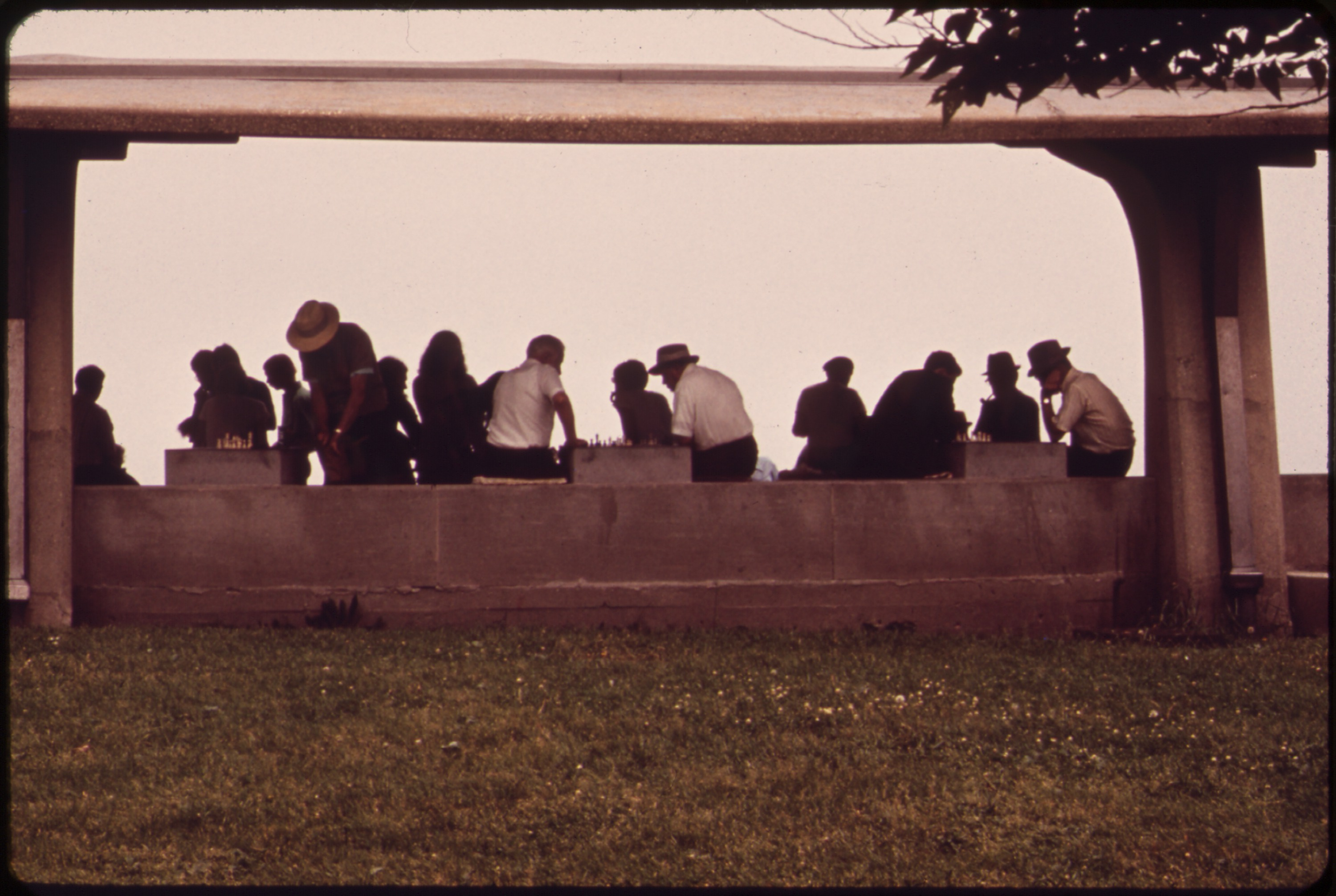
Chess players at North Ave beach in 1973

The North Avenue Beach is located at 1600 North. It has the largest lifeguard staff and is home to the most developed beachhouse. Running from North Avenue to Diversey Harbor in the Lincoln Park neighborhood, North Avenue Beach is characterized by its piers which hold the sand in place and create a scalloped shoreline, terminating in a Cape Cod-like hook. The beach hosts international volleyball tournaments as well as millions of sun worshippers every year. Chicago Park District lines the beach with poles for individuals and leagues to hang volleyball nets. These nets and this portion of the lakefront bike/running/blading path attract large numbers of people on weekends and weeknights. North Avenue is also center stage for the Chicago Air & Water Show, which draws over a million people a day from Ohio to Diversey along the lakefront. North Avenue Beach is the site of the annual AVP Chicago Open.

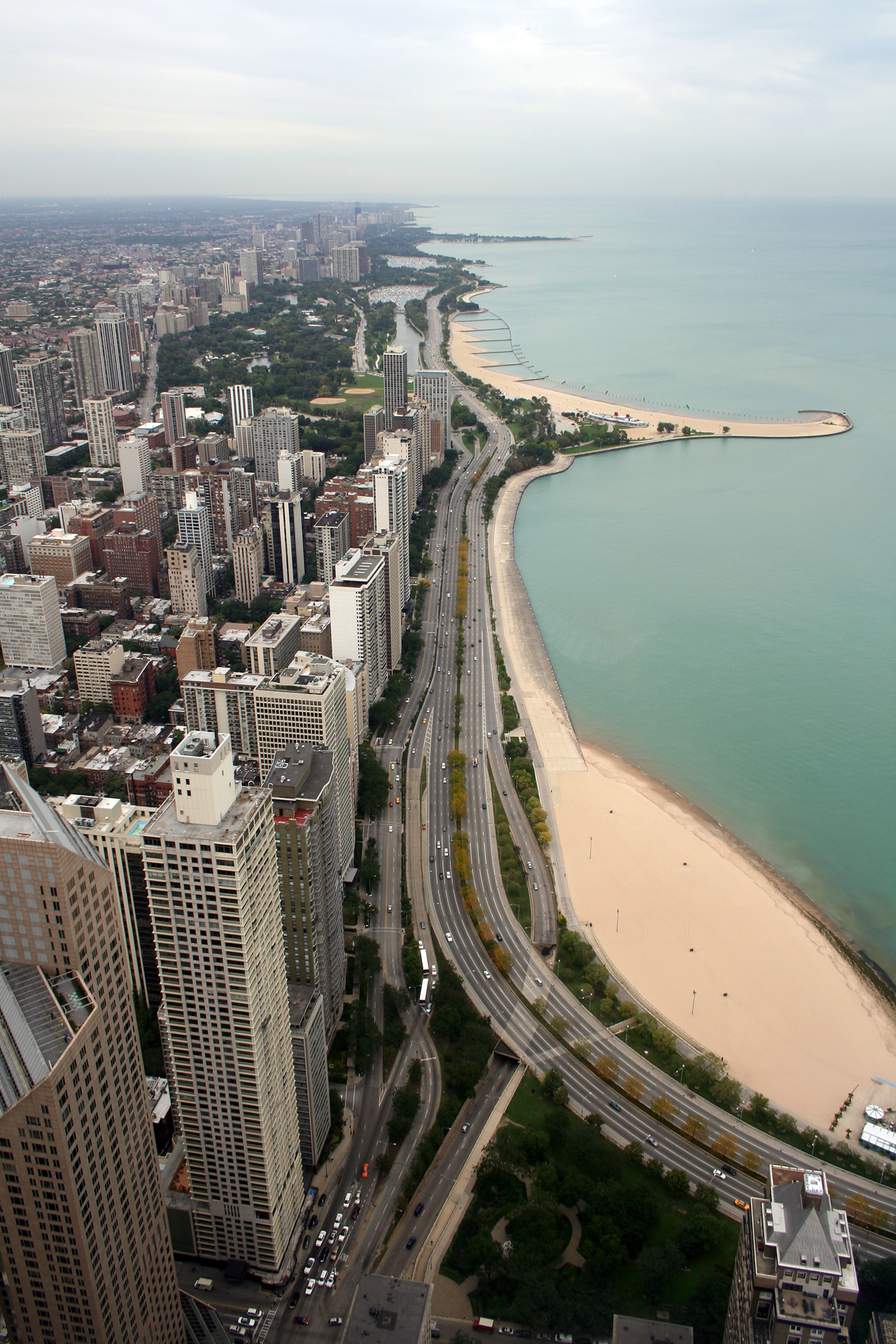
Looking north, Oak Street Beach (bottom right) and North Ave Beach viewed from above

The beach house resembles an ocean liner and contains bike and sports equipment rental, a bar and restaurant (Castaways), concession stand, a lifeguard station, and restrooms.

=== Oak Street Beach ===
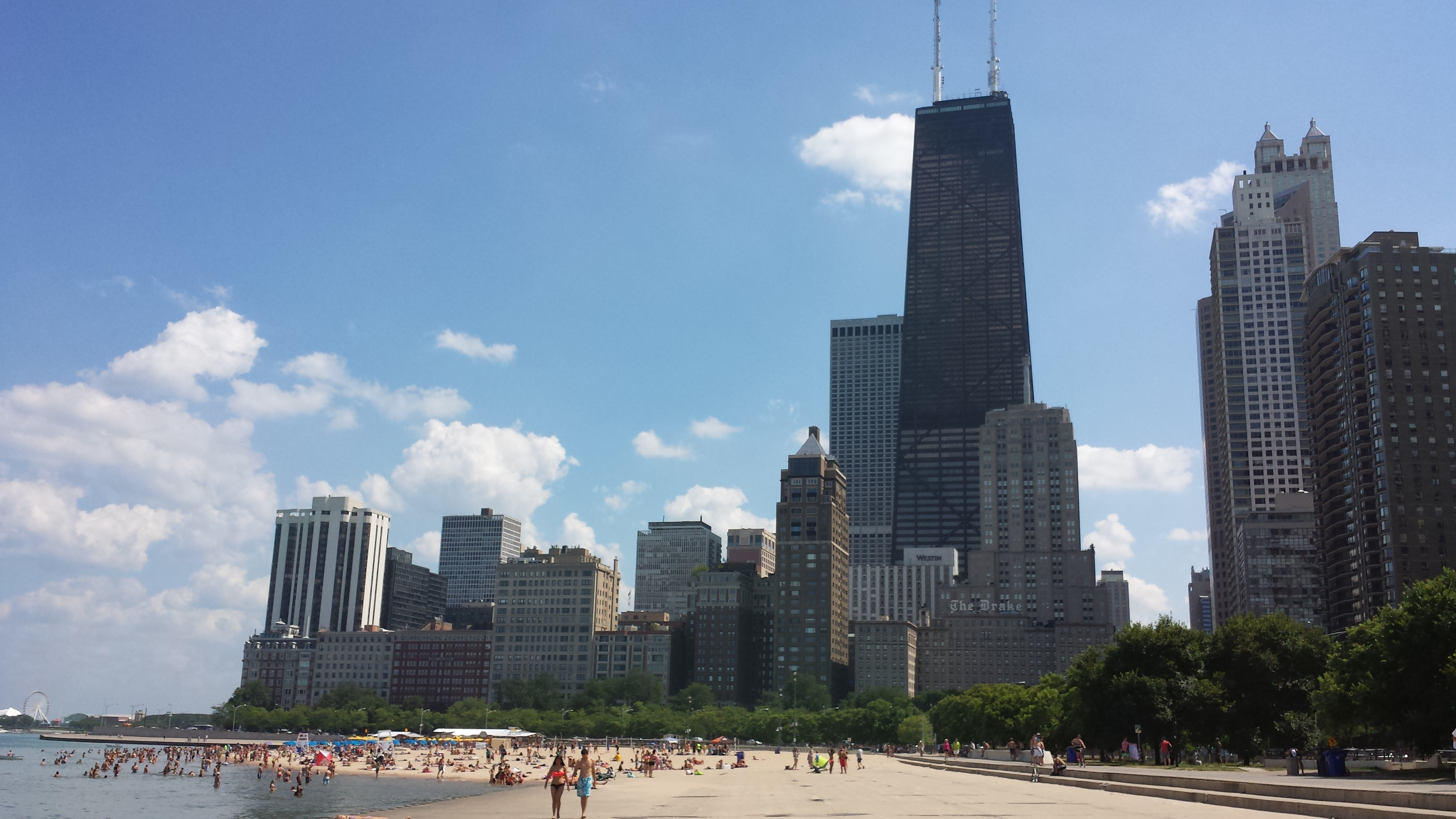
Oak Street Beach Chicago

Oak Street Beach, located at 1000 North, covers the area from the North Avenue 'Hook' Pier south to Ohio Street Beach (Illinois St. Beach, Olive Beach), about 1.5 mi (2 km). Oak Street is home to the largest area of deep water swimming in the city (1/2 mile (800 m) over 10 ft (3.0 m)). Until 2006 Oak Street Beach was also the only place in the city where SCUBA divers could dive close to the shore. The north ledge was once a hot spot for the city's gay community, and still is a second home to thousands of sunbathers, runners, skaters and bikers. At one point Oak Street was the city's most popular beach with its proximity to downtown and boasted tens of thousands of visitors each day. Oak Street Beach is also home to Chicago's only chess pavilion and a seasonal outdoor restaurant called the Whispers.

=== Ohio Street Beach ===
41.8936°N 87.6125°W

This beach, located in Lincoln Park adjacent to Addams Memorial Park and Olive Park, is just north of Ohio Street (600 N) east of Lake Shore Drive. It faces north, rather than the usual east, because it formed on its own in a bay created by the Jardine Water Purification Plant which juts out into the Lake. Due to its unusual orientation, Ohio Street Beach serves as an ideal training site for open water swimming. One can swim north 0.5 miles (800 m) to the Oak Street curve without ever being more than a few feet from the seawall and shallow water.

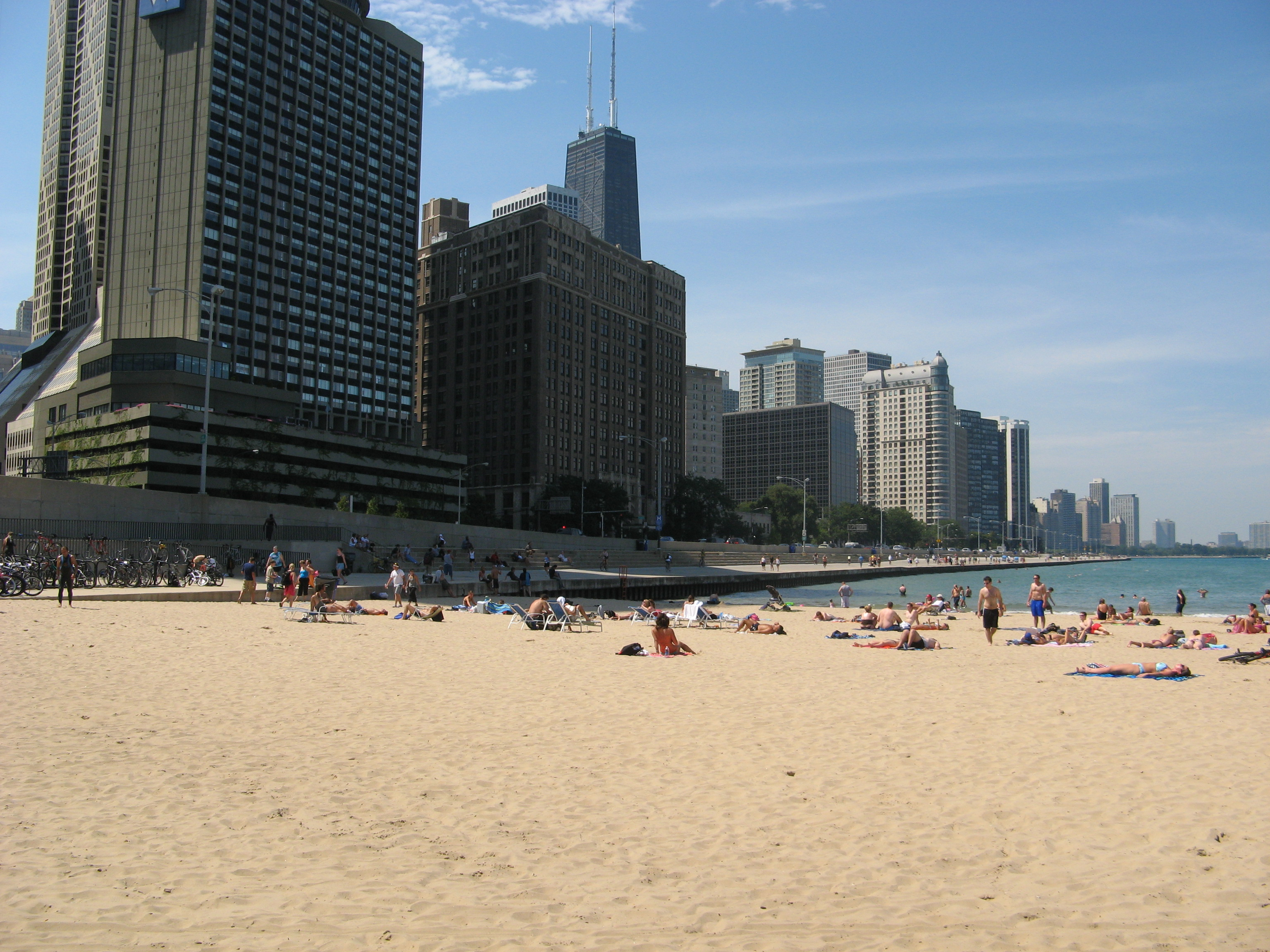

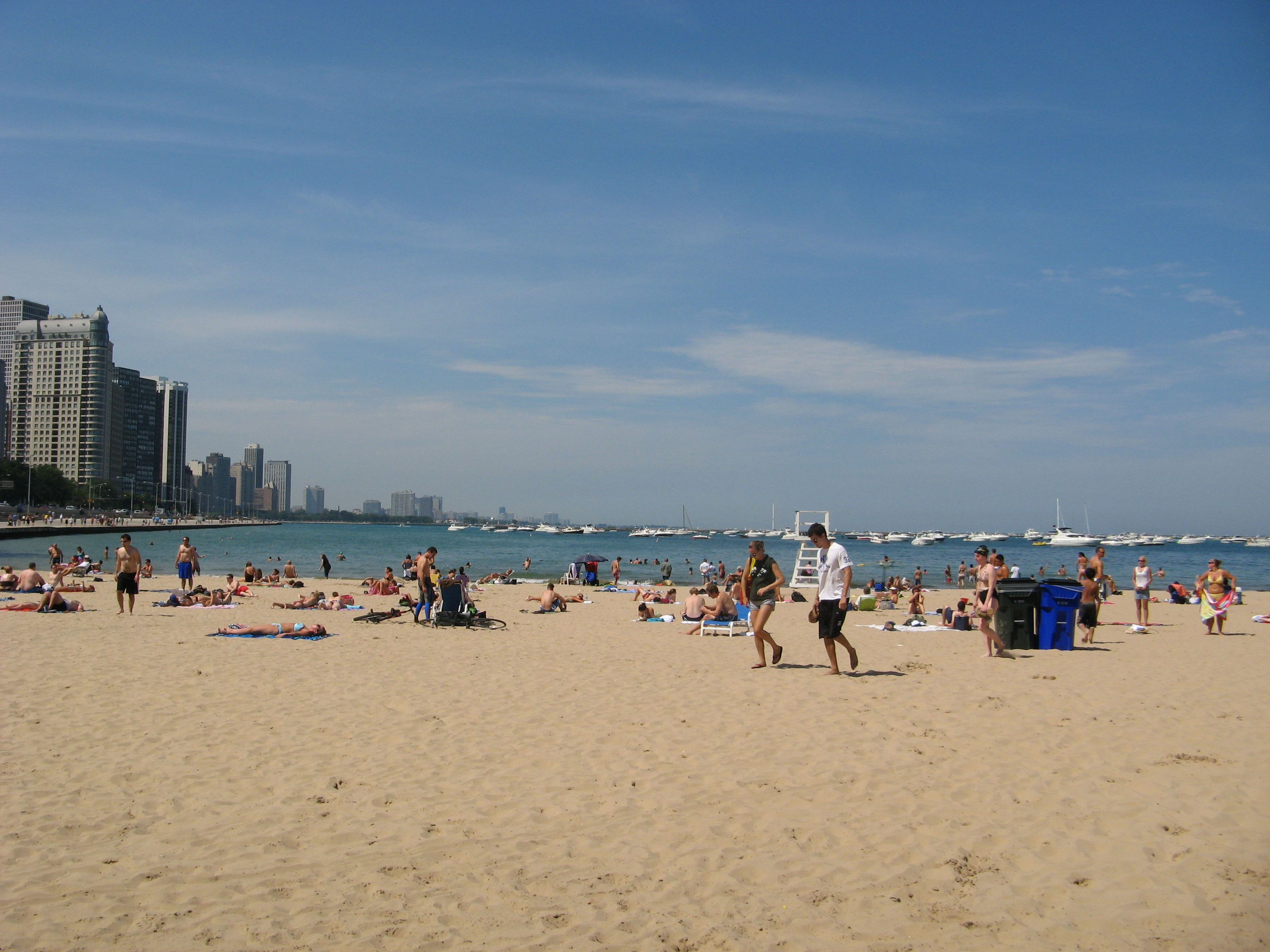

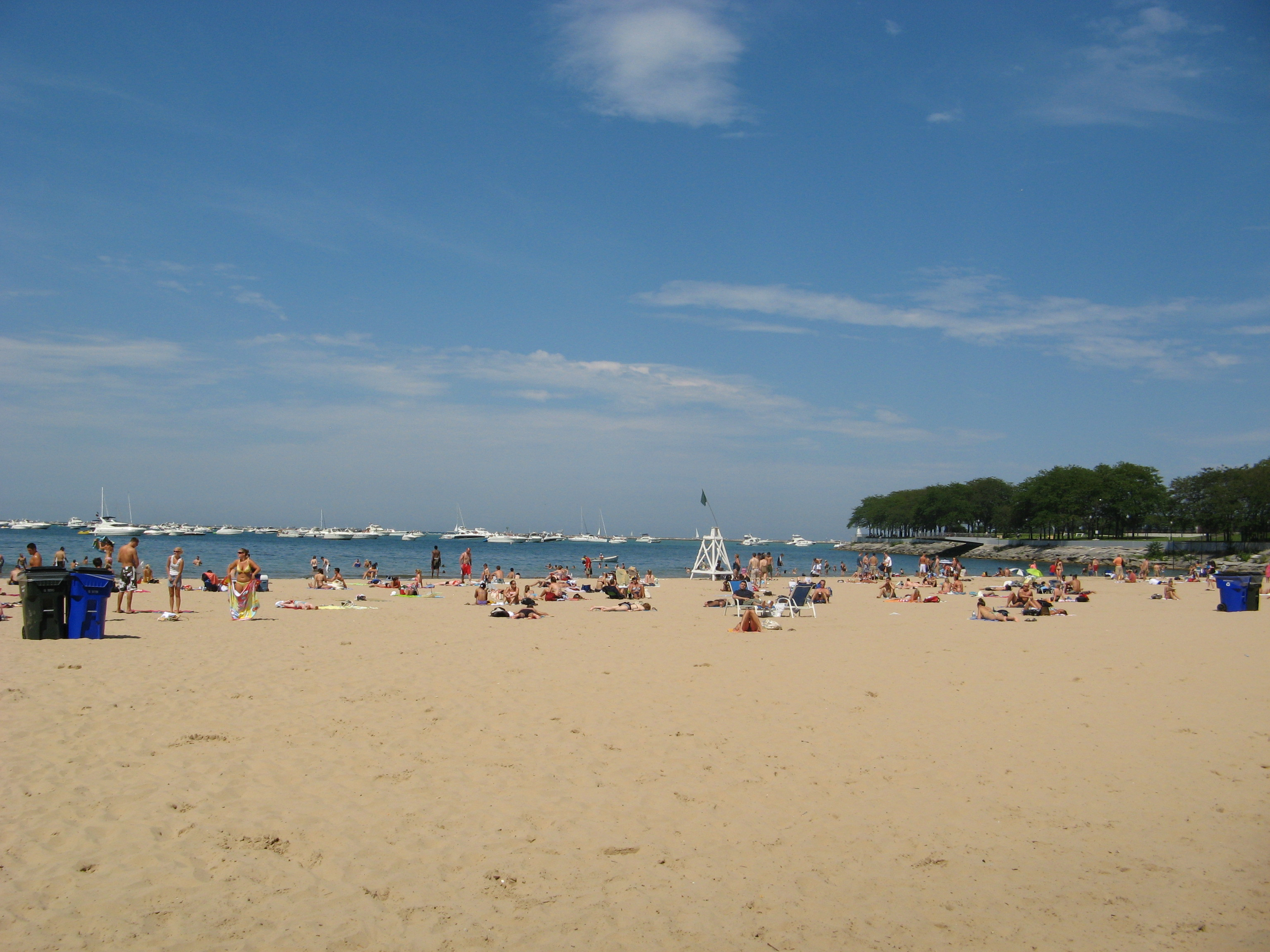

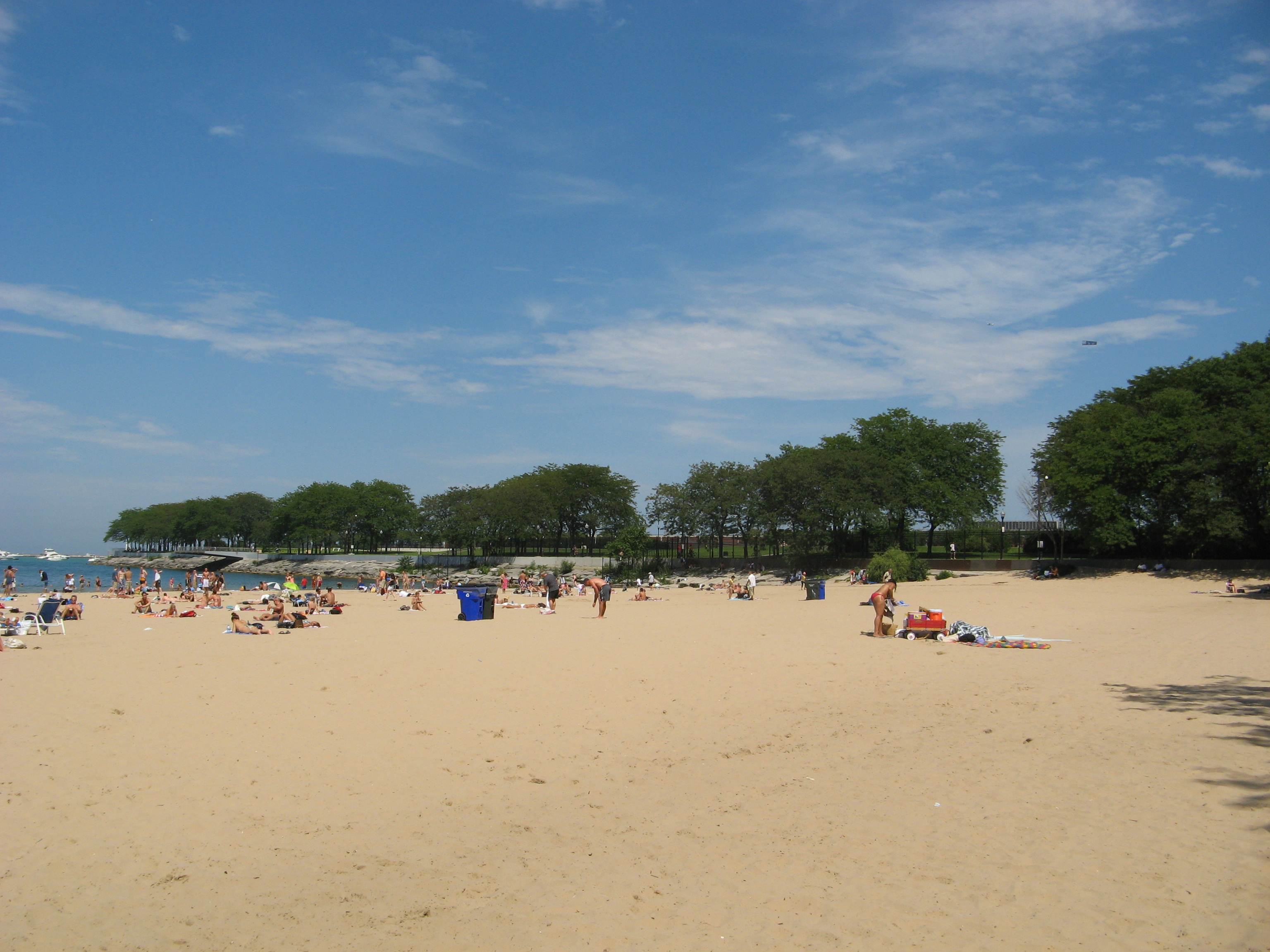

== Humboldt Park Beach ==
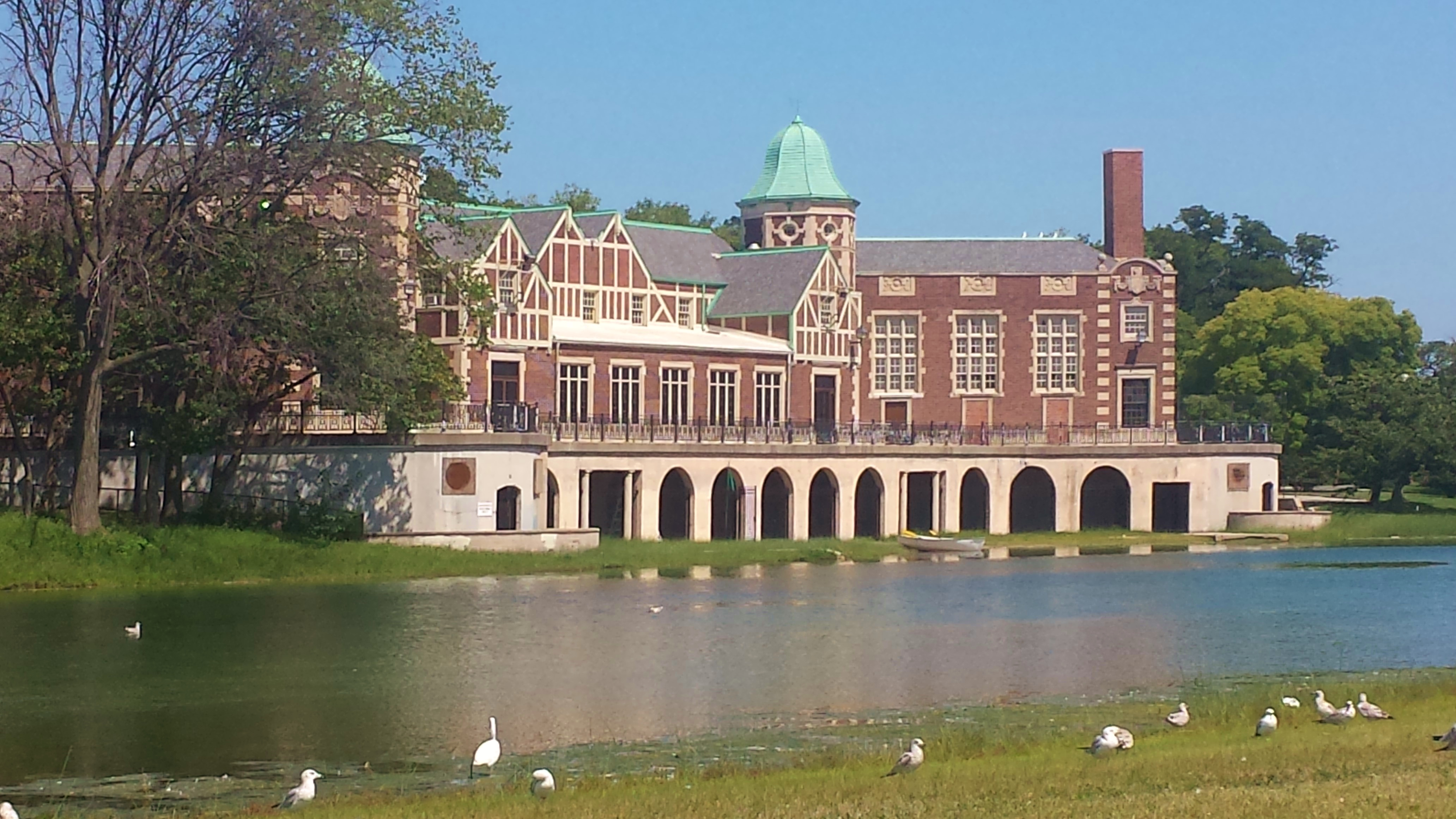
Humboldt Park Lagoon and Fieldhouse

This is not a lakefront beach. It is located in a former lagoon of Humboldt Park which was dredged and given a sand bottom. At 41.9066°N 87.7031°W, this "beach" is mostly used by small children as a shallow wading pond. It is guarded in the summer and drained when not guarded.

== Burnham Park ==
Burnham Park runs for 6 miles (9.7 km) along Chicago's lakefront from Grant Park in the north to Jackson Park in the south, through the neighborhoods of Near South, Douglas, Oakland, Kenwood and Hyde Park.

=== 12th Street Beach ===
41°51′48.53″N 87°36′26.97″W

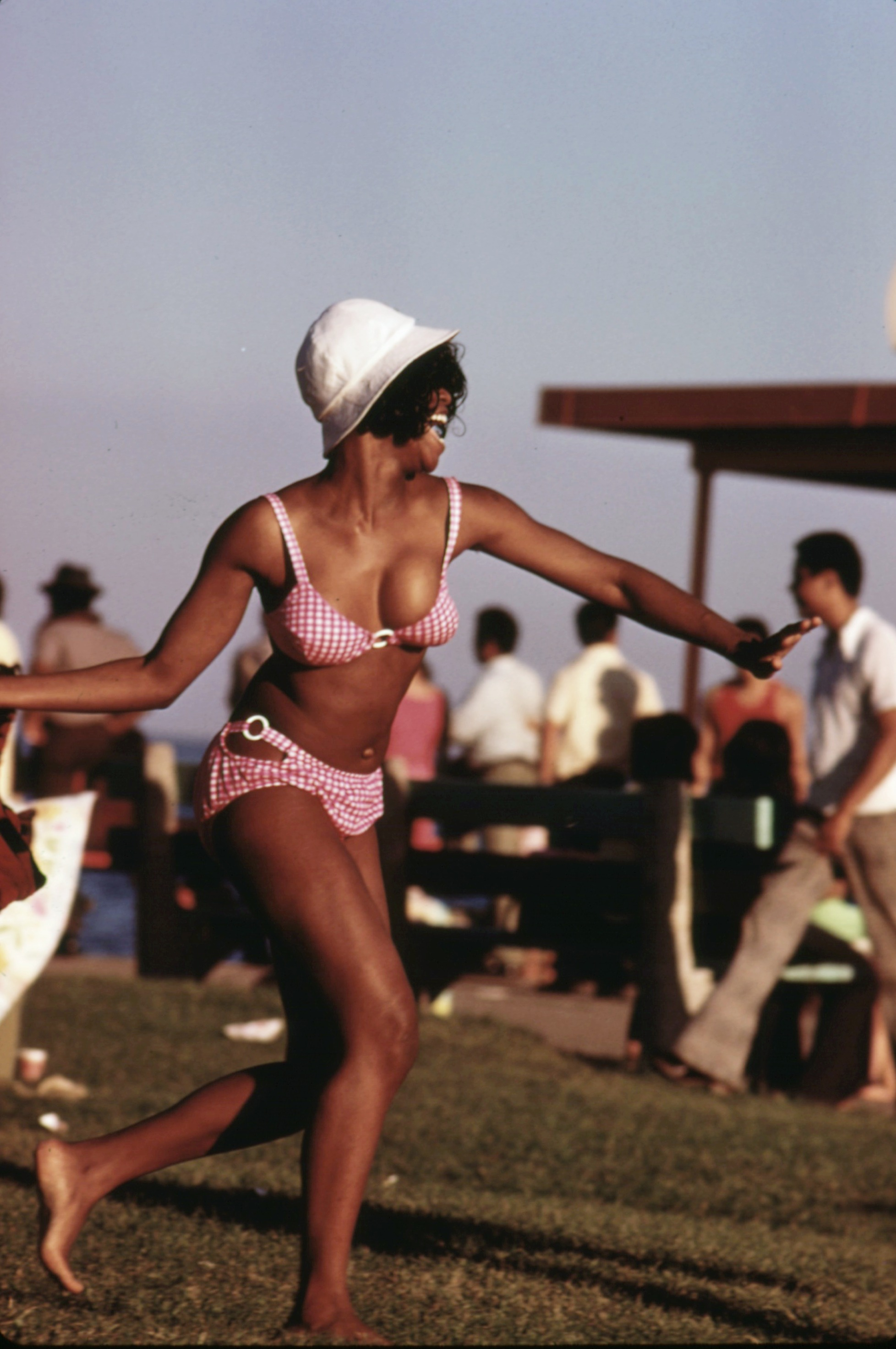
A woman enjoying herself on the lawn just off 12th Street Beach in 1973

The 12th Street Beach is just south of the Adler Planetarium on Northerly Island (formerly the site of Meigs Field). The beach runs from about 1300 S to about 1450 S, but was named 12th Street Beach rather than (unlucky) 13th Street Beach. When 12th Street was renamed Roosevelt Road the beach retained its name, but now is sometimes called 14th Street Beach. There is also open water swimming that is great for triathletes or avid open water swimmers. The beach has bathrooms, a concession stand, and a lifeguard station.

=== 25th/26th Street Beaches ===
No longer extant, of the Chicago Race Riot of 1919.

=== Margaret Taylor Burroughs (31st Street) Beach ===
41°50′20.75″N 87°36′22.49″W

The Margaret Taylor Burroughs Beach is located in Burnham Park near 31st Street. The beach is host every year to the Junior Lifeguard Chicago Area Tug-o-War. Near the beachouse is a large modern playground.

In 2015, it was named in honor of artist, educator and museum founder, Margaret Taylor-Burroughs. Burroughs was a founder of the DuSable Museum of African American History and the Southside Community Art Center

=== Oakwood / 41st Street Beach ===
4100 S. Lake Shore Drive (41st St. and Lake Michigan, parking at Oakwood Blvd.)

=== 49th Street Beach ===
49th Street Beach is a small stone beach in Burnham Park. It is not guarded, so swimming is not allowed.

=== 57th Street Beach ===
41°47′29.88″N 87°34′46.16″W

The 57th Street Beach is in the city's Hyde Park neighborhood, across Lake Shore Drive from the Museum of Science and Industry. Two large pedestrian underpasses at the intersection of 57th Street and Lake Shore Drive give access. Its long shoreline crosses from Burnham Park into Jackson Park. 57th Street Beach provides an area of deep swimming south of Promontory Point.

== 63rd Street Beach ==
41°46′55.43″N 87°34′22.83″W

The 63rd Street Beach is in Jackson Park. It is home to the largest and oldest beach house in the city. In July 1913, Jackson Park Beach was the site of a clash over required bathing attire when Dr. Rosalie Ladova was arrested for disorderly conduct for swimming in her bloomers after removing her bathing skirt. The establishment of the landmark beach house came about due to the residents of the area complaining to the city to extend the beach. Thus in 1914, the city ordered a 10-acre (40,000 m^{2}) expansion to 63rd St. The South Park Commission architects came up with the plan to build the 63rd Street Pavilion. The construction was completed in 1919. The building historically provided showers, medical rooms, and bathrooms. Due to the building's age, it was restored in 2000. Today the pavilion is used by boaters, beach goers, and can be used for special events.

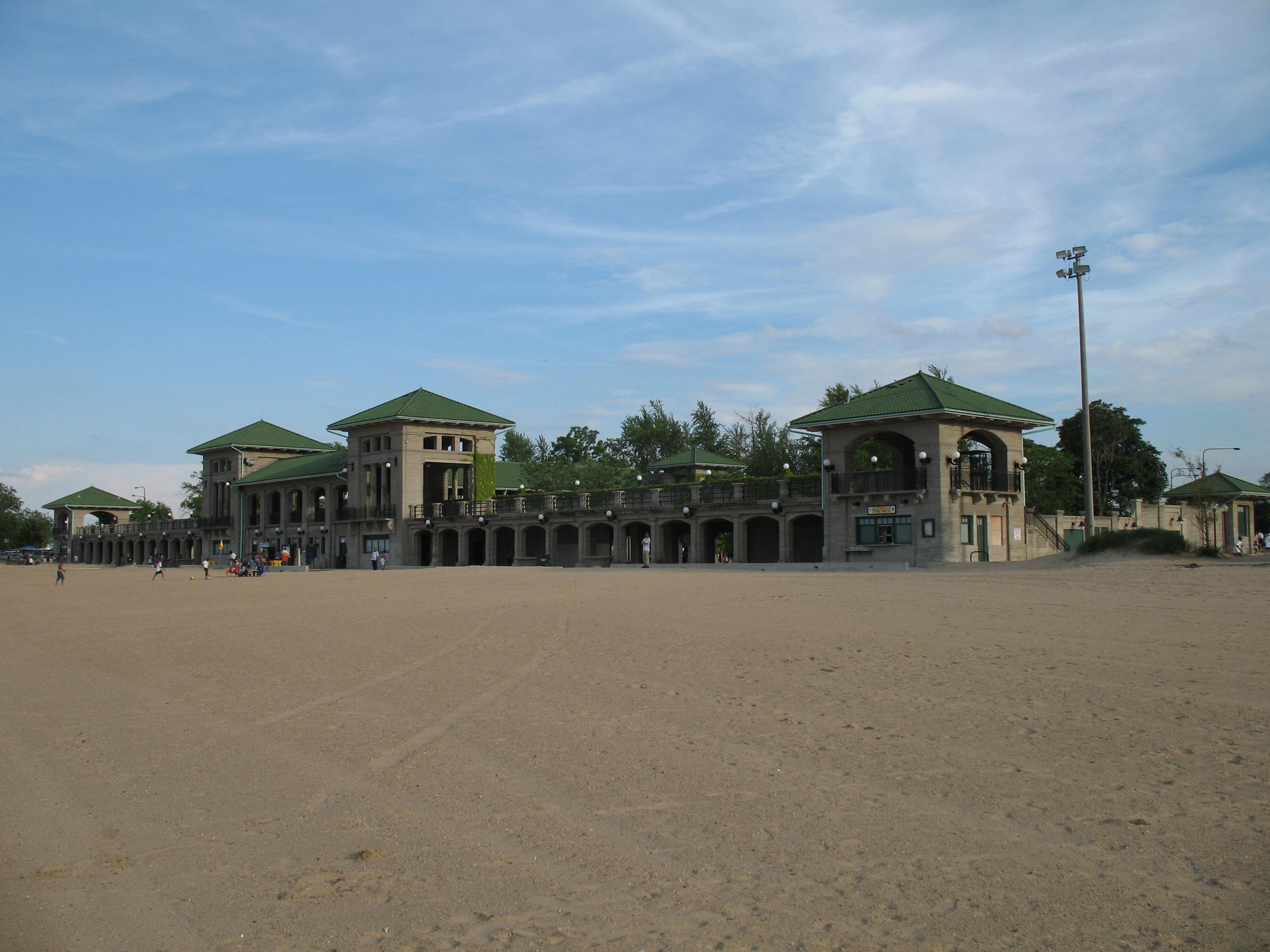
63rd Street Bathing Pavilion

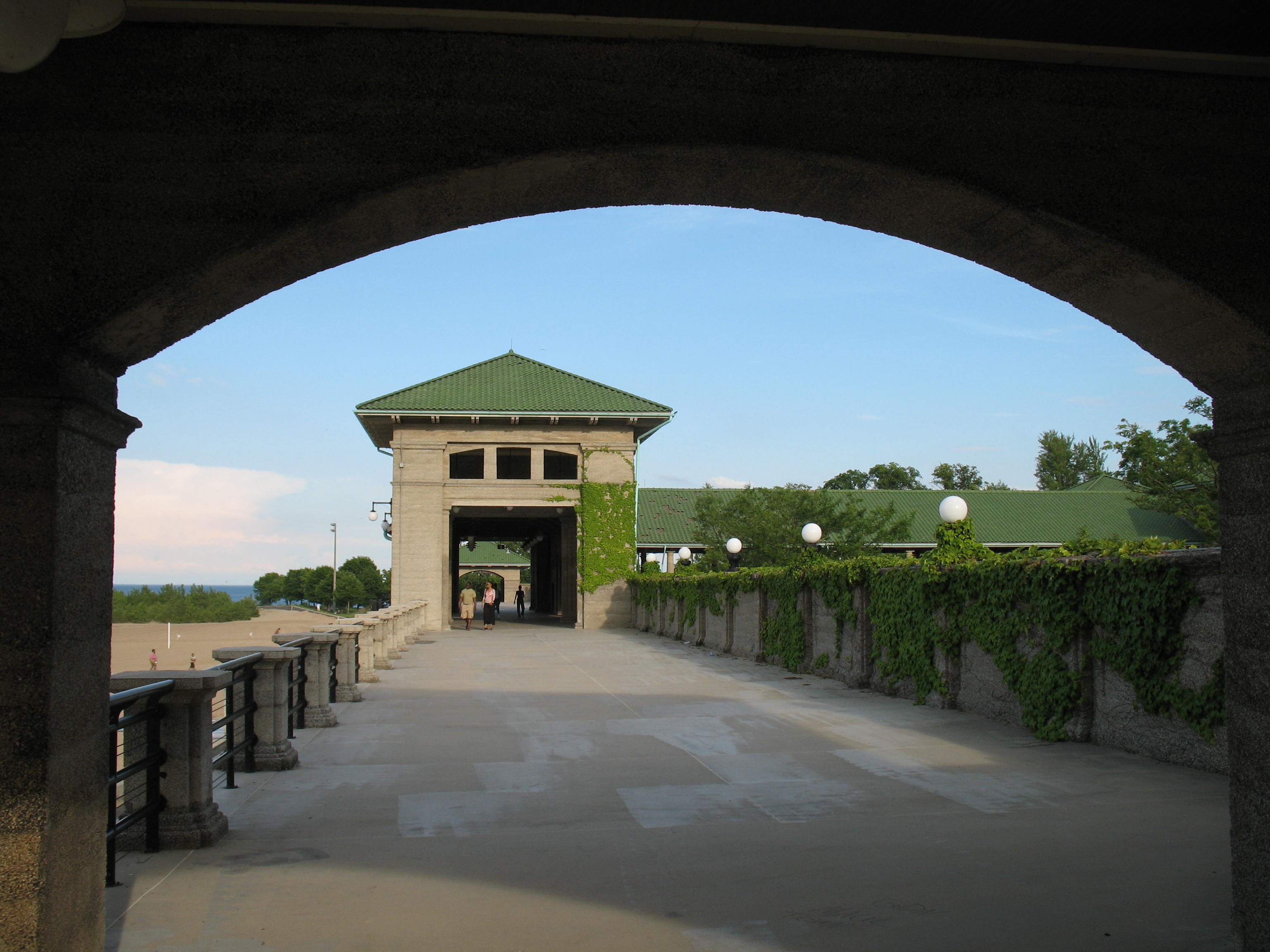

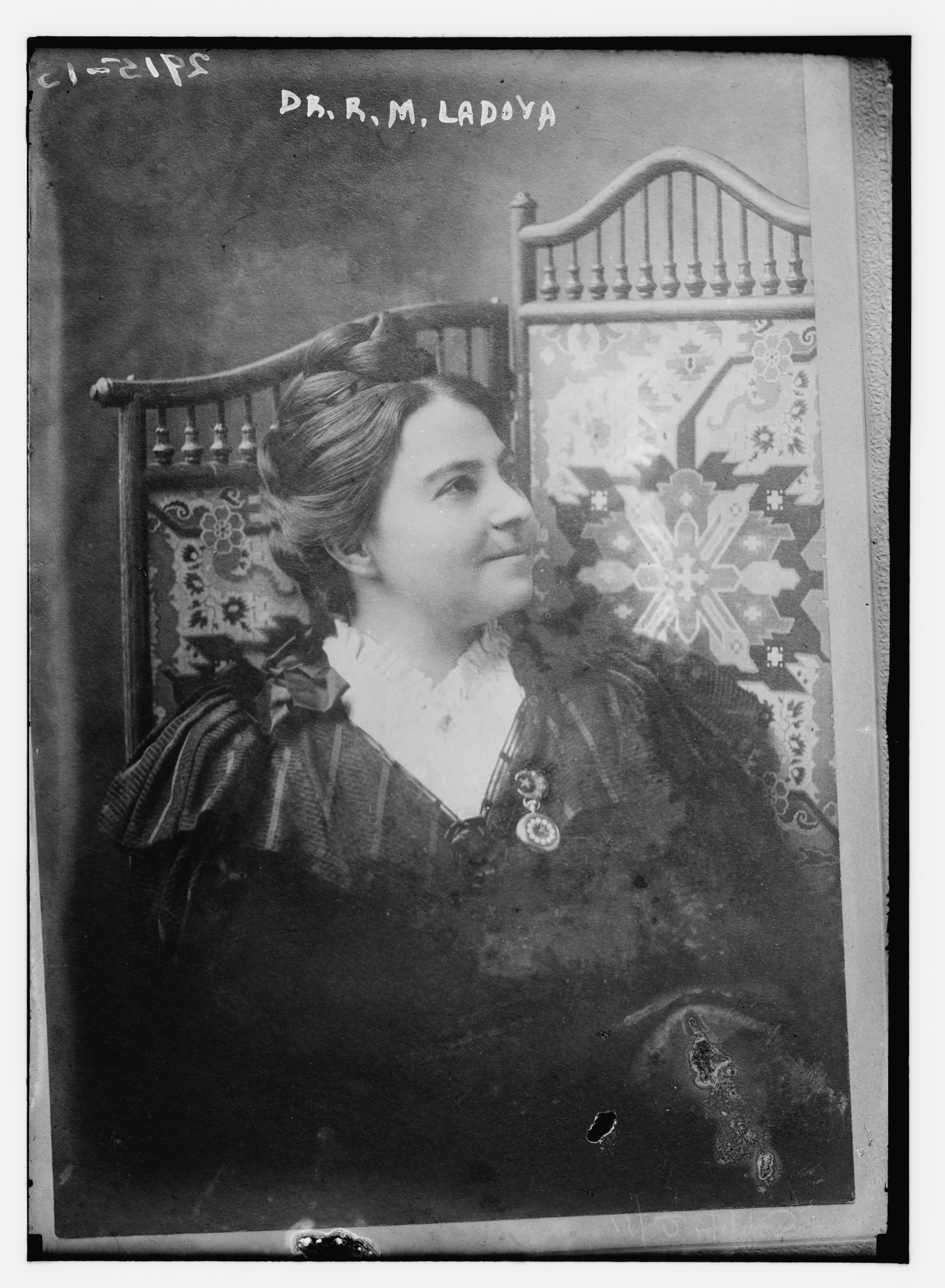
Dr. Rosalie M. Ladova

== South Shore ==
There are three beach areas in the South Shore, Chicago community.

=== South Shore Beach ===
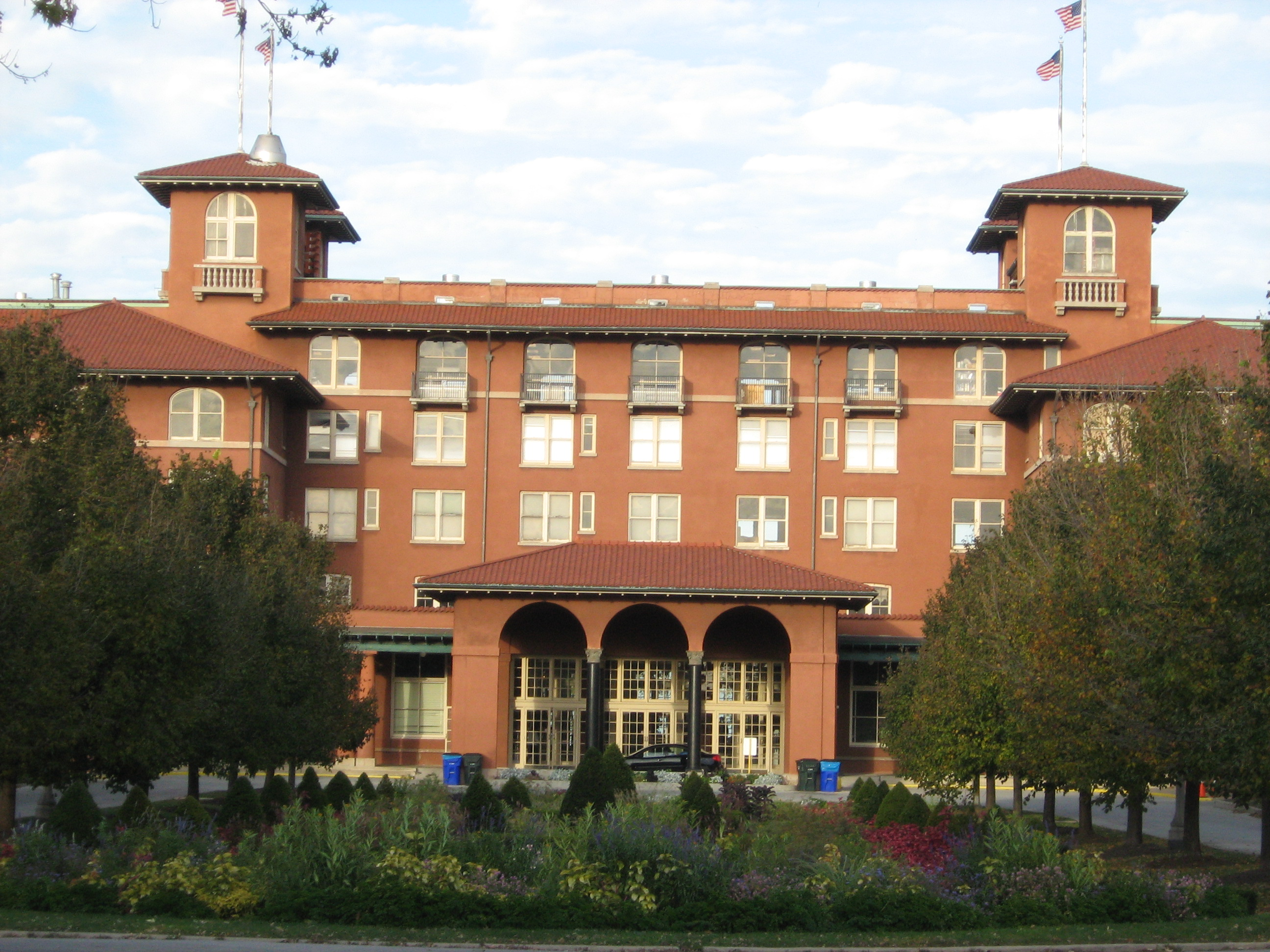
South Shore Cultural Center

South Shore Beach is the beach connected with the Chicago Park District's South Shore Cultural Center (formerly South Shore Country Club), which is located at the intersection of 71st Street and South Shore Drive. The Country Club is home to a ballroom, restaurant, golf course and tennis courts. The Beach also runs up against Jackson Park to the north.

=== Ashe Beach ===
Ashe Beach Park is a newer addition to the Chicago Park District's beaches, bought in 1979 and named for the late tennis great Arthur Ashe, after he died of AIDS in 1993. In addition to the beach, the park features two tennis courts. It is located between 74th and 75th Streets in the South Shore community.

=== Rainbow Beach ===
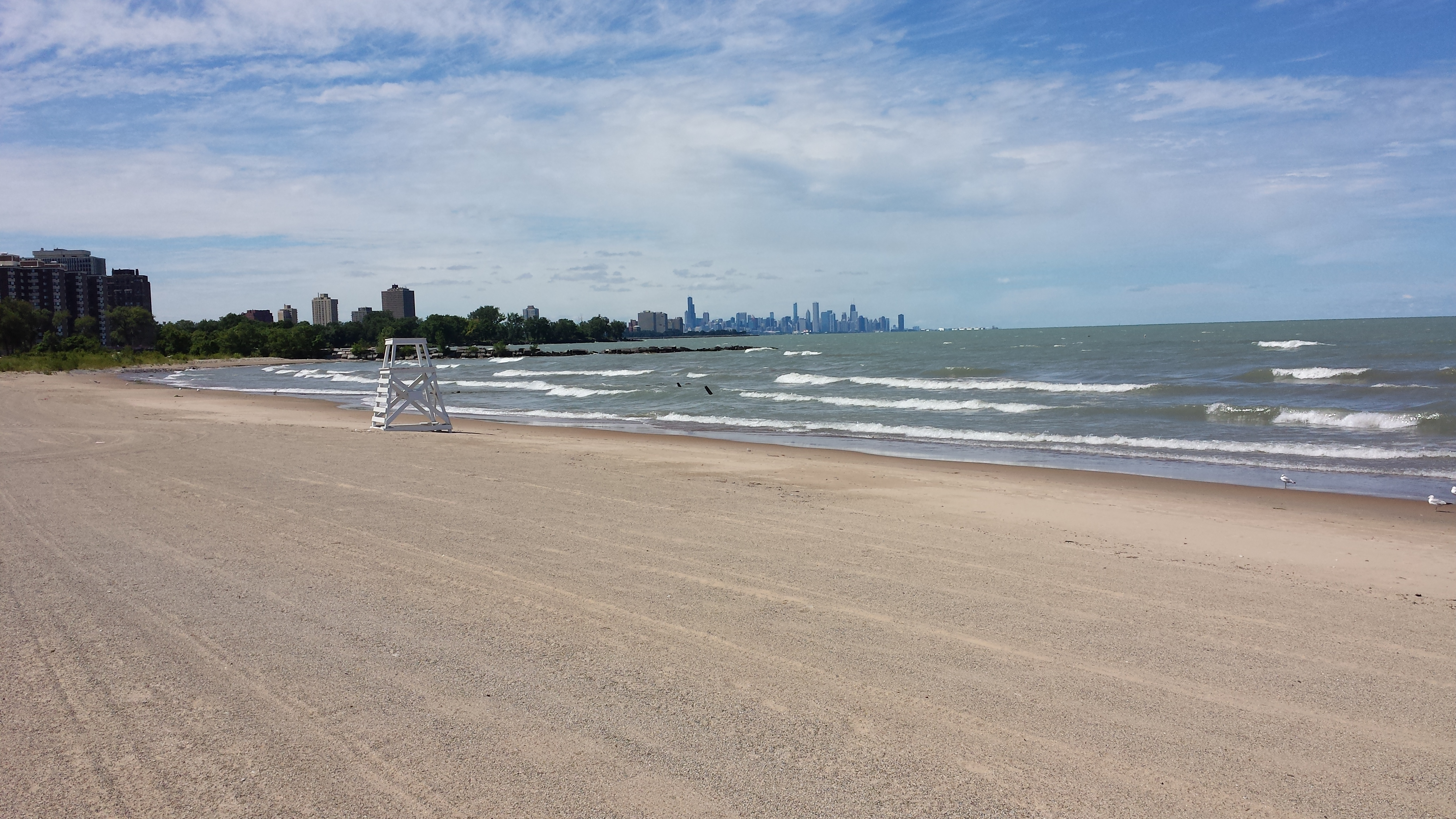
Rainbow Park Beach Chicago

Rainbow Beach is officially located at 3111 E. 77th St., is a beach in the Chicago Park District's Rainbow Beach & Park that stretches from 75th Street to 78th Street on the Lake Michigan shoreline. Rainbow Beach was named such in 1918.

Starting with the 1919 Race Riot, Chicago had a history of race related disturbances in the 20th century related to use of public resources, such as parks and beaches. Rainbow Beach was an area of controversy for black and white youth. Black families that were economically dependent on the nearby South Chicago steel mills had avoided the public hostility of the lifeguards and white bathers. Demographic shifts and racial climate change of the 1960s led to a July 7 and 8, 1961 “freedom wade-in” at Rainbow Beach staged by an interracial coalition of demonstrators, including members of the NAACP Youth Council.

== Calumet Park ==
41.7179°N 87.5294°W

The park district's Calumet Park, which is not to be confused with the nearby city of Calumet Park, IL, has a mile of lakefront and contains three beaches located at the 9600, 9800 and 9900 South blocks along Lake Michigan (what would be 96th, 98th and 99th streets). The main beach has a Beach House with a concessions stand. The park is in the East Side neighborhood. Forming part of Chicago's city limit, the park reaches to the border between Illinois and Indiana.

== See also ==
- List of beaches
- List of beaches in the United States
