= 63rd Street Bathing Pavilion =

Historic landmark in Chicago, Illinois

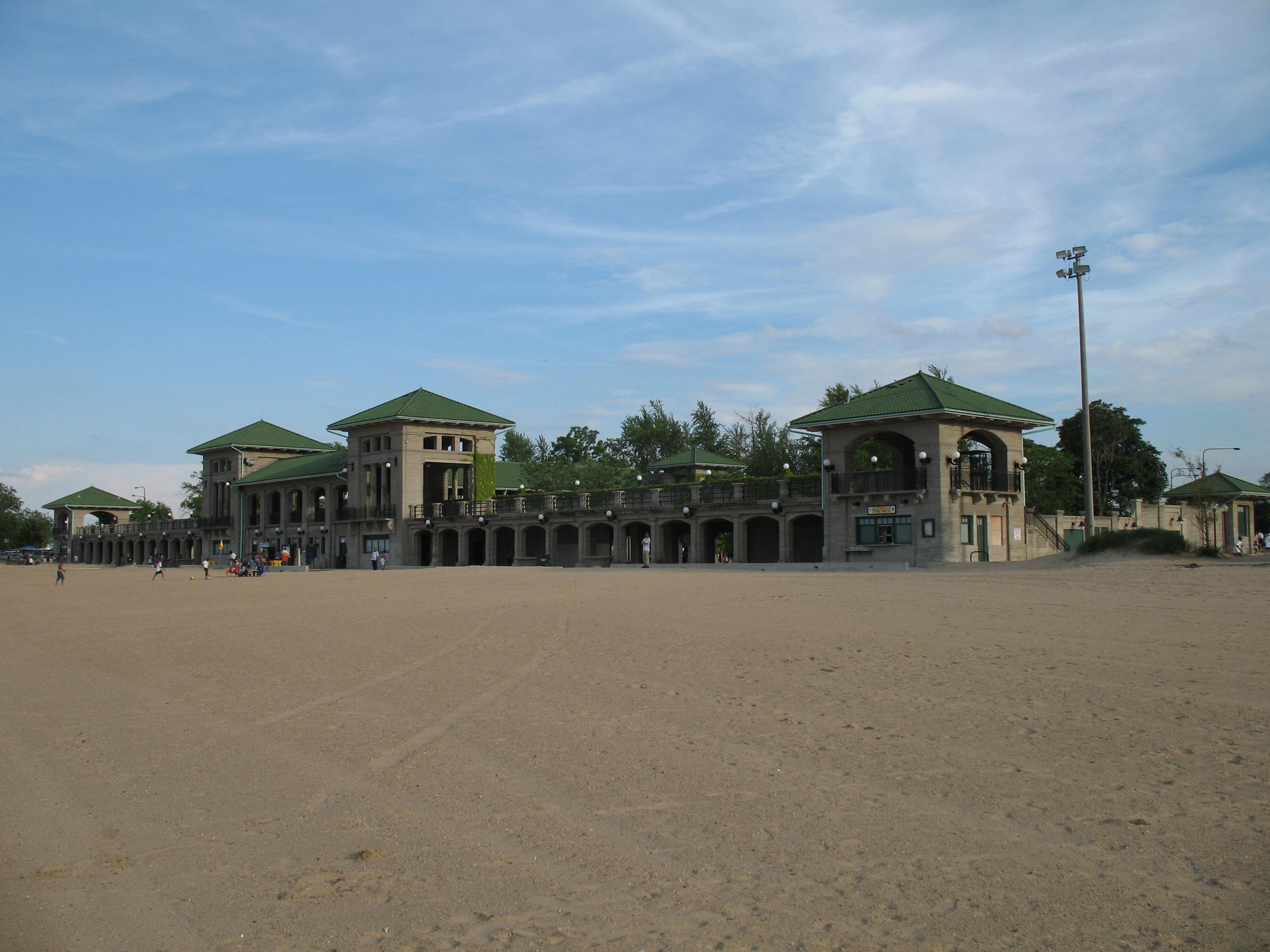
- View of the pavilion from the beach
- Interactive map of the 63rd Street Bathing Pavilion area

General information
- Status: Completed
- Type: Pavilion
- Architectural style: Classical Revival
- Location: Intersection of S. Lake Shore Drive and E. 63rd Street, Chicago, Illinois, United States
- Coordinates: 41°46′53″N 87°34′26″W
- Year built: 1919

Chicago Landmark
- Designated: December 8, 2004

The 63rd Street Bathing Pavilion is a historic building in Chicago, Illinois, United States. Constructed in 1919, the pavilion is located at 63rd Street Beach in Jackson Park in the Woodlawn community area.

The building is Chicago's oldest beach house and was designated as a Chicago Landmark on December 8, 2004.

== Architecture ==
The bathing pavilion, largely Classical in design, was designed by in-house architects at Chicago's South Park Commission, established in 1869 to oversee the development of boulevards and parks south of the Chicago River.

The design of the 63rd Street Bathing Pavilion was inspired by the classical-style "White City" buildings of the 1893 World's Columbian Exposition that were planned by Daniel H. Burnham. The Prairie style is also present, subtly suggested in the design of the bathing pavilion with its long, horizontal proportions, square towers, and rooflines with wide, projecting eaves.

== Description ==
The 63rd Street Bathing Pavilion is a long, rectangular building – 460 feet in length and 145 feet in width – with roofs covered by contemporary green tiles, replicating the building's original roofing. The four corners of the building terminate in square pavilions topped by pyramidal roofs with wide overhangs very similar to the building's higher central towers.

The building is symmetrical composed, with a central two-story mass flanked by two enclosed courtyards. Enclosed by high walls, the courtyards originally were the changing locations and shower accommodations for bathers, one for men, the other for women, with lockers and dressing rooms that could serve 2,044 women and 3,903 men.

The walls of the building are constructed entirely of poured aggregate porous concrete, giving the structure a feeling of great permanence and strength. The building material – a form of an exposed aggregate reinforced concrete which had become known as"popcorn concrete" or 'marblecrete" – was an inexpensive material from which buildings could be constructed rapidly, and was used widely by the South Park Commission.

The central block of the building consists of a two-story loggia with an open arched second story bracketed by twin towers. Covered by a gable roof supported by an impressive open metal truss, the loggia is detailed by classical pilasters on its park and beach elevations, is topped by a classical balustrade on its park elevation, and has classically inspired brackets on the building's beach elevation. Detailed by Tuscan columns, the towers are covered by pyramid-shaped roofs with very wide eaves supported by wooden brackets suggestive of the Prairie style. Similar but slightly smaller towers flank the building's entrance on the park side.

Today, the two courtyard spaces are open, the south courtyard landscaped by turf, the north by a water fountain. The beachside wall of the courtyards still includes its original ironwork railings and serves its original purpose, offering a long promenade overlooking Lake Michigan.

== Historical context ==
The late 19th century witnessed a great increase in the popularity of sporting and recreation activities in the United States, among them swimming. The 1899 completion of Chicago's innovative drainage canal which allowed for the diversion of sewage that had previously emptied into Lake Michigan increased swimming's popularity considerably. To address growing demand for beachfront access, the City of Chicago's Special Park Commission took over management of Chicago's municipal beaches in 1905.

Several years later, the commission began planning state-of-the-art bathing pavilions for Chicago, visiting well-known beaches throughout the nation in search of an appropriate model. In 1917, the South Park Commission in-house architects developed plans for the pavilion, building on lessons learned from the completion of a pavilion at the Clarendon Municipal Beach in 1916.

Creation of the pavilion was in keeping with the plans of Frederick Law Olmsted, who had designed Jackson Park and who had envisioned a bathing beach and beach pavilion as early as 1895.

Between 1916 and 1917, a ten-acre beach extension was finished, but restrictions on building materials due to World War I delayed completion of the bathing pavilion until 1919.

The bathing pavilion was first opened to the public on June 14, 1919, with the total cost of the building having exceeded $170,000.

At the time of its opening, the beach was segregated, and blacks had to use the stone beach, rather than the sand beach.

== Restoration and current use ==
The 63rd Street Beach Bathing Pavilion suffered severe deterioration over the years, from decades of wind damage and lack of use (for a while, the park district stored boats and other equipment in the courtyards). The building's fortunes reversed, however, when the Chicago Park District conducted a thorough $8 million restoration of the building in the late 1990s.

The building's original tile roof was restored, with appropriate replicate tiles and the installation of more compatible light fixtures. The building's large courtyards were also restored as large open plazas, one with an interactive water fountain.

Following the restoration, the beach house was once again used by beach patrons, boaters and day campers and is also available for rental for other special events. However, despite the restoration, the building still shows signs of ongoing deterioration.

== In popular culture ==
The building was featured in the movie, "Barbershop 2: Back in Business" in a scene in which Queen Latifah teaches defense techniques to women and the dancing fountains in the courtyard serve as a backdrop.
