= Jackson Park (Chicago) =

Public park in Chicago, Illinois

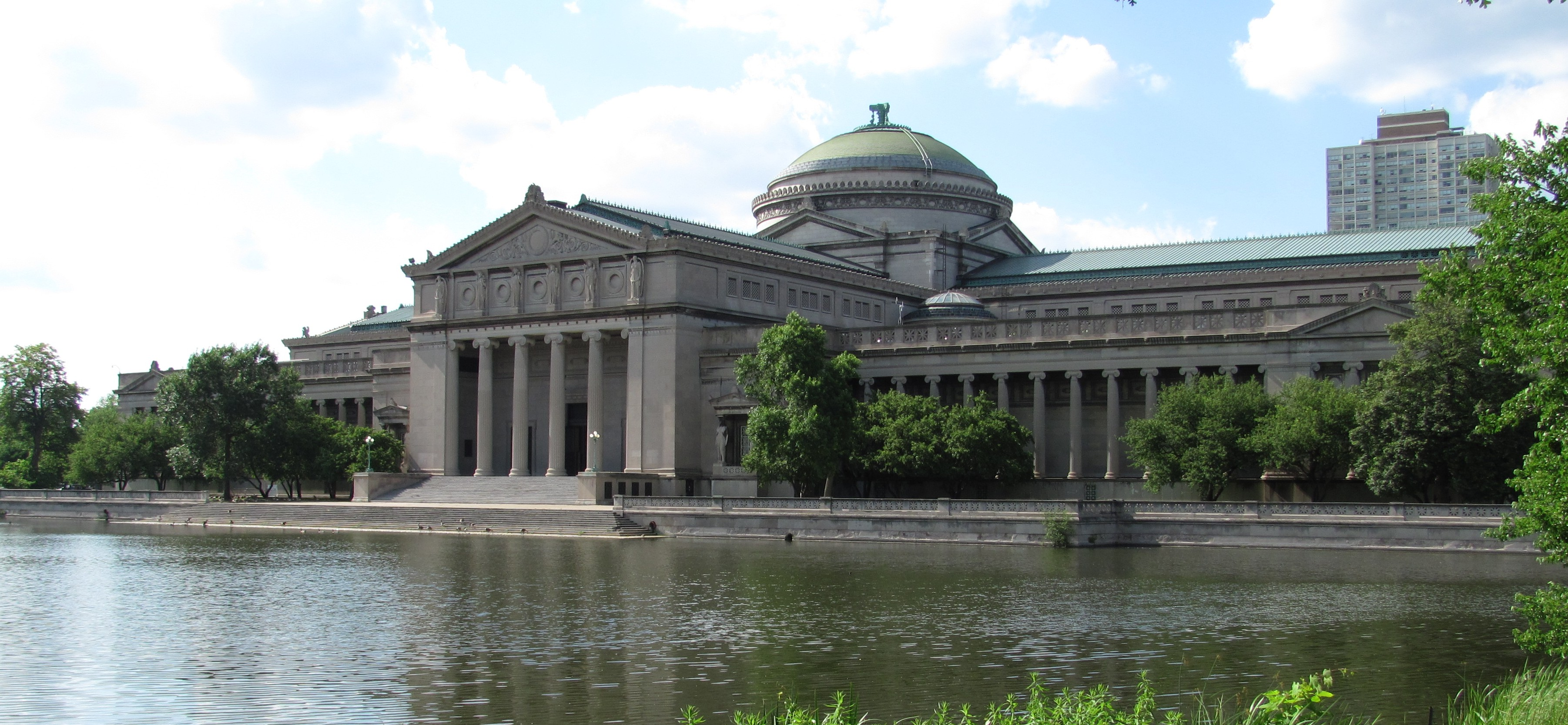
- The Museum of Science and Industry overlooking the Columbia Basin in Jackson Park
- Interactive map of Jackson Park
- Type: Urban park
- Location: South Side, Chicago, United States
- Coordinates: 41°46′58.8″N 87°34′38″W
- Area: 551.5 acres (223.2 ha; 2.232 km^{2})
- Created: 1871–1895
- Operator: Chicago Park District
- Open: 6:00 a.m. to 9:00 p.m.
- Public transit: Metra: at 55th/56th/57th Street, 59th Street/University of Chicago, 63rd Street; South Shore Line: 57th Street, 63rd Street
- Jackson Park Historic Landscape District and Midway Plaisance
- U.S. National Register of Historic Places
- U.S. Historic district
- Architect: Frederick Law Olmsted, Lorado Taft
- NRHP reference No.: 72001565
- Added to NRHP: December 15, 1972

Jackson Park is a 551.5-acre (223.2 ha) urban park on the shore of Lake Michigan on the South Side of Chicago. Straddling the Hyde Park, Woodlawn, and South Shore neighborhoods, the park was designed in 1871 by Frederick Law Olmsted and Calvert Vaux and remodeled in 1893 to serve as the site of the World's Columbian Exposition. It is one of the largest and most historically significant parks in the city, and many of the park's features are mementos of the fair—including the Garden of the Phoenix, the Statue of The Republic, and the Museum of Science and Industry.

The parkland that would become Jackson Park was originally developed as part of an unrealized 1,000-acre (400 ha) addition to the Chicago park and boulevard system, other parts of which include Washington Park and Midway Plaisance. Initially called Lake Park, it was renamed in 1880 in honor of Andrew Jackson, the seventh President of the United States. The aquatic islands and lagoons have since been developed to include boat harbors, playing fields, prairie restoration, a golf course, and three beaches. The park also hosts the Barack Obama Presidential Center and La Rabida Children's Hospital.

== History ==
=== World's Fair ===
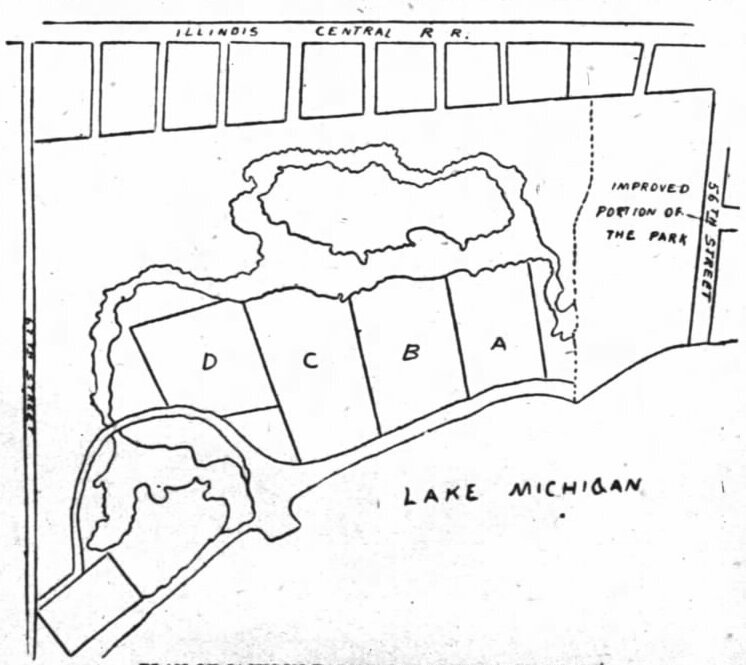
Frederick Law Olmsted's original plan for Jackson Park, 1870

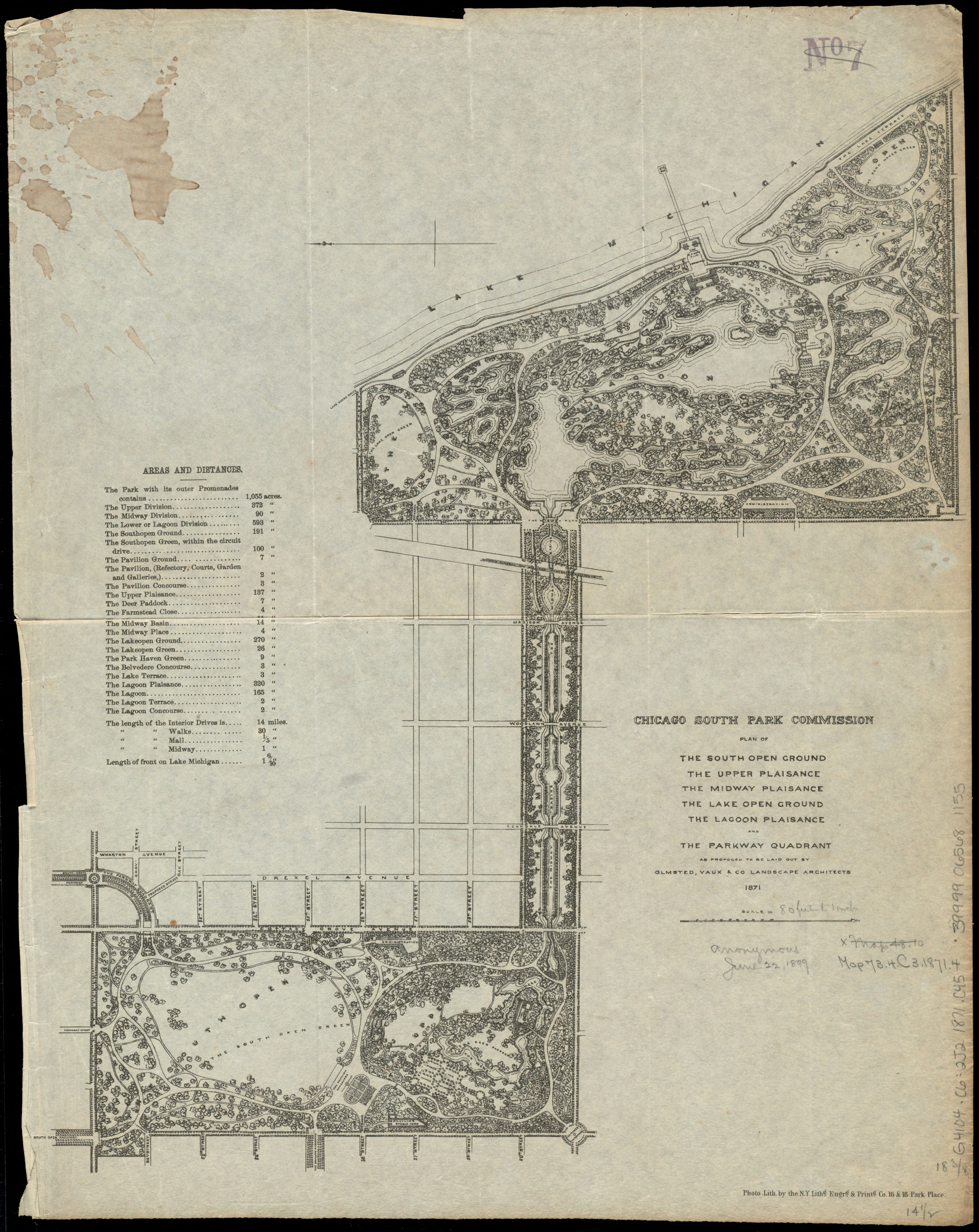
1871 plan for Washington Park, the Midway Plaisance, and Jackson Park –designed by Frederick Law Olmsted and Calvert Vaux

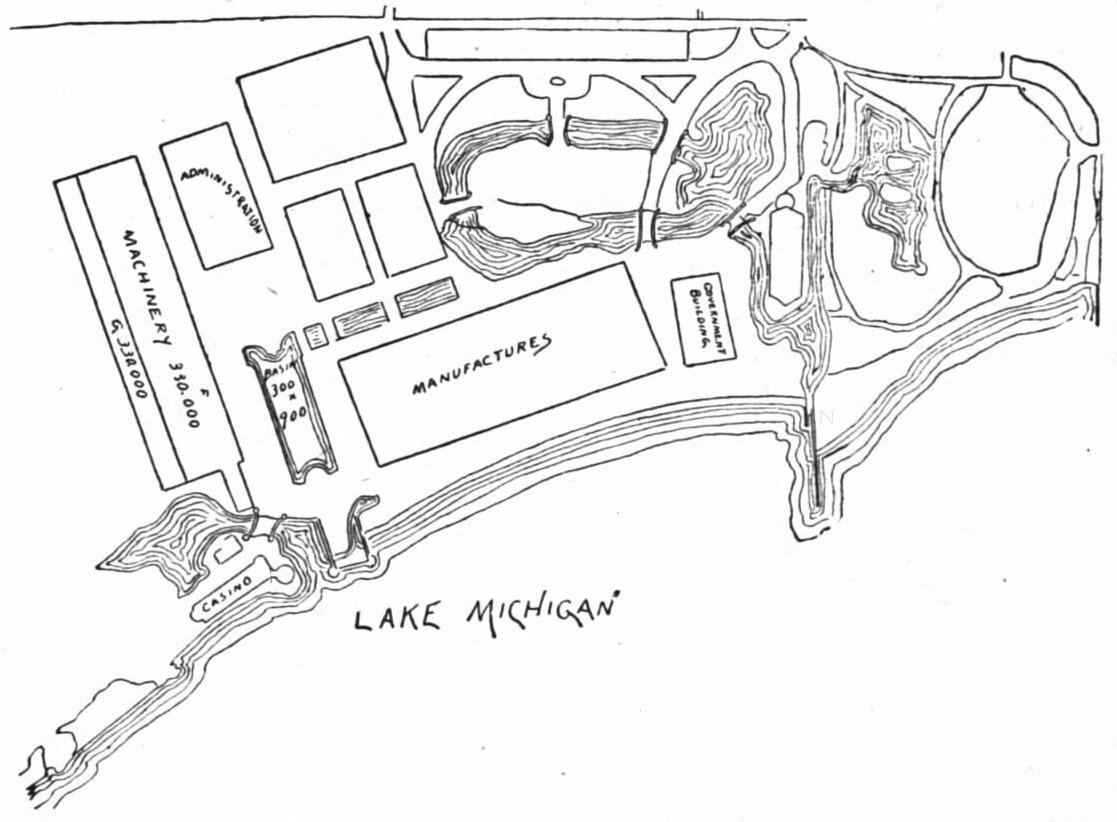
Initial approved site plan for the World's Columbian Exposition, designed in late-1890 by Olmsted, Daniel Burnham, Henry Sargent Codman, and John Wellborn Root

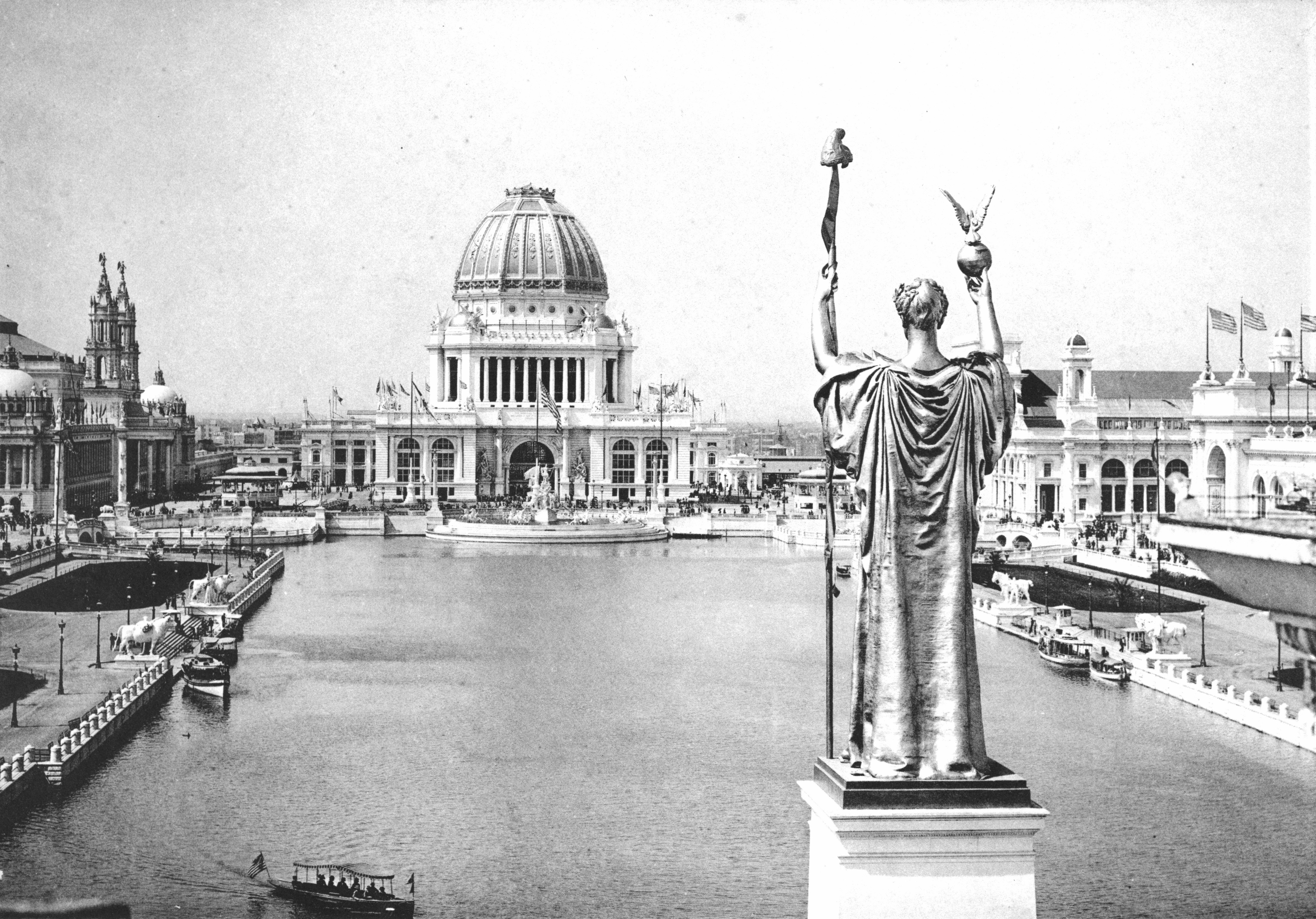
The 1893 World's Fair court of honor and grand basin in Jackson Park

After the state legislature created the South Park Commission in 1869, the designers of New York's Central Park, Frederick Law Olmsted and Calvert Vaux, were hired to lay out the 1,055-acre (4.27 km^{2}) park, which included the Midway Plaisance and Washington Park. Lois Willie explained in her book Forever Open, Clear, and Free, "Olmstead said Jackson Park should be water oriented, with a yacht harbor, winding walkways around the lagoons, small bridges, bathing pavilions, and plenty of space for boating." However, their designs were not put into place at that time, and Jackson Park remained untouched until Chicago was chosen to host the World's Fair several years later. One of the landmarks that recalls the 1893 Columbian Exposition is the Statue of The Republic, only it is now a replica one-third the size of the original The Republic statue. The designers used the Statue of Liberty as inspiration when they were creating the original. Today the 1/3 size statue of The Republic stands at the site of the 1893 Expositions Administration Building.

Known originally as "South Park", the landscape had eastern and western divisions connected by a grand boulevard named the Midway Plaisance. The eastern division became known as "Lake Park"; however, in 1880 the commission asked the public to suggest official names for both the eastern and western divisions. The names "Jackson" and "Washington" were proposed. In the following year, Lake Park was renamed "Jackson Park" to honor Andrew Jackson (1767–1845), the seventh president of the United States.

In 1890, Chicago won the honor of hosting the World's Columbian Exposition. In 1891, Jackson Park was selected as its site. Olmsted and Chicago's architect and planner, Daniel H. Burnham, with his partner John Wellborn Root, laid out the fairgrounds. A team of architects and sculptors created the "White City" of plaster buildings and artworks in Beaux-Arts style. The historic World's Fair opened to visitors on May 1, 1893. It was Root's last project, as he caught pneumonia and died in January 1891, two years before the fair's opening. After most of the fair buildings burned down, the site was transformed back into parkland, as the fair buildings were not designed to be permanent structures.

Jackson Park featured the first public golf course west of the Alleghenies, which opened in 1899. Colonel B. J. D. Irwin, a retired military surgeon and local golfer, sought democratization of recreation in Chicago, and ensured that Jackson Park Golf Course be made open to the public for free, such that "golfers of limited means... can play at almost nominal cost, and cheaper facilities in Chicago would permit of a number enjoying the game who at present are debarred by the dues demanded by the local clubs".

=== Intervening years ===
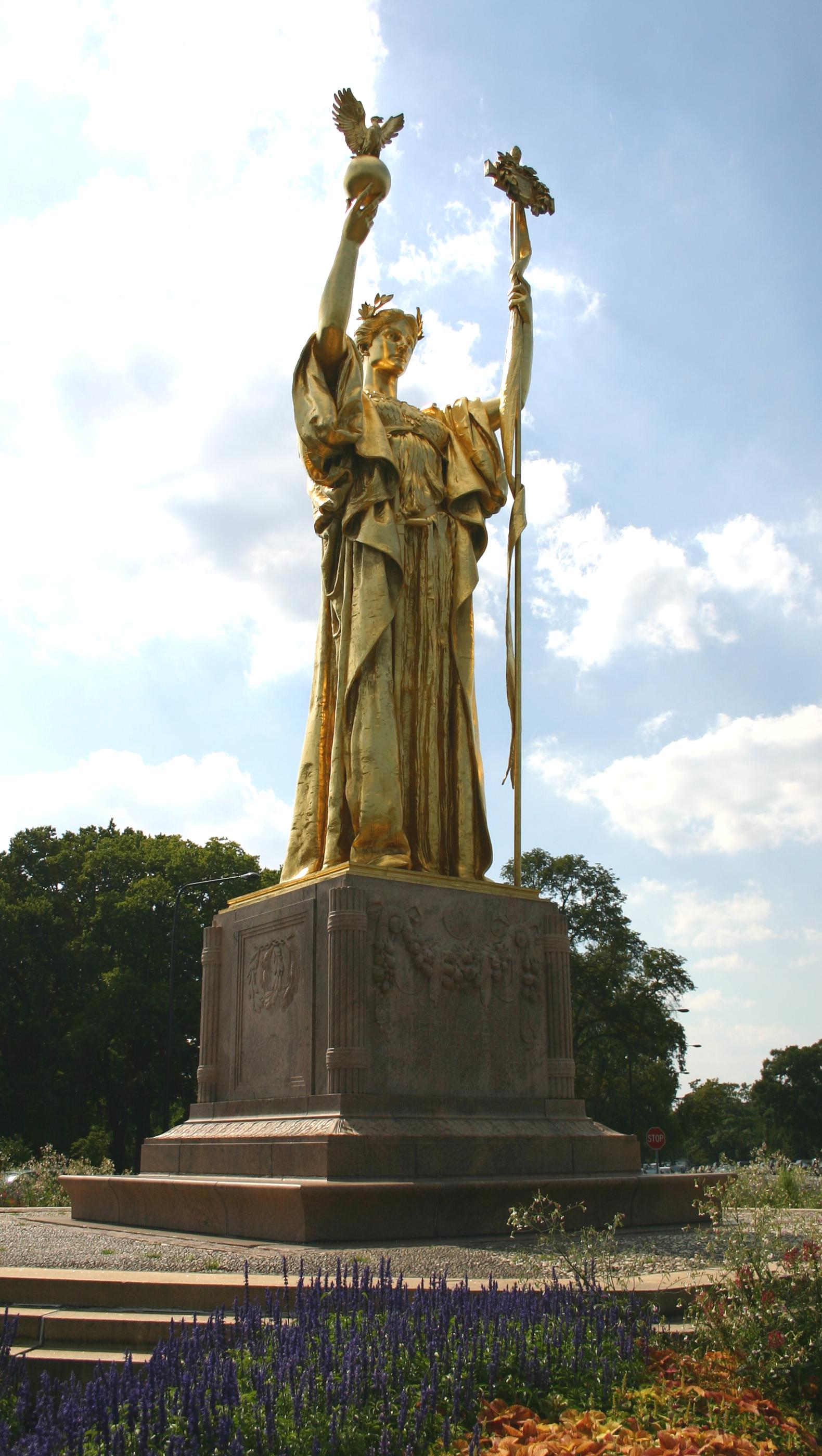
The Statue of The Republic in Jackson Park, a one-third sized replica of Daniel Chester French's The Republic

Most of the park burned to the ground after the fair closed. A headline from January 9. 1894 read, "THE WHITE CITY IN FLAMES; FIRE DESTROYS THE FAIREST OF THE BEAUTIFUL BUILDINGS".

On May 16, 1896, the Jackson Park Yacht Club (JPYC) was organized with incorporation on June 3 but the original organization failed. Rights to the club were purchased and a new JPYC was formed with thirty-eight members with about twenty boats. The Park Commission's aid was sought to dredge and clear a channel through the wreckage of the exposition.

By 1901 membership had expanded to 149 with 105 boats. By 1902, with the club house built of scrap lumber on a purchased scow, the club joined the Lake Michigan Yachting Association. Over the next years, the club grew in membership and in competitive yachts. By 1915, plans were underway for a new club house with sixteen life memberships the core of the funding for the new structure which was dedicated on Memorial Day 1916 by Governor Edward F. Dunne, who arrived on William A. Lydon's 181-foot steam yacht Lydonia.

On July 17, 1916, zoologist and philosopher J. Howard Moore killed himself on Jackson Park's Wooded Island. He regularly visited there to study birds.

The Palace of Fine Arts decayed after the fair until it was reopened as the Museum of Science and Industry in 1933. Sears, Roebuck & Company president Julius Rosenwald donated the initial investment. During World War II, vandals severely damaged the Japanese Garden. The Chicago Park District waited for decades before considering repairing it. Eventually, the city of Osaka donated money for the refurbishment.

During the Cold War, part of Jackson Park contained a Nike Surface-to-Air Missile site and the nearby point was used as its radar station.

In the 1950s, the Wooded Island was almost leased to the Army to become the location of an anti-aircraft installation, but was strongly protested against, as the Park District had given the Army other location options and the Wooded Island was spared.

In 1965, the people of South Chicago were growing tired of the traffic jams on Lake Shore Drive, so the city made plans to widen the road, straighten its curves and run it straight through Jackson Park. Women and children then conducted protests and rallies around tree stumps. The efforts eventually brought results and the city halted roadwork after it had already gone halfway through the park.

In 1972, Jackson Park was placed on the National Register of Historic Places.

The park's East Lagoon, or Music Court Bridge was featured in the 1980 film The Blues Brothers. In the film the titular characters encounter a White Supremacist Nazi demonstration on the bridge and drive their car over the bridge regardless, forcing the Nazis to jump into the water.

=== Rehabilitation ===
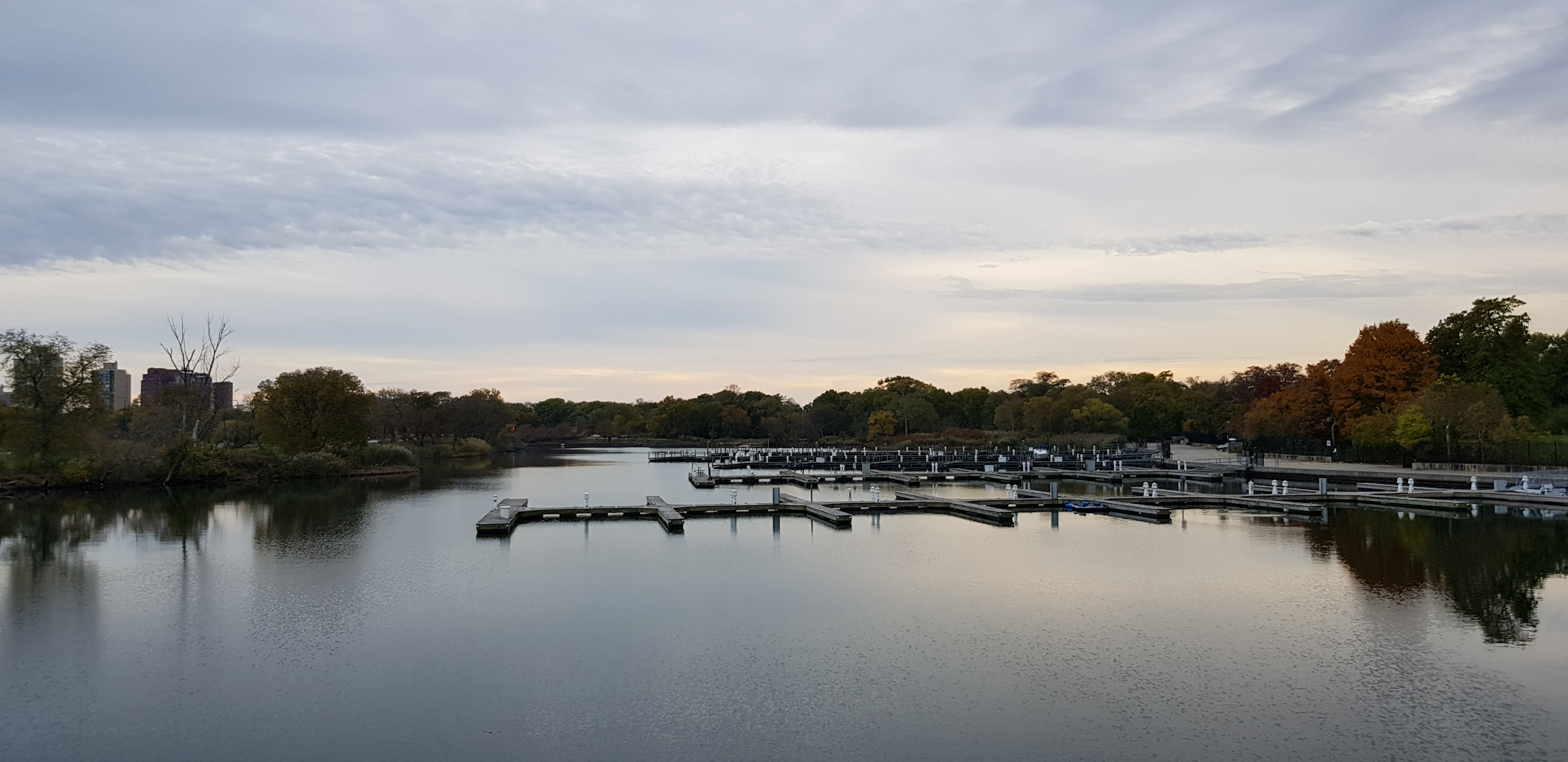
Jackson Park Lagoon

A nonprofit organization called Project 120 began collaborating with the Chicago Park District in 2012 to restore Jackson Park to designer Frederick Law Olmsted's vision. The group's plans include improving the park's green space, creating a music pavilion, and creating a great lawn for park-goers to use for leisure activities. In October 2016 Yoko Ono unveiled a permanent artwork called Sky Landing on the Wooded Island; it is Ono's first permanent art installation in the United States. Ono said she was inspired during a visit to the Garden of the Phoenix in 2013 and that she feels a connection to the city of Chicago.

Jackson Park has a number of volunteers who help maintain the park, but Project 120 aims to go beyond cleanup and plant maintenance. At a cost of about $8.1 million, habitat restoration on Jackson Park's Wooded Island began in 2015 and will continue until 2019. Restoration will take five years to complete and another 25 years reach ecological maturity. The restoration is being done as part of the Army Corps of Engineers Great Lakes Fishery & Ecosystem Restoration (GLFER) program. Improving the park's green space and enhancing its wildlife are meant to improve the appearance and popularity of a park that has been in decline. Some aspects of the restoration, especially plans for a music pavilion, have generated controversy.

== Remaining World's Columbian Exposition structures ==
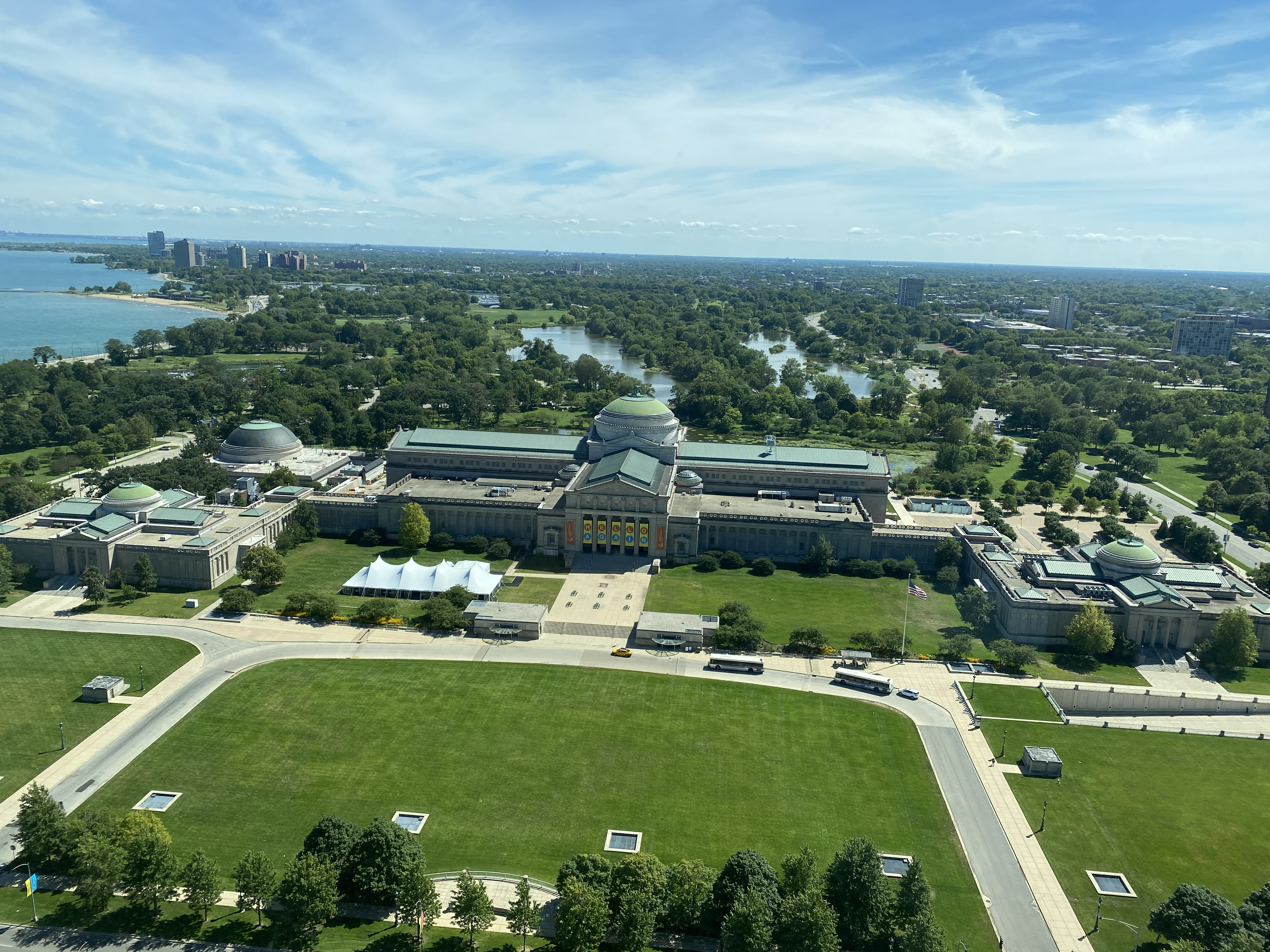
Jackson Park from 1700 East 56th Street with the Museum of Science and Industry in the foreground

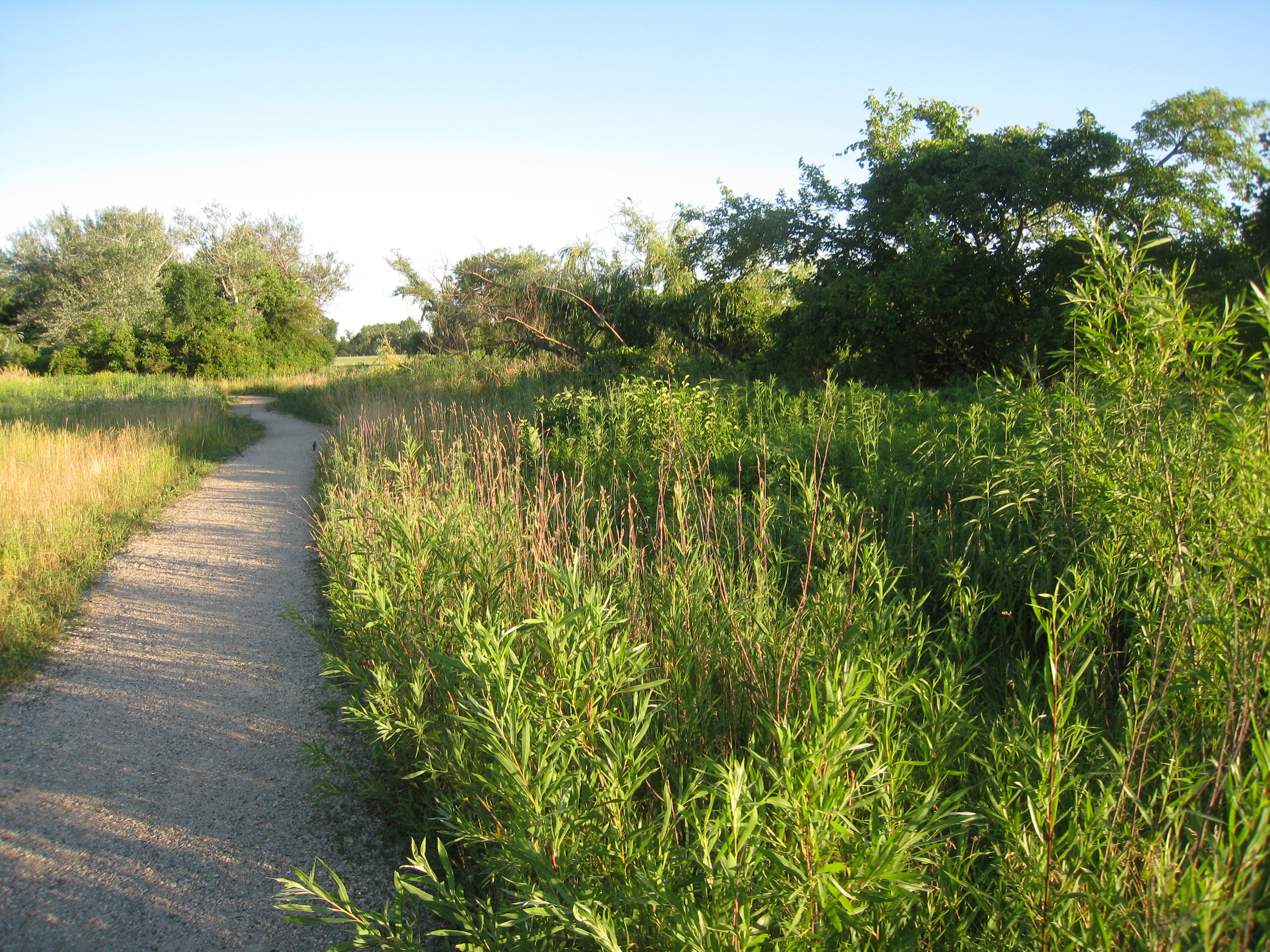
One of several bird trails in Jackson Park

While a comfort station and the North Pond Bridge, both of which date from the 1880s, are still in use, every structure built for World's Columbian Exposition was long ago destroyed by fire, demolished or moved elsewhere, except for the old Palace of Fine Arts, now the Museum of Science and Industry, the only fireproof building at the fair, which fell into disrepair and was rehabilitated with a $5 million grant in 1930 from Julius Rosenwald (President of Sears, Roebuck and Co.). The only other relic from the fair still in the same location is the "Osaka Garden," a Japanese strolling garden. It was reconstructed on its original site on the Wooded Island after being vandalized during World War II. (By itself, the Wooded Island is considered one of "150 great places in Illinois" by the American Institute of Architects.)

The only other significant building that survived the fair is the Norway Pavilion, a building now preserved at a museum called "Little Norway" in Blue Mounds, Wisconsin. "The Viking," a replica of the ancient Viking ship The Gokstad, built at Framnes Shipyard in Sandefjord, Norway in 1892 and sailed across the Atlantic to the fair in 1893, is currently located at Good Templar Park in Geneva, Illinois.

The full-scale replica of Columbus's flagship the Santa María rotted in the Jackson Park Yacht Basin (along Promontory Drive) near La Rabida. In May 1952, what was left of the rotting hulk was dismantled and dredged out of the Yacht Basin.

The Art Institute of Chicago also occupies a building originally constructed for the Exposition, with the intent of housing the museum upon closing of the fair; this Exposition building is the only one not located in Jackson Park. Girders from fair structures were reused in the construction of Dunns Bridge and the Sugar Creek Chapel Bridge.

== Recreational features ==
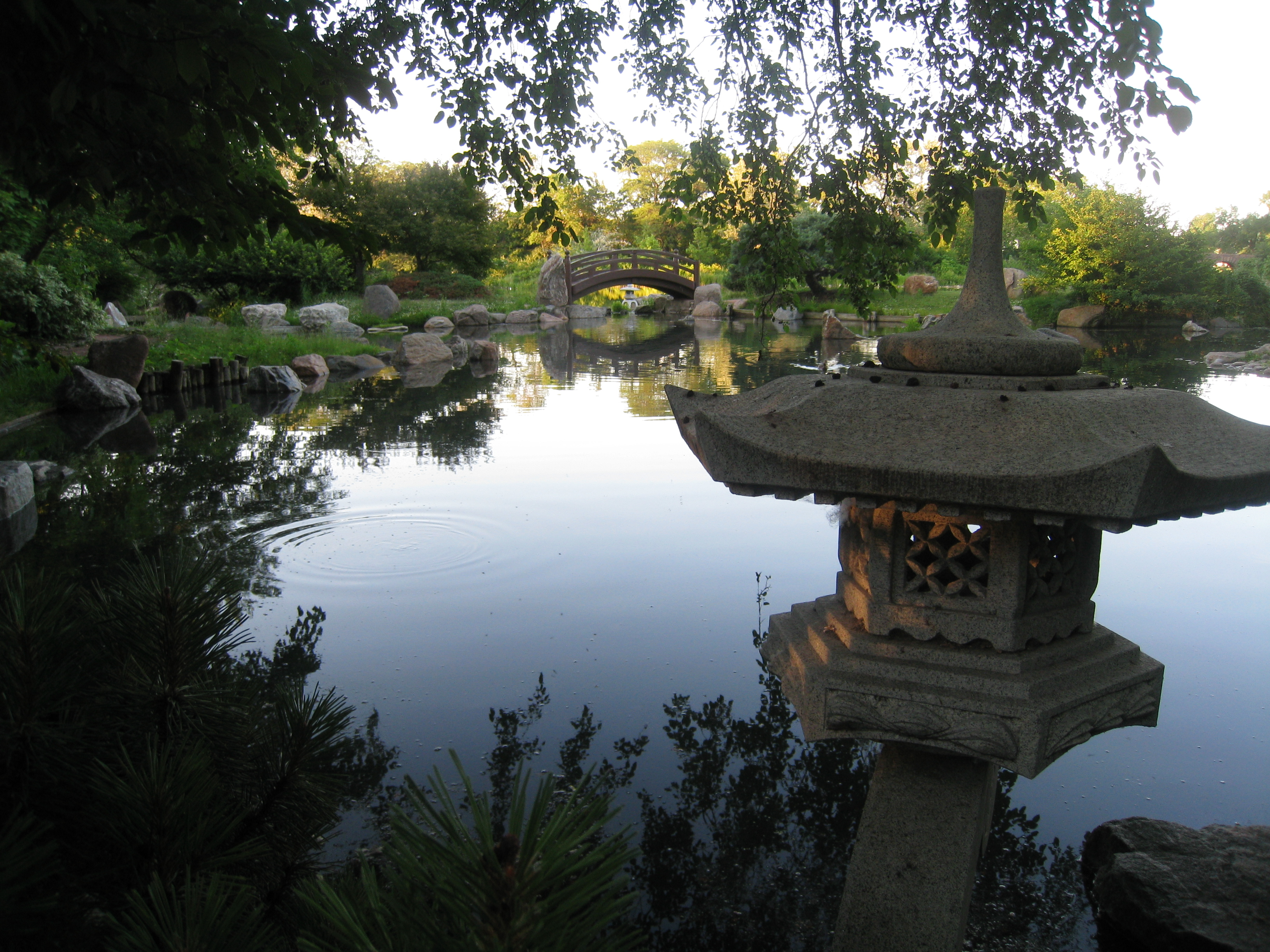
Osaka Garden on Wooded Island

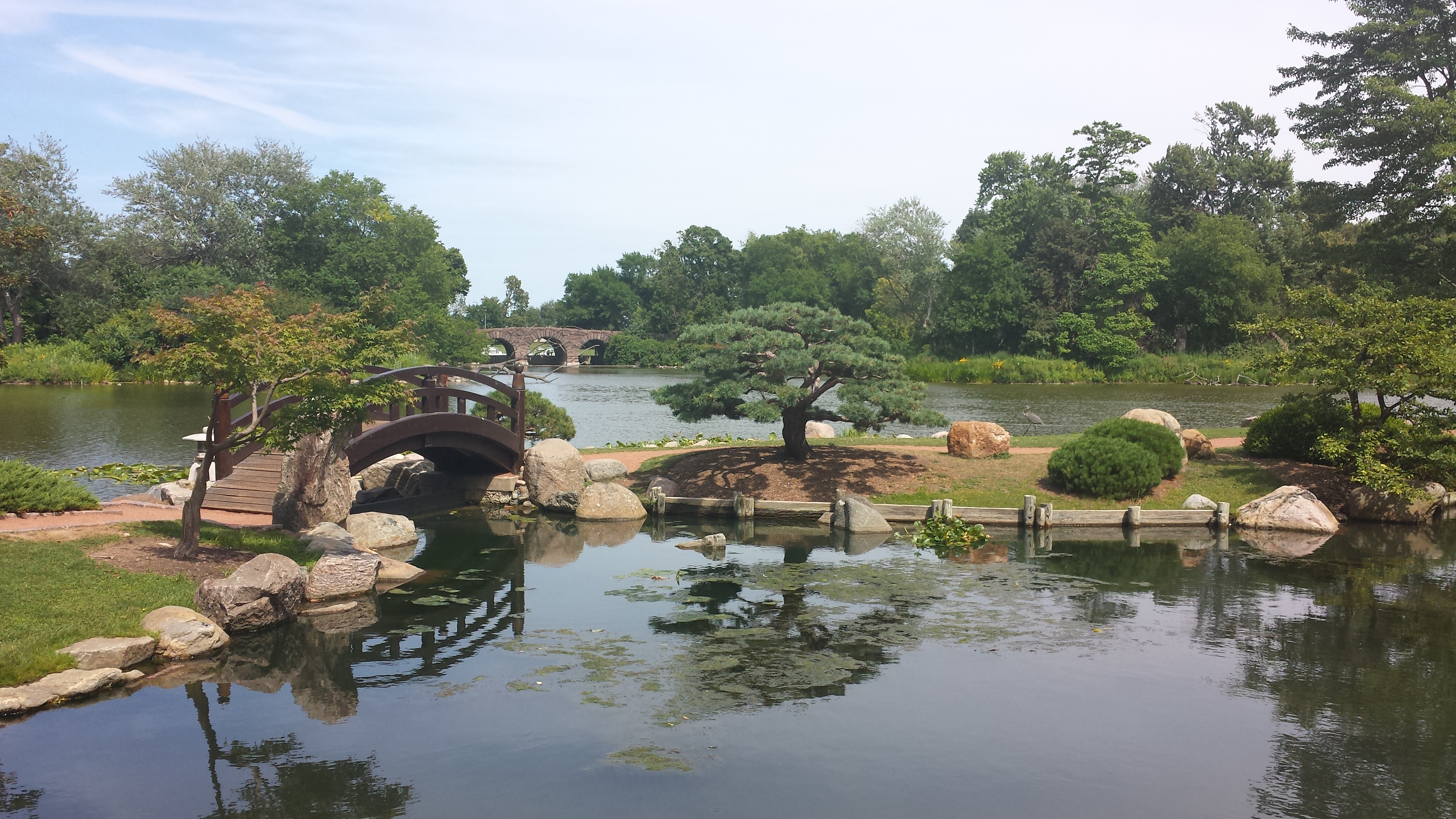
Osaka Garden at Jackson Park

Jackson Park is utilized in many ways. It comprises 542.89 acres (219.70 ha) which include a gymnasium with three multipurpose rooms and a fitness center. Some of Jackson Park's green features consist of a vegetable garden and a flower garden. There are also seasonal sports available, arts and crafts, tennis lessons, piano lessons, after school programs, summer day camps, and holiday themed events.

During the summer season for the Chicago Park District (Memorial Day weekend through Labor Day weekend), the 63rd Street beach and the adjacent Lake Michigan is a destination for beachgoers. The Beach House competes with the South Shore Cultural Center and Promontory Point as South Side beachfront special-use facilities in the Park District. The park also hosts the Chicago Landmark 63rd Street Bathing Pavilion, the 18-hole Jackson Park Golf Course, two walking trails, as well as two basketball courts.

The Lakeside Lawn Bowling Club and the Chicago Croquet Club share two natural grass courts just off Lakeshore Drive and Science Avenue, to the south of the Museum of Science and Industry.

The Jackson Park Golf Course, which opened in 1900, was the first public golf course in the Midwest. It was free until 1920, and in 1925 it was named the world's busiest golf course.

As a result of both a steady decline in the surrounding neighborhood as well as the closing of the lagoons' connection to the 59th Street inner harbor, the lagoons deteriorated. In recent years, the state and city have spent millions of dollars to revitalize the lagoons and Garden of the Phoenix, and to restore the lagoons to their original grandeur. With the recent revitalization projects and the decision by the Illinois Department of Natural Resources to stock them with fish, the lagoons have become a very popular local fishing spot.

== Garden of the Phoenix ==
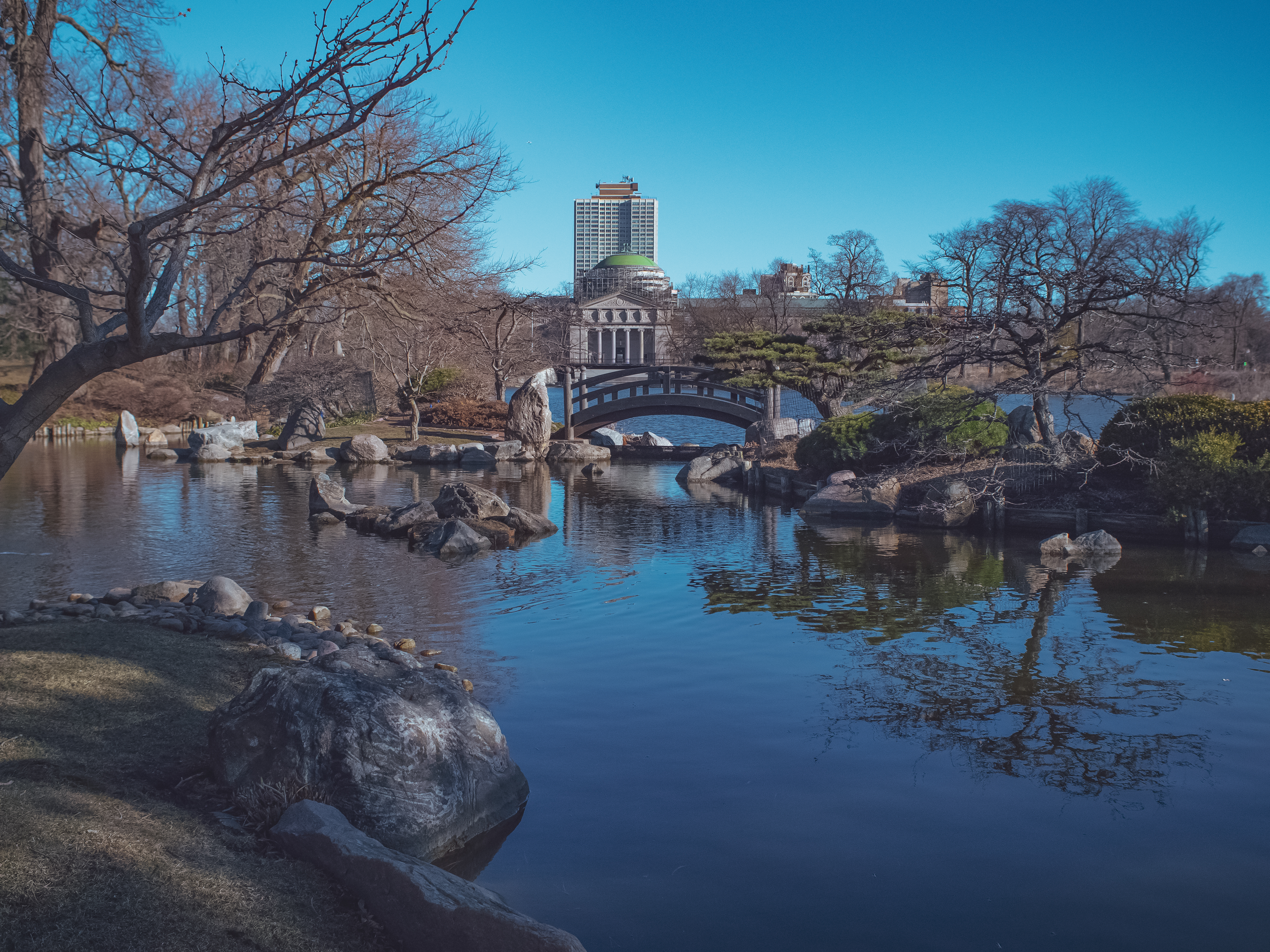
The Garden of the Phoenix and Museum of Science and Industry in Jackson Park

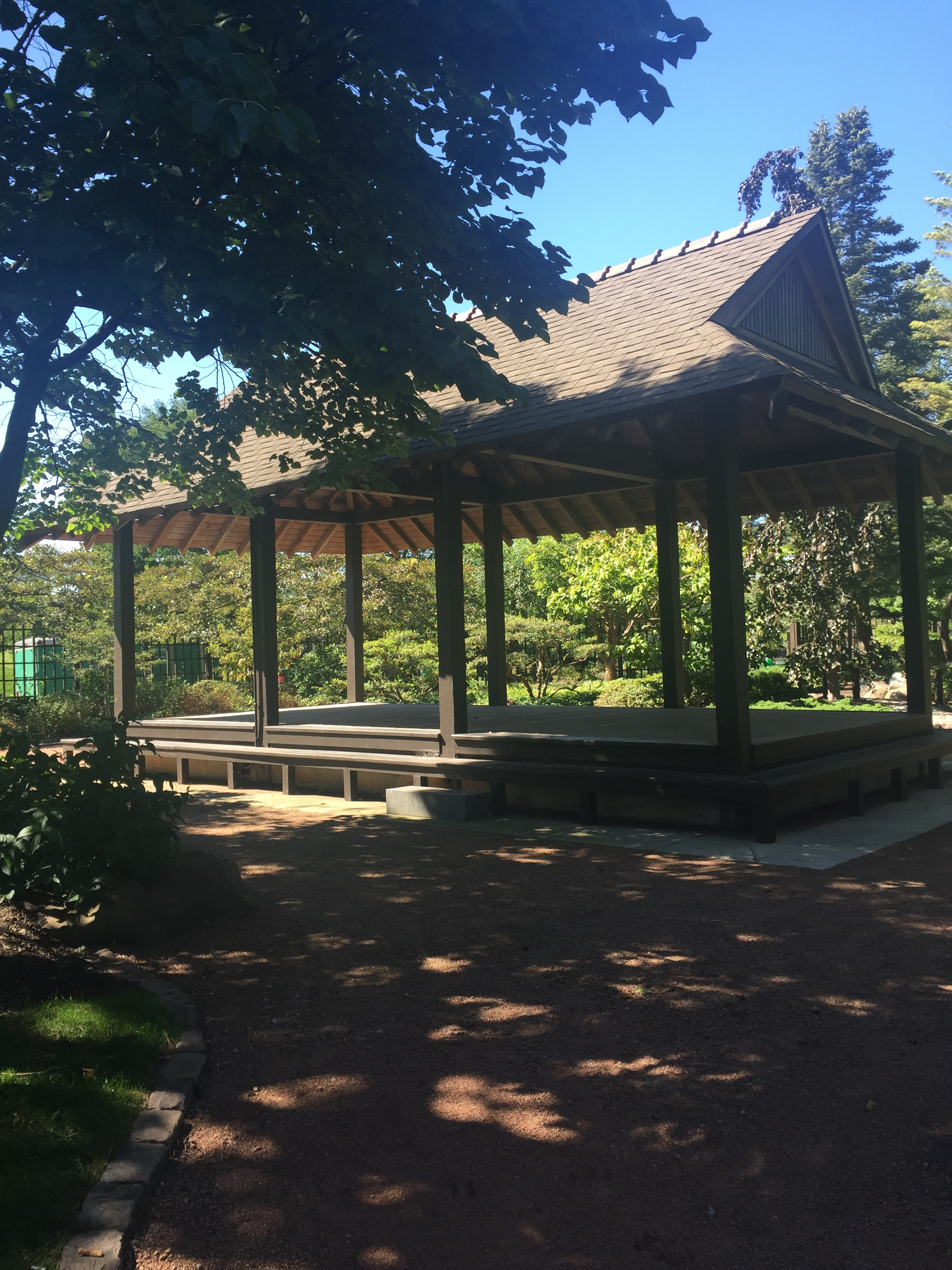
The pavilion at the Garden of the Phoenix

Jackson Park's Japanese gardens were originally created during the 1893 World's Columbian Exposition. The pavilion was based on the Ho-o-Do (Phoenix Hall) of the Byodo-in Temple in Kyoto. The phoenix emblem was a reference to Chicago rising like the mythical firebird from the ashes of the Great Chicago Fire of 1871. The gardens were renamed Osaka Garden in 2013. There is a koi pond within the garden.

== Wildlife ==
Over 300 species of birds have been observed in Jackson Park. This includes a well-studied population of feral monk parakeets, descendants of pet birds that escaped in the 1960s. They are a bird population in much of the south and southwest sides of Chicago, including the University of Chicago campus west of Jackson Park. Over 800 species of animals, plants, and fungi have been observed in Jackson Park. Regular bird walks have been led in the park since the 1970s.

== Connections to other parks ==
Jackson Park is connected by the Midway Plaisance to Washington Park (see Encyclopedia of Chicago Map). In accordance with a canal that Olmsted wanted built between the two parks, a long excavation was made on the Midway, but water has never been allowed in. It is connected to Grant Park by Burnham Park.

The Chicago Lakefront Trail (abbreviated as LFT) is an 18-mile multi-use path in Chicago, Illinois along the shore of Lake Michigan. It is popular with cyclists and joggers. From north to south, it runs through Lincoln Park, Grant Park, Burnham Park and Jackson Park.

Jackson Park also has a dog park called Jackson Bark.

== Site for Barack Obama Presidential Center ==
In 2014, Jackson Park was chosen as a potential site for the Barack Obama Presidential Center. Sonya Malunda from the office of civic engagement of the University of Chicago requested a meeting with Louise Mccurry, president of the Jackson Park Advisory Council, to talk about the library. On July 27, 2016, former president Barack Obama officially selected the park to be the location where his presidential center would be built. He and Michelle Obama both stressed the importance of Chicago's South Side as an influence in their own lives. She said, "One of my greatest honors is being a proud Chicagoan, a daughter of the South Side. I still lead with that descriptor. I wear it boldly and proudly like a crown."

In an unveiling of the presidential center's plans on May 4, 2017, the compound was revealed to incorporate the Jackson Park end of Midway Plaisance from the north (which is to be readapted into a water basin), and a 20 acre parcel of parkland and the park hockey fields to the south, where the main buildings will be predominantly located. As part of a wider plan to reclaim parkland and improve park safety, the project also necessitates the closure of South Cornell Drive between 60th and 67th Streets, a 6-lane park thoroughfare that runs along the western park lagoon and golf course from Midway Plaisance to South Shore, becoming reclaimed green space in the park.

The proposal was controversial and was subjected to challenges which took four years to resolve. Opponents said it would affect the neighborhood, displacing Black residents. Preservationists objected because the park is historic and is listed on the National Register of Historic Places. That issue required a federal review, which was resolved in early 2021. In August 2021 the U.S. Supreme Court rejected a request to block the construction, and ground was broken on September 28, 2021.

The Center was designed by the New York–based firm Tod Williams Billie Tsien Architects. The focal point will be a 235-foot (72 m) museum tower; the center will also include a branch of the Chicago Public Library, a great lawn, a children's play area, and several gardens. It is expected to take four years to complete and cost $830 million.

== See also ==
- Kaneji Domoto
