= Sky Landing =

2016 sculpture by Yoko Ono in Chicago, Illinois, U.S.

- The sculpture in 2026
- Artist: Yoko Ono
- Medium: Steel sculpture
- Location: Chicago, Illinois, U.S.; 41.7863°N 87.5831°W

Sky Landing is a sculpture by Yoko Ono, installed in Chicago, Illinois, United States. Located on Jackson Park's Wooded Island, near the Garden of the Phoenix, the artwork was installed 2016 and marks the artist's first permanent installation in the Americas. Ono attended the dedication. According to WTTW, she created the work "as a gesture of peace, harmony and healing". It features twelve steel lotus petals. WBEZ has said the petals and mounds "form the yin yang symbol to symbolize peace".

== See also ==
- 2016 in art
