= USS Legonia II =

Patrol vessel of the United States Navy

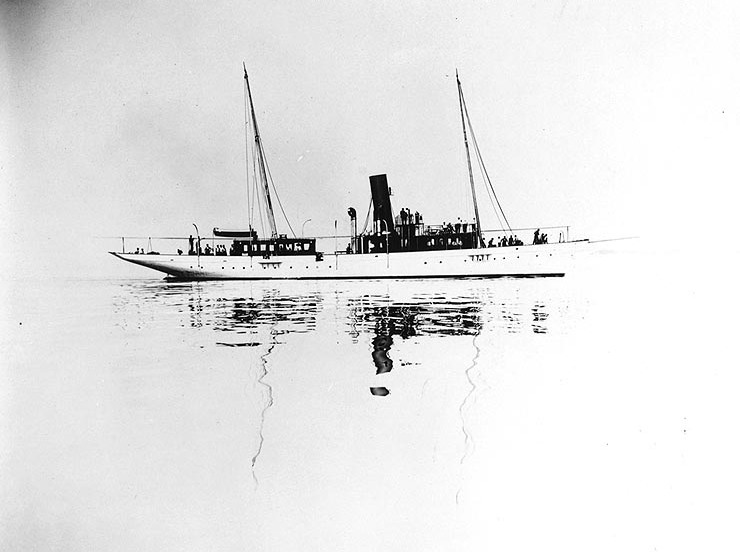
- Legonia II as a private yacht prior to World War I.

History

United States
- Name: USS Legonia II
- Namesake: Lego Point, Harford County, Maryland
- Builder: Pusey & Jones, Wilmington, Delaware
- Yard number: 338
- Completed: 1909
- Acquired: 6 June 1917
- Commissioned: 14 June 1917
- Decommissioned: 1 August 1921
- Home port: Chicago (yacht Lydonia); New York, NY (yacht Walucia)
- Identification: U.S. official #: 206627; Signal: LBFP (yachts)
- Fate: Sold 30 September 1921
- Notes: Operated as private yacht Lydonia, Walucia and Legonia II 1909-1917

General characteristics
- Type: Patrol vessel
- Tonnage: 244 GRT
- Displacement: 119
- Length: 168 ft (51 m) (LOA); 140.4 ft (42.8 m) (Registry)
- Beam: 22 ft 6 in (6.86 m)
- Draft: 9 ft (2.7 m) (mean); 11 ft (3.4 m)
- Depth: 11 ft (3.4 m)
- Propulsion: 1 vertical, triple exapnsin steam engine
- Speed: 13 kn (15 mph; 24 km/h)
- Range: 2,000 nmi (2,300 mi; 3,700 km) @ 12 kn (14 mph; 22 km/h)
- Complement: 20 crew (yacht); 36 Navy
- Armament: 4 × 6-pounder guns; 2 × .30-caliber (7.62-mm) machine guns

USS Legonia II (SP-399) was a private yacht taken into the Navy as United States Navy patrol vessel in commission from 1917 to 1921.

== Yacht ==
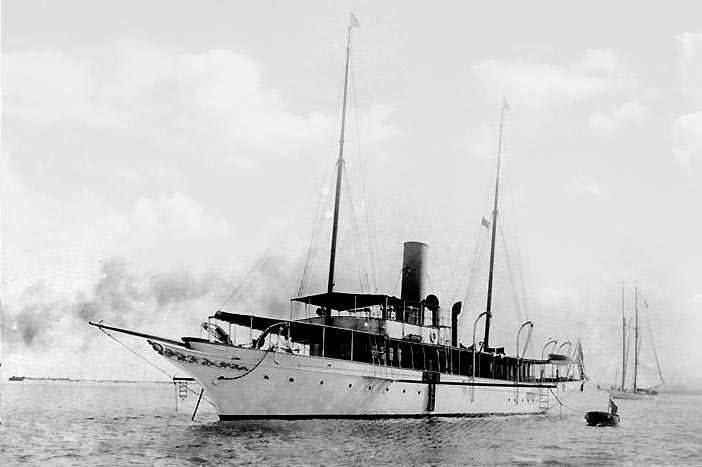
The private yacht Lydonia before being renamed Legonia II, prior to World War I.

Legonia II was built as the private steam yacht Lydonia in 1909 by Pusey & Jones at Wilmington, Delaware, yard hull 338, U.S. official number 206627, for William A. Lydon of Chicago. Lydonia (often seen as Lydonia I) was sold to be replaced by the larger Lydonia II. The first Lydonia was renamed Walucia, then Legonia II.

The yacht Walucia was sold by Henry D. Walbridge of New York to William B. Hurst of Baltimore, Maryland in 1914. Hurst had sold his smaller yacht Legonia and renamed his new yacht Legonia II. The name comes from Hurst's shooting shore on the Chesapeake, Lego Point.

== Navy service ==
On 6 June 1917, the U.S. Navy purchased Legonia II from William B. Hurst for $90,948 to use as a section patrol vessel during World War I. The Navy took delivery of her from Hurst on 9 June 1917, and she was enrolled in the Naval Coast Defense Reserve on 12 June 1917. She was commissioned at Baltimore as USS Legonia II (SP-399) on 14 June 1917.

Assigned to the 5th Naval District, Legonia II was based at Norfolk, Virginia, for the rest of World War I. She served as a messenger and dispatch vessel and as flagship of the Commandant, 5th Naval District, and as flagship made visits to Norfolk; Washington, D.C.; Annapolis, Maryland; and Baltimore. In addition, she served as a harbor and coastal guard ship off Cape Henry, Virginia, patrolled submarine nets, and escorted arriving and departing merchant ships through the defensive sea area of Hampton Roads. After the war ended on 11 November 1918, she remained in service as flagship of the naval district.

Legonia II was decommissioned on 1 August 1921. She was sold to Dr. John M. Masury of Norfolk on 30 September 1921.

== Commercial service ==
Legonia II returned to civilian service registered to Masury remaining in registration under other owners into 1935.
