= Jackson Bark =

Dog park in Chicago, Illinois, United States

Coordinates: 41.7863°N 87.5785°W

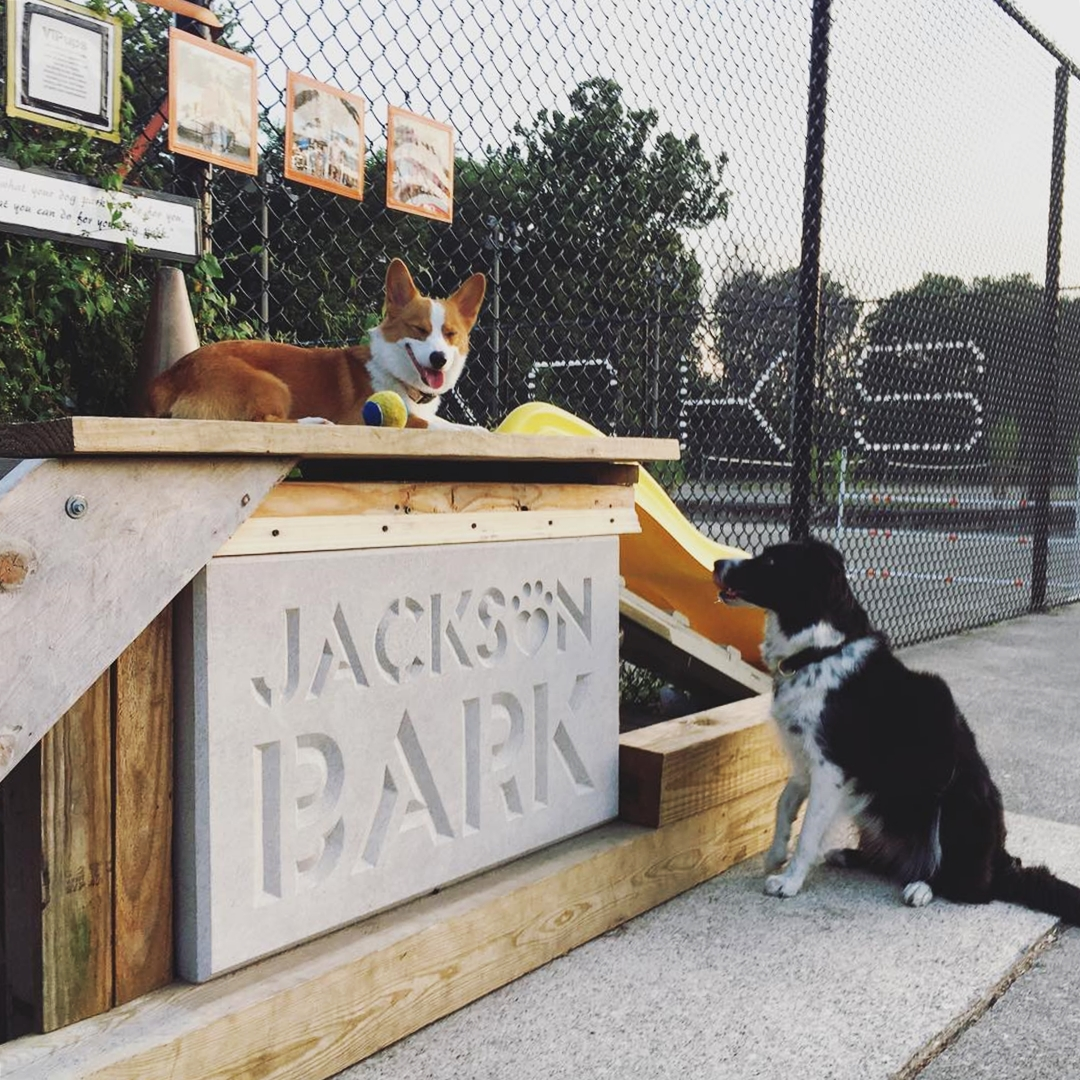
The Jackson Bark stone sign, created by sculptor James Lax, is incorporated into an agility feature with stairs and a slide.

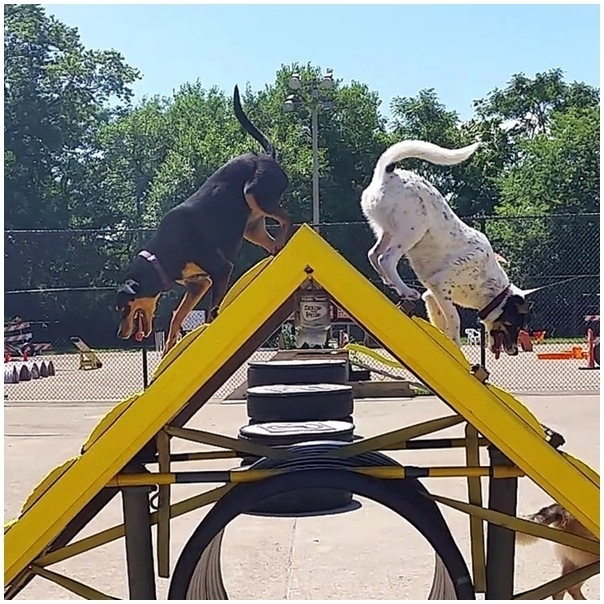
An A-frame and tunnel in the foreground with a Tire-Hill in the background.

Jackson Bark is a dog park located in Jackson Park, Chicago. Developed in the Spring of 2014, the park originally consisted of four tennis courts that were converted into the dog park.

== Accolades ==
Jackson Bark was named one of the best dog parks in the city by the Chicago Reader and the Chicago Tribune.

In 2017, the Chicago Park District endorsed the Tiger Woods Design proposal to expand a golf course in the park to include the Jackson Bark area. As of August 2021, plans for the Tiger Woods Design South Shore Jackson Park Golf Course Restoration included expanding the Jackson Park Driving Range, which would remove Jackson Bark. Originally intended for a 2020 opening, the golf course redesign has faced opposition from environmental groups and community activists. In June 2022, the three fifth Ward precincts voted overwhelmingly in favour of a non-binding referendum which encouraged the city and the Chicago Park District to stop removing trees in Jackson Park.
