= USC&GS Gilbert =

Survey ship of the United States Coast and Geodetic Survey

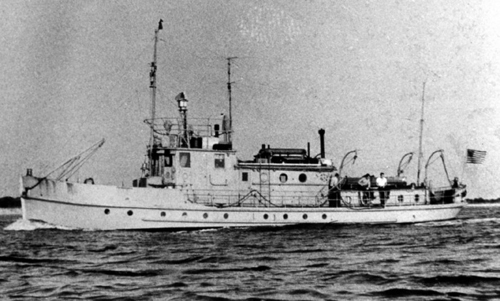
- USC&GS Gilbert

History

United States
- Name: Gilbert
- Namesake: Captain John Jacob Gilbert, (1845-1929), U.S. Coast and Geodetic Survey officer from 1864 to 1921
- Builder: Latham D. Smith, Sturgeon Bay, Wisconsin
- Completed: 1929
- Commissioned: 1930
- Decommissioned: 1962
- Fate: Retired 1962

General characteristics
- Type: Survey launch
- Length: 77.5 ft (23.6 m)
- Beam: 16.5 ft (5.0 m)
- Draft: 7.5 ft (2.3 m)
- Propulsion: Diesel engine

USC&GS Gilbert was a launch that served as a survey ship in the United States Coast and Geodetic Survey from 1930 to 1962.

Gilbert was built by Latham D. Smith at Sturgeon Bay, Wisconsin, in 1929. She entered Coast and Geodetic Survey service in 1930 and spent her career on the United States East Coast.

On 23 August 1933, Gilbert was with the Coast and Geodetic Survey survey ships USC&GS Oceanographer (OSS-26) and USC&GS Lydonia (CS 302) at Norfolk, Virginia, when the 1933 Chesapeake–Potomac hurricane struck. The three ships handled considerable radio traffic for the Norfolk area, including U.S. Navy traffic, during the storm.

Gilbert was retired from Coast and Geodetic Survey service in 1962.

Gilbert Canyon, an undersea canyon in the Atlantic Ocean off the Gulf of Maine on the slope of the Georges Bank, is named for USC&GS Gilbert.
