= USS Oceanographer (AGS-3) =

Survey ship of the United States Navy

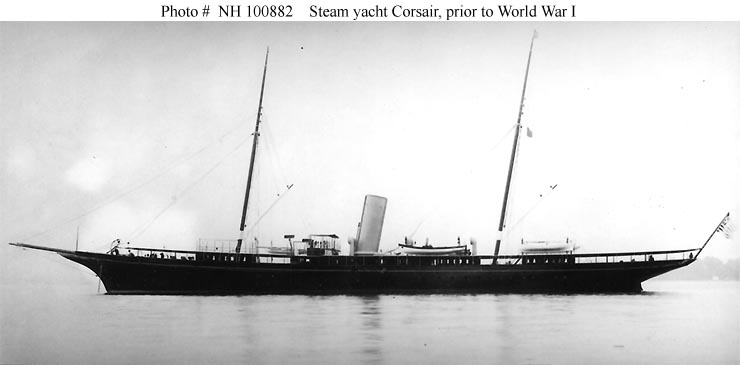
- Corsair III (American Steam Yacht, 1898) before her World War I Naval service. Built in 1898 for financier J.P. Morgan, this yacht served as USS Corsair (SP-159) during World War I and as USS Oceanographer (AGS-3) during World War II

History

United States
- Name: Corsair (1898–1917); USS Corsair (SP-159)
- Builder: T. S. Marvel Shipbuilding, Newburgh, New York
- Launched: December 1898
- Christened: Miss Louise Morgan
- Acquired: 15 May 1917
- Commissioned: 15 May 1917
- Decommissioned: 9 June 1919
- Stricken: 9 June 1919

United States
- Name: USC&GS Oceanographer (OSS-26)
- Operator: United States Coast and Geodetic Survey
- Acquired: 2 January 1930
- Fate: Transferred to U.S. Navy 7 April 1942

United States
- Name: USS Oceanographer (AGS-3)
- Namesake: Oceanographer, a scientist in the field of oceanography, the study of the world's oceans
- Acquired: 7 April 1942
- Commissioned: 15 August 1942
- Decommissioned: 22 September 1944
- Stricken: 14 October 1944
- Fate: Scrapped

General characteristics as Corsair (SP-159):
- Type: patrol yacht
- Tonnage: 1,136 grt
- Length: 304 ft (93 m)
- Beam: 33 ft 4 in (10.16 m)
- Draft: 16 ft (4.9 m)
- Speed: 19 knots (35 km/h; 22 mph)
- Armament: 4 × 3"/50 caliber gun mounts

General characteristics as Oceanographer (AGS-3):
- Type: Survey ship
- Displacement: 1,963 t.
- Length: 293 ft (89 m)
- Beam: 33 ft (10 m)
- Draft: 17 ft (5.2 m)
- Speed: 14.7 knots (27.2 km/h; 16.9 mph)
- Complement: 146
- Armament: 2 × 3 in (76 mm)/50 caliber gun mounts

USS Oceanographer (AGS-3) was a survey ship of the United States Navy during World War II that produced charts chiefly of passages in the Solomon Islands area of the Pacific Ocean. Upon transfer to the Navy, she had initially been briefly named and classed as gunboat USS Natchez (PG-85). Before her World War II Navy service, she had been USC&GS Oceanographer (OSS-26), a survey ship with the United States Coast and Geodetic Survey from 1930.

From her launch in 1898 to 1930, she had been Corsair III, a private steam yacht of American industrialist J. P. Morgan, except for a brief period during World War I. During that conflict, the United States Navy chartered her as the patrol vessel USS Corsair (SP-159). She accompanied the American Expeditionary Force to France in 1917 and patrolled off the west coast of that country.

After repairs were completed in June 1944, Oceanographer was, following further inspection, decommissioned in September and broken up for scrap.

== Morgan yacht ==
Corsair III, designed by John Beavor-Webb, was built in 1898 by T. S. Marvel Shipbuilding, Newburgh, New York, christened by the daughter of the owner, Miss. Louisa Morgan, and her hull was launched in December 1898. Her triple expansion steam engines were fitted by W. & A. Fletcher Co. of Hoboken, New Jersey after launch. J. P. Morgan died in 1913, and his son J. P. Morgan Jr. inherited the yacht.

== World War I ==
Corsair was chartered by the Navy 15 May 1917; commissioned the same day and reported to the Atlantic Fleet.

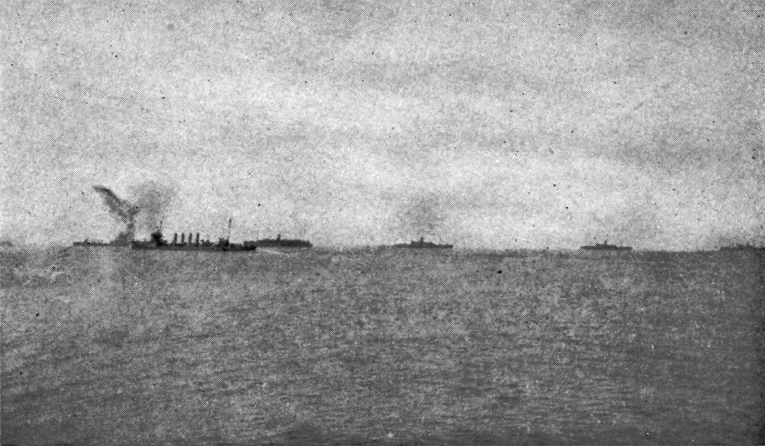
With America's first convoy. The troop ships are the Henderson, Antilles, Momus and Lenape.

Corsair sailed from New York on 14 June 1917 with the first contingent of the American Expeditionary Force to France, arriving at Saint-Nazaire on 27 June. On 2 July, she stood out to join the U.S. Patrol Squadrons operating against enemy submarines and performing escort and patrol duties off the west coast of France. She crossed the war zone many times on convoy escort and rescued survivors of torpedoed vessels. On 17 October 1917, she assisted the torpedoed United States Army transport Antilles, picked up many of her survivors, and searched for the submarine which had attacked her. On 22 June 1918, she rescued the survivors of Navy cargo ship Californian, which had struck a mine, and, adding to her outstanding rescue record, between 12 and 14 September, towed the disabled Norwegian steamer Dagfin into Verdon.

Corsair cleared Brest 18 November 1918, for operations in British waters, calling at Rosyth, Scotland, and Queenstown, Ireland, serving from time to time as flagship for Commander, U.S. Naval Forces in European Waters. She put in at Plymouth 7 May 1919 to embark Secretary of the Navy Josephus Daniels and his staff for transportation to Brest, sailing with them 8 May and arriving the same day. The dignitaries disembarked 9 May, and Corsair sailed the next day for New York by way of the Azores and Bermuda, arriving 28 May. Corsair was returned to her owner on 9 June 1919, once again becoming the private yacht Corsair III.

== United States Coast and Geodetic Survey career ==
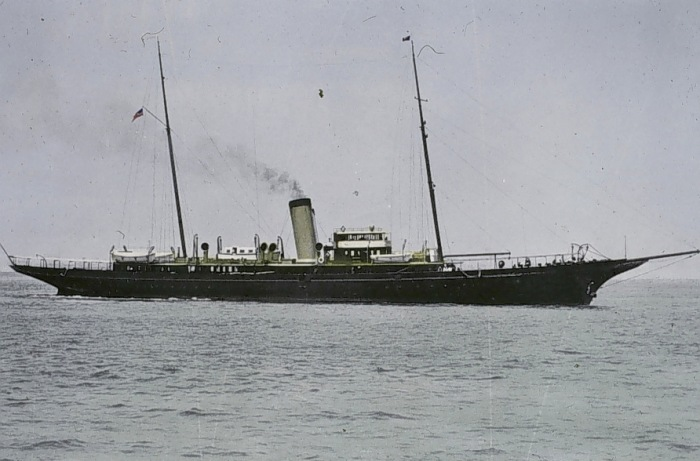
USC&GS Oceanographer

On 2 January 1930, the United States Coast and Geodetic Survey acquired Corsair III as a donation from J. P. Morgan, Jr. with the stipulation that the ship be used for Coast and Geodetic Survey work. (Note: C&GS references use the name Corsair II yet show a build date consistent with the third ship of that name rather than the earlier (1891) vessel.) At the time of the donation, J. P. Morgan, Jr. was having Corsair IV built with launch at Bath Iron Works on 10 April 1930.

Classified as an "ocean survey ship" and renamed USC&GS Oceanographer (OSS-26), the vessel operated along the United States East Coast during her career with the Survey. Her first survey was of the coastline east of Pensacola, Florida, followed by movement to northern waters in May 1930 for summer work on the Georges Bank. On 3 September 1930, she ran aground on the Lobster Rocks at Islesboro, Maine, but she was refloated and repaired and returned to service.

Oceanographer conducted many offshore surveys and discovered many of the canyons incising the continental slope between the Georges Bank area and Cape Hatteras, North Carolina. She also supported the study of geophysics when Maurice Ewing conducted his first seismic reflection profiling experiments from her in 1935.

On 23 August 1933, Oceanographer and the Coast and Geodetic Survey steamers USC&GS Lydonia and USC&GS Gilbert handled considerable radio traffic for Norfolk, Virginia, during the 1933 Chesapeake–Potomac hurricane, which struck the city on that date and set records for high water levels. Oceanographer's commanding officer, H.A. Seran, reported that the ship's radio plant was for a time during the height of the hurricane the only means of communication from Norfolk to points outside; during this time, Oceanographer handled all radio traffic for the U.S. Navy, as well as for commercial companies.

In January 1937, crewmembers of Oceanographer and Lydonia were detached to man Coast and Geodetic Survey launches under the direction of the Red Cross during flood relief efforts at Kenova, West Virginia.

On 7 April 1942, Oceanographer was transferred to the U.S. Navy at Norfolk for World War II service

== World War II ==
Oceanographer was acquired by the Navy from the Coast and Geodetic Survey at Norfolk, Virginia, on 7 April 1942 for World War II service in the inshore patrol in the Fifth Naval District, briefly renamed Natchez (PG-85); renamed Oceanographer (AGS-3); rerigged and outfitted at Norfolk Shipbuilding and Drydock Co. for survey duty; and commissioned 15 August. Work was completed on 28 August, and Comdr. Henry B. Campbell, USCGS, assumed command, with Lt. Comdr. Myron W. Graybill, USN, as Executive Officer.

After shakedown in the Chesapeake, Oceanographer steamed for New York 3 October to join a convoy en route to Cristóbal, Canal Zone. She transited the Canal, and at San Pedro, California, reported for duty to CINCPAC. Upon completion of repairs at San Pedro, she got underway for Seattle. She encountered a severe storm off Astoria, Oregon, necessitating further repairs at Winslow Marine Railway Co., Bainbridge Island, Washington. Proceeding to Kodiak via the Inside Passage, she reported to the Alaskan Command with no sound or radar gear, a very short cruising radius, and limited potable water capabilities, considered generally unsuitable for Aleutian duty.

Oceanographer returned to Seattle on 25 December 1942 for additional repairs. After towing an aircraft transportation lighter from Seattle to San Francisco, she was assigned to the Matson Navigation Co. for repairs. Comdr. Graybill assumed command on 2 March 1943, and the following day, Oceanographer got underway for Pearl Harbor, where sound gear was installed, and necessary alterations were made.

The survey ship departed Pearl Harbor escorting several LSTs and plotted a course for Nouméa, New Caledonia. As her first war zone assignment, she surveyed Havannah Passage, New Caledonia. Upon completion of the Havannah Passage, the ship made three other surveys in the vicinity of Nouméa, erecting numerous beacons and planting many buoys. On 1 November, she proceeded to Guadalcanal via Espiritu Santo to produce charts of that island's northern coast. She also surveyed Munda Bar and neighboring anchorages at Munda, New Georgia, British Solomon Islands. At various times, submarine chasers and APCs assisted in the surveys and dispatched triangulation parties to islands in the vicinity.

During her sixteen months in the South Pacific, Oceanographer produced fifteen charts, each requiring from one to three million soundings. Much of the compiled data was the first of its kind in the area, and it contributed greatly to the success of many amphibious operations.

Ordered to Pearl Harbor 3 June 1944 for badly needed repairs, she was sent on to San Pedro, California 27 June. Upon completion of the arrival inspection, it was decided to decommission and scrap her. Oceanographer decommissioned 22 September, was struck from the Navy Vessel Register 14 October, and, in accordance with the agreement executed with J. P. Morgan, Jr., broken up for scrap.

== Commemoration ==
In recognition of her survey work off the U.S. East Coast, the underwater features Oceanographer Canyon (a canyon in the Atlantic Ocean off the Gulf of Maine on the slope of the Georges Bank) and Corsair Canyon – the latter name derived from her name as a World War I U.S. Navy patrol vessel and private yacht before her Coast and Geodetic Survey career – are named for Oceanographer.

== Awards ==
- Victory Medal
- American Campaign Medal
- Asiatic-Pacific Campaign Medal
- World War II Victory Medal
