= William A. Lydon =

American businessman (1863-1918)

William A. Lydon (November 9, 1863 – October 28, 1918), with Fred C. Drews, founded the Great Lakes Dredge and Dock Company in Chicago in 1890. He died on October 28, 1918, in Chicago, Illinois.

He was Commodore of the Chicago Yacht Club, building in 1909 the 244 ton Lydonia and in 1911 contracting again with Pusey and Jones, Wilmington, Delaware, for the second, 497-ton yacht Lydonia II, described as the finest yacht on the Great Lakes, acquired by the Navy 21 August 1917 and commissioned as the USS Lydonia (SP-700).
