= Osaka Garden =

Japanese garden inside Jackson Park in Chicago, Illinois, US

Osaka Garden in Jackson Park
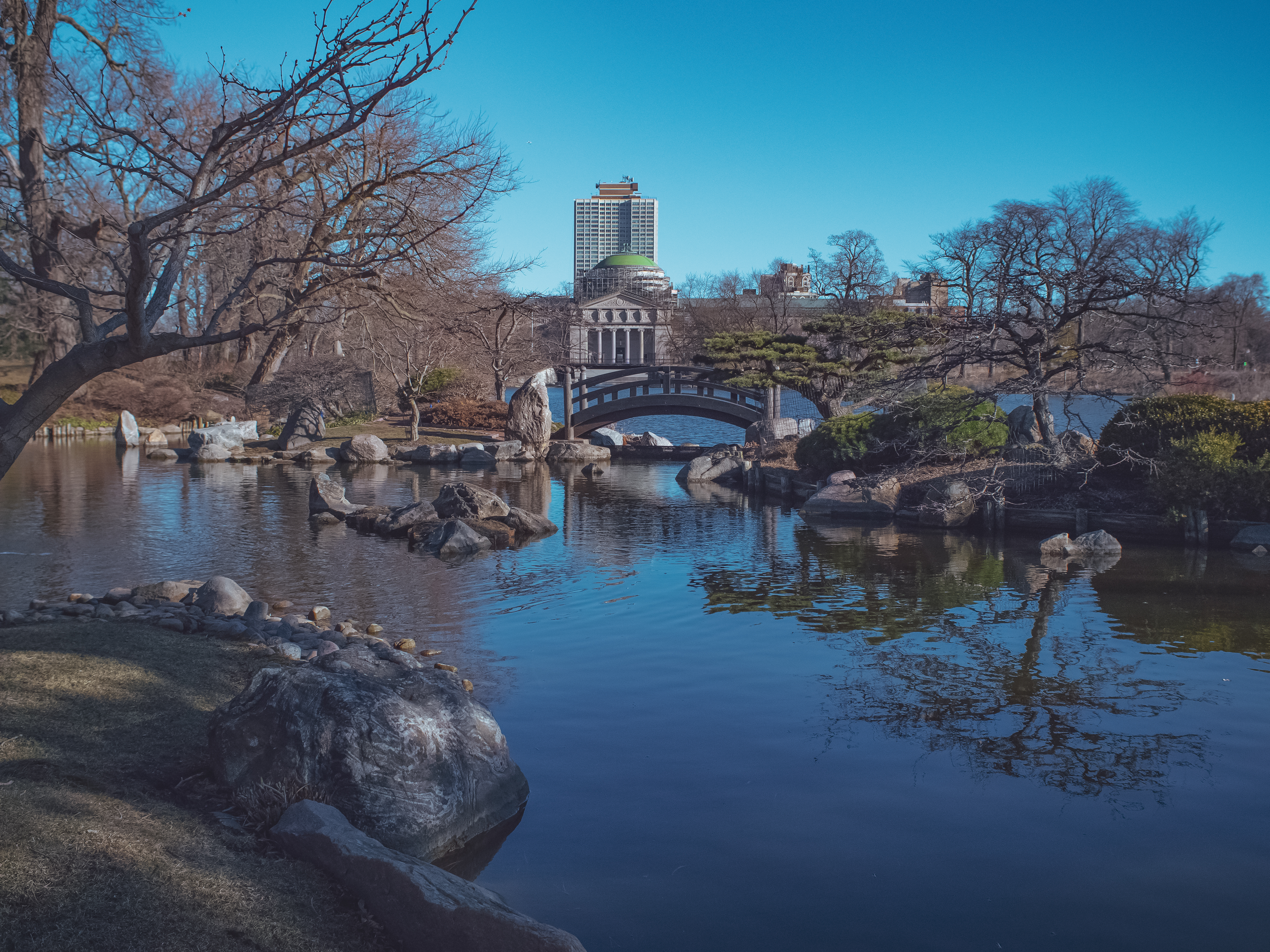
- Osaka Garden in Chicago's Jackson Park, with a view of the Museum of Science and Industry
- Interactive map of Osaka Garden in Jackson Park
- Type: Japanese garden
- Location: Jackson Park, South Side, Chicago, United States
- Coordinates: 41.7864°N 87.5828°W
- Created: 1893; 133 years ago
- Operator: Chicago Park District

Osaka Garden is a Japanese garden on the grounds of Jackson Park in Chicago, Illinois, United States. Originally established as a gift from Japan for the 1893 World's Columbian Exposition, it is named after Osaka —one of Chicago's sister cities— and is visible from the top floor of the Obama Presidential Center.

== History ==
Jackson Park's Osaka Garden was established on March 31, 1893, when the Ho-O-Den (鳳凰殿 "Phoenix Pavilion") was dedicated on the north end of the Wooded Island for the 1893 World's Columbian Exposition. The design of the pavilion was based on the Hō-ō-dō (鳳凰堂 "Phoenix Hall") of the Byōdō Temple (平等院) in Uji, Japan.

The phoenix emblem was a reference to Chicago rising like the mythical firebird from the ashes of the Great Chicago Fire of 1871. After the 1893 Fair, most of the Fair structures were burned or torn down, but the garden and the Phoenix Pavilion remained intact.

In 1933 the government of Japan constructed a traditional tea house at the Century of Progress World's Fair and also created a garden on Wooded Island's northeast side and refurbished the Ho-O Den. After WWII the pavilion and tea house were destroyed by fire and the garden was abandoned. After the city of Osaka became one of Chicago's sister cities, one the goals of the Sister Cities program became to revive the Japanese Garden in Jackson Park. With the collective efforts of the City of Osaka and the Chicago Park District, the gardens were restored and named "Osaka Garden" in 1993 in honor of that city's help and friendship.

In 2012 and 2013, over 170 cherry trees were planted by the Chicago Park District with support from the Garden of the Phoenix Foundation and the Japanese Chamber of Commerce and Industry of Chicago (JCCC シカゴ日本商工会議所). The trees were planted to commemorate JCCC’s 50th anniversary and the 120th anniversary of the gift of the Ho-o-den (Phoenix Pavilion) by the Japanese government to the City of Chicago following the 1893 World's Columbian Exposition. The sakura trees first bloomed in 2019. Each spring, the cherry blossoms enter a peak bloom period of 6 to 10 days in late April or early May. In 2023, a spring thunderstorm damaged most of the blossoms shortly after initial bloom. In 2024 erratic weather and fluctuation of temperatures caused many buds not to fully bloom.

The number of cherry trees at Jackson Park has been growing; by 2026, the park district expects to have nearly 250 trees in the cherry blossom tree grove. In 2024, 60 cherry trees were planted on the Wooded Island around the Japanese Garden, and near the Columbia Basin to mark the 60th anniversary of the Japanese Chamber of Commerce and Industry of Chicago.

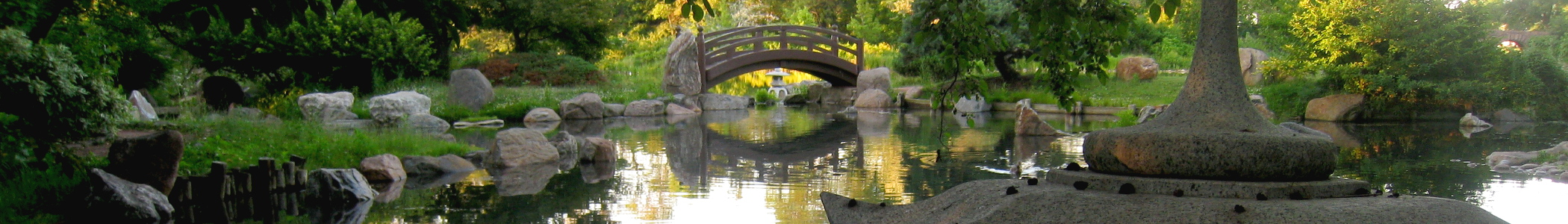
Panorama of the garden

== Description ==
There is a koi pond within the garden. The stones within the park carry an old legend which says they are laid in a zigzag because evil spirits can only move in a straight line, so if you cross the stones, any evil spirits will just fall into the water.

The Kasuga Lantern is one of the lamps that survived from 1893. It takes its name from the Kasuga Shrine in Nara, Japan. The deer panel is one of the four traditional symbols, the others were a stag, the sun, and the moon, most of which are damaged.

The garden contains American and Japanese plants, and its theme is the peaceful harmony of Japan–United States relations. The garden is meant to resemble natural scenery but at a small scale, with representation of mountains, islands and lakes.

== Gallery ==
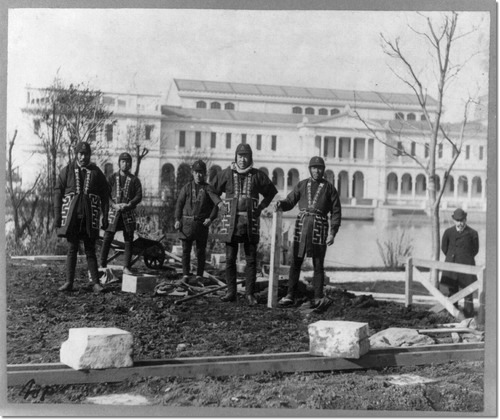
Japanese builders on site constructing the pavilion

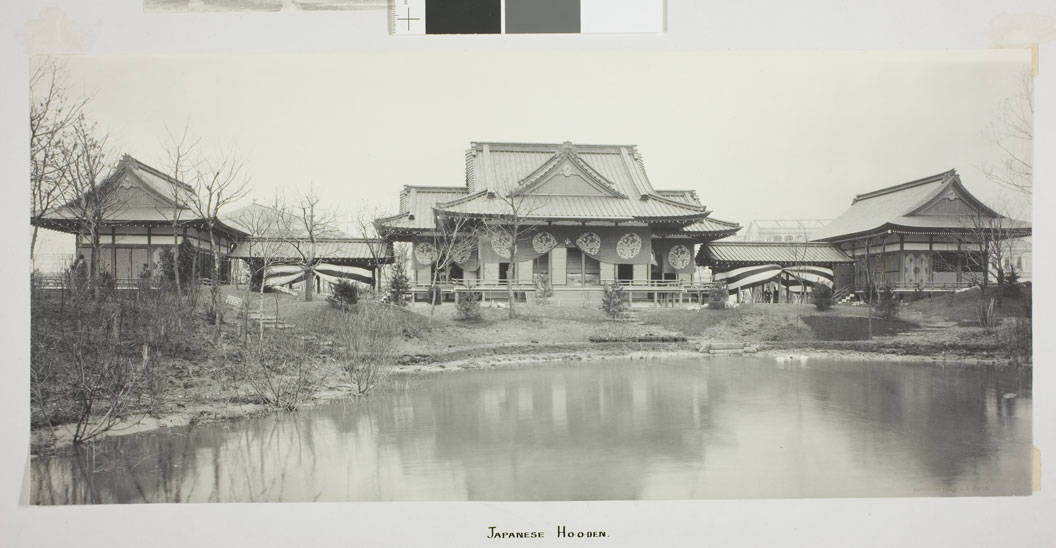
Front façade of the "Phoenix Palace" building

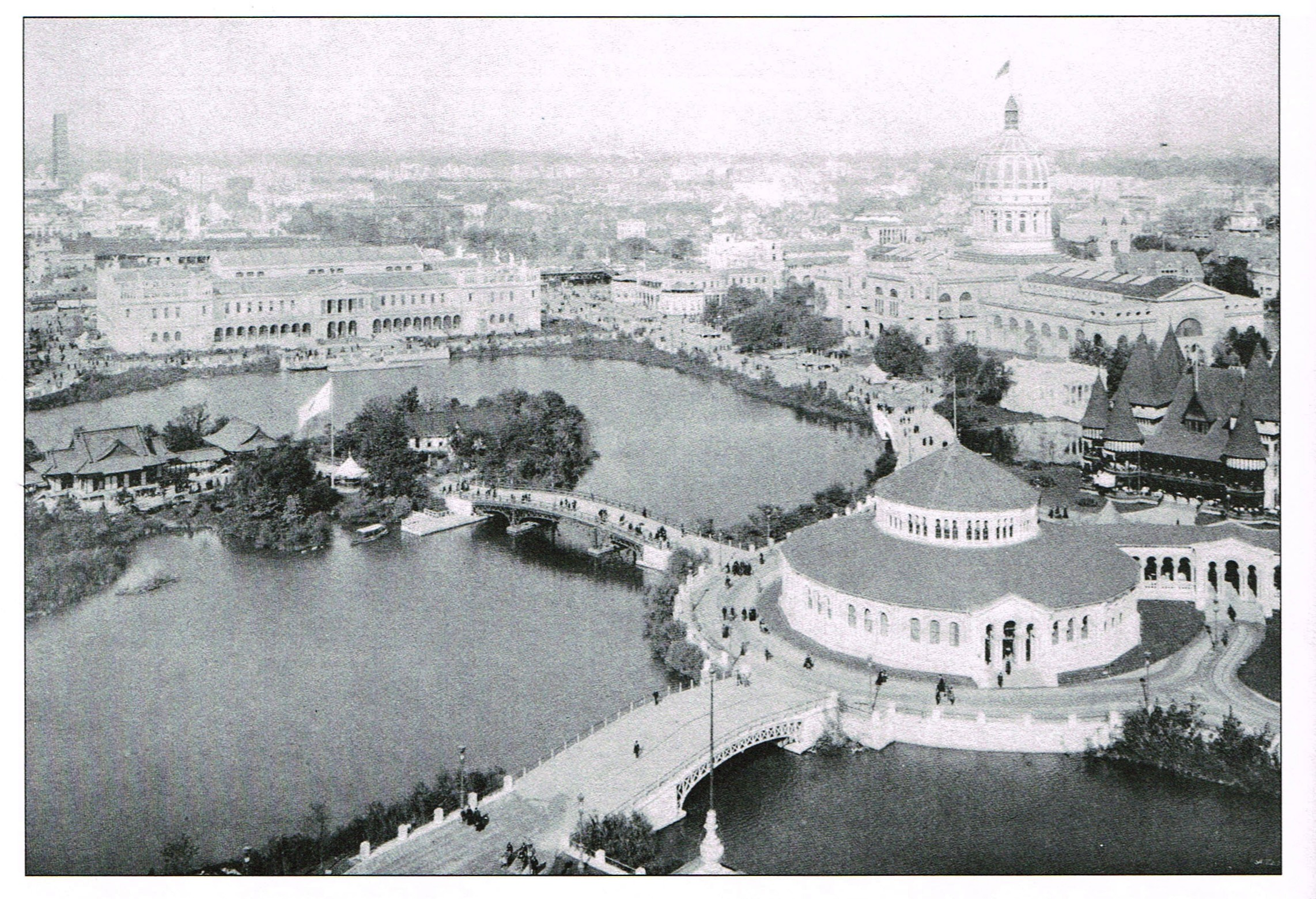
The park site, 1893; Ho-O-Den visible at the center left

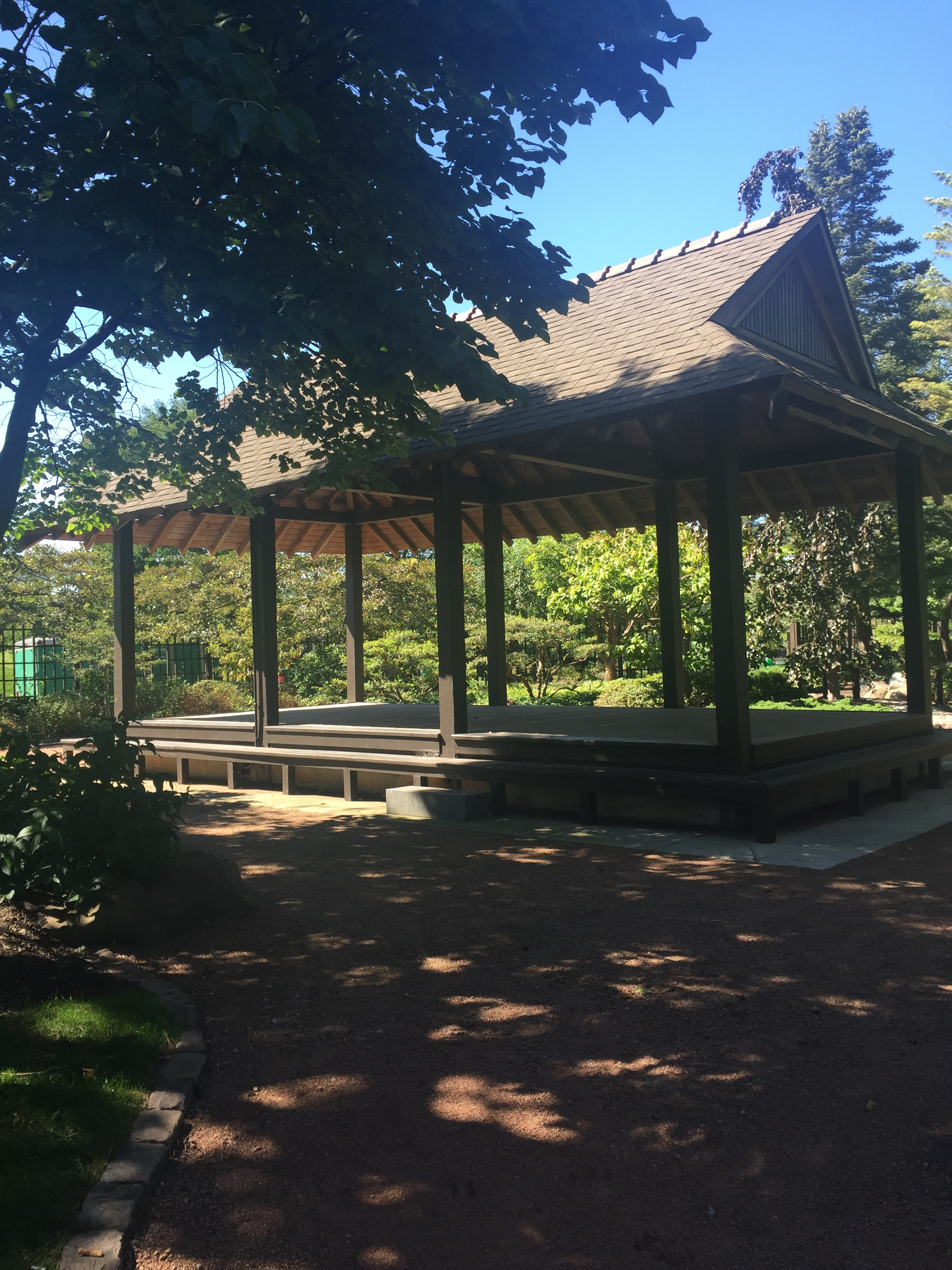
Osaka Pavilion

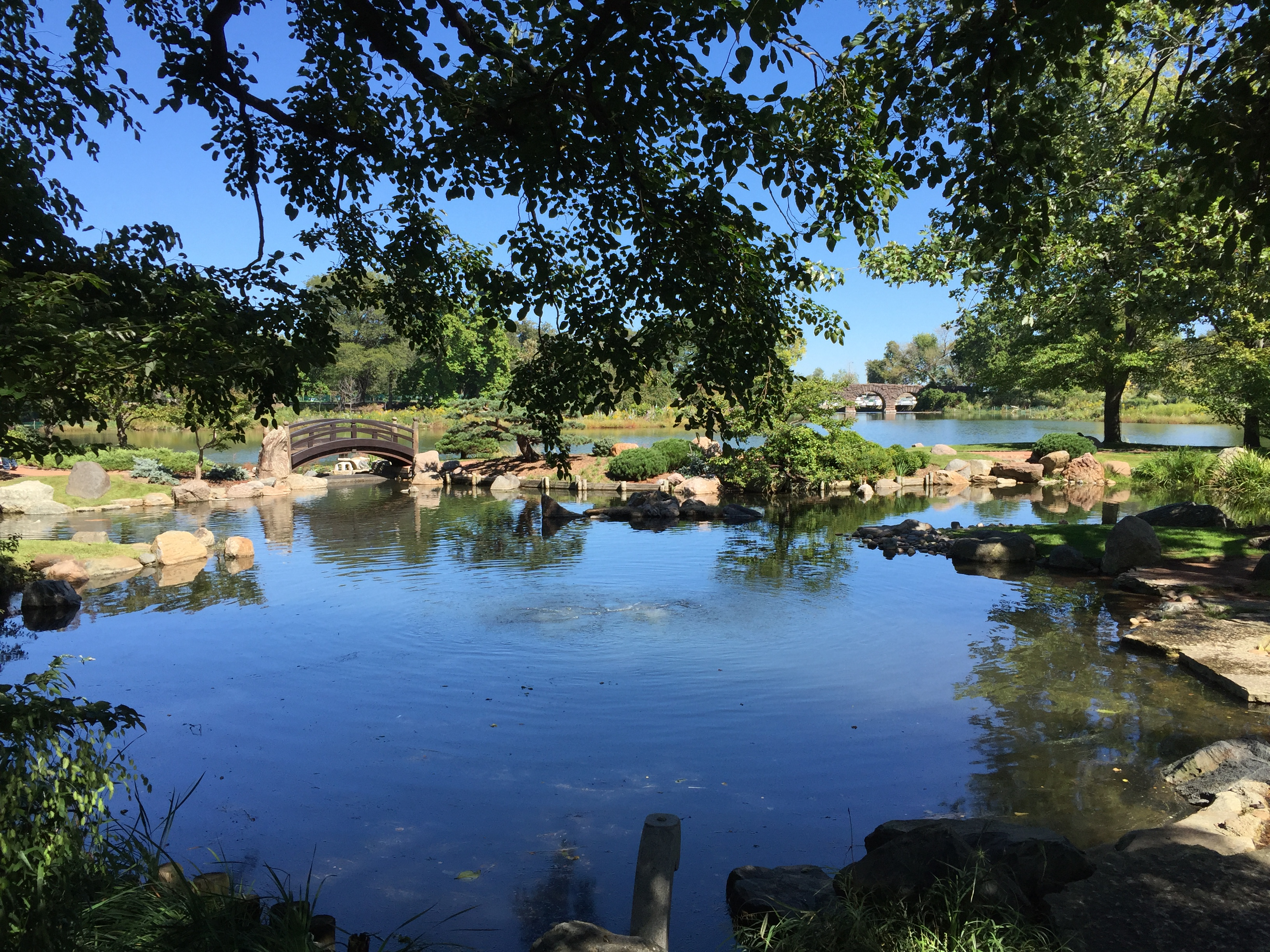
Koi pond

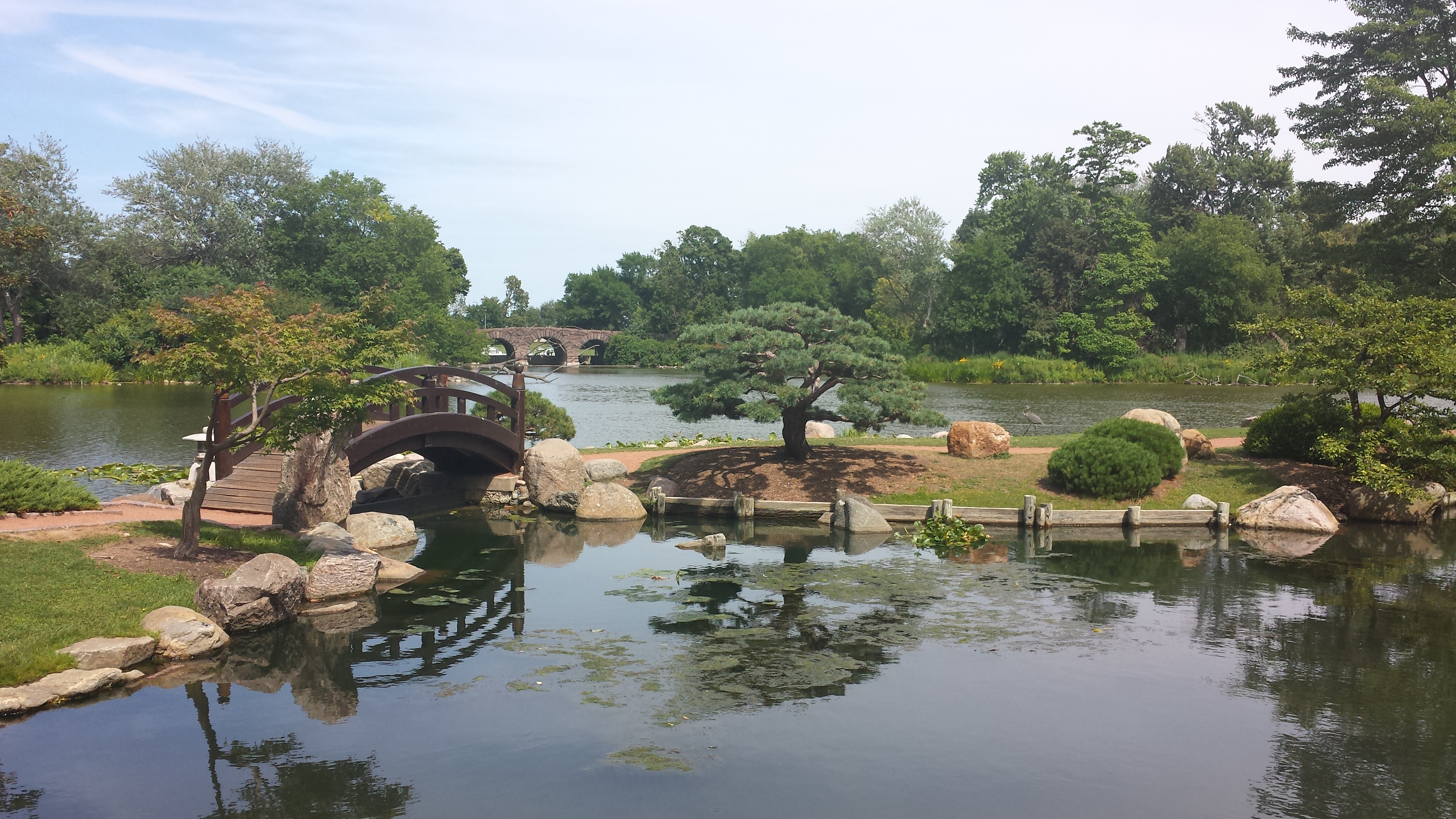
Bridge
