= USS Lydonia =

Patrol vessel of the United States Navy

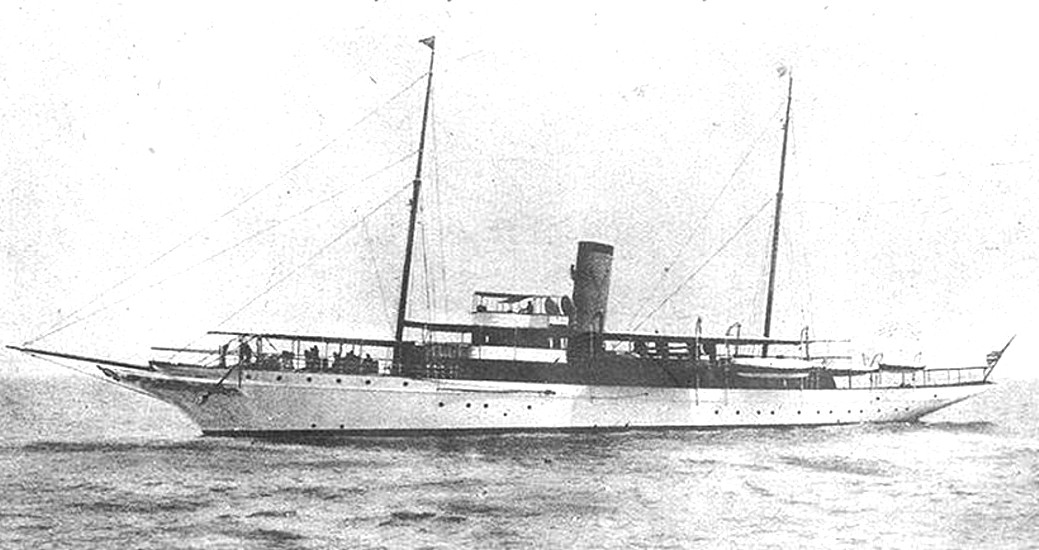
- The civilian steam yacht SS Lydonia II prior to her 1917 acquisition by the United States Navy.

History

United States
- Name: USS Lydonia
- Namesake: Modification of Lydonia II, the ship's civilian name when acquired
- Operator: United States Navy
- Builder: Pusey and Jones, Wilmington, Delaware
- Laid down: April 1911
- Launched: 25 July 1911
- Completed: 1912
- Acquired: 21 August 1917
- Commissioned: 27 October 1917
- Decommissioned: 7 August 1919
- Fate: Transferred to U.S. Coast and Geodetic Survey 7 August 1919
- Notes: Served as civilian yacht SS Lydonia II 1912–1917, owned by William A. Lydon

United States
- Name: USC&GS Lydonia
- Namesake: U.S. Navy name retained
- Operator: U.S. Coast and Geodetic Survey
- Acquired: 7 August 1919
- Commissioned: 1919
- Decommissioned: 1947
- Identification: CS 302

General characteristics (as U.S. Navy vessel)
- Type: Patrol vessel
- Tonnage: 497 GRT
- Length: 181 ft (55 m), 214 ft (65.2 m) length overall
- Beam: 26 ft (7.9 m)
- Draft: 11 ft 5 in (3.48 m)
- Propulsion: Steam engine
- Speed: 12 knots (22 km/h; 14 mph)
- Complement: 34
- Armament: 4 × 3 in (76 mm) guns; 2 × machine guns

General characteristics (as U.S. Coast and Geodetic Survey vessel)
- Type: Coastal survey ship
- Length: 180.5 ft (55.0 m)
- Beam: 26 ft (7.9 m)
- Draft: 11.5 ft (3.5 m)
- Propulsion: Steam engine

USS Lydonia (SP-700) was United States Navy patrol vessel in commission from 1917 to 1919 that saw service during World War I. Prior to her U.S. Navy service, she had been William A. Lydon's private yacht, Lydonia II, from 1912 to 1917. She spent most of the war based at Gibraltar, escorting and protecting Allied ships in the Mediterranean and along the Atlantic Ocean coast of Europe. After her U.S. Navy service ended, she served from 1919 to 1947 in the United States Coast and Geodetic Survey as the coastal survey ship USCGS Lydonia (CS-302).

== Construction ==
Lydonia II was constructed for William A. Lydon, commodore of the Chicago Yacht Club, by Pusey and Jones in Wilmington, Delaware as Hull #348 under contract #1205 received 20 February 1911 and was more than 250 gross tons larger than the first yacht bearing the name, Lydonia I, completed for Lydon just two years earlier. (Note: Lydonia I was possibly confusingly Hull #338.) Named in honor of Lydon's family Lydonia II was designed by William A. Gardner with construction started in early April 1911. She was launched on 25 July 1911. Fitting out took nine months with completion 1 March 1912 and sea trials taking place on 1 May 1912. On registration the yacht was assigned signal letters LCGQ with a home port of Chicago. She was described as the "queen of the Great Lakes fleet" and "the finest on the Great Lakes."

== Description (as built) ==
Sources agree, using similar or the same measurement methods, for dimensions except for the yacht's length. The length overall is given as 212 ft 6 in (64.8 m); length on load waterline of 170 ft 6 in (52.0 m) and length overall 214 ft (65.2 m) with 181 ft (55.2 m) being a different method of measurement used in contemporary government sources that also state length overall. (Note: The 181-foot measurement, compared to the others, fits within the range of and is likely the registered length method of measurement.) The beam of 26 ft (7.9 m) with draft at 11 ft 5 in (3.5 m) agrees within inches.

=== Hull ===
The steel hull incorporated five water tight bulkheads and three non-watertight bulkheads that extended from keel to the main deck. One transverse and two side bunkers provided storage for 125 tons of coal loaded through four coaling scuttles with water tight openings on the main deck. Water tanks with 5,000 US gallons (19,000 L; 4,200 imp gal) capacity were fitted within the hull.

=== Interior spaces ===
The forecastle, composing about the first sixty-five feet (20 m) feet of the ship, was flush decked. Astern of the forecastle the hull, without apparent break, became a bulwark rail enclosing the main deck with a deckhouse running from the forecastle to within about sixty feet (18 m) of the stern. The second deck, designated the "berth deck," contained the owner's and guest's quarters consisting of ten staterooms, with one large double stateroom aft, and four bath rooms. Those spaces were separated amidships by the machinery space. Above the main deck was the shade deck that extended the full width of the ship, providing cover for the open decks below and storage for lifeboats as well as open deck space for passengers. At the forward portion of the shade deck was a chart room that doubled as a smoking room lounge. Above that space was the navigating bridge.

The forward portion of the forecastle, beyond the collision bulkhead, was a paint locker reached from the forecastle deck by a hatch and ladder. Aft of the collision bulkhead on the berth deck were quarters with folding steel pipe berths for fifteen men and a stateroom with two fixed berths for quartermasters. Those quarters were reached by a hatch in the forecastle deck and a hatch in the berth deck led to a wash room and toilet and four additional steel pipe berths. Forward of that lower forecastle crew space was the chain locker adequate to store 150 fathoms (900 ft; 270 m) of chain. Aft of the forecastle crew space were the officer's quarters reached by a separate forecastle companion hatch to a lobby off of which were six officer's staterooms and one bath.

Between the officer's quarters and the bunker and machinery housing on the berth deck were two large staterooms using the entire width of the yacht, a smaller stateroom and a bath room and lobby with a curved stair to the main deck. These owner's spaces were finished in African mahogany; natural grain and rubbed to a finish for the lobby and painted white for the staterooms. The rooms were furnished in canopy beds specially designed for the purpose. The bathroom contained a tub, lavatory, toilet and was lighted and ventilated by a skylight. Aft of the machinery space amidship were the guest's quarters of six single staterooms, one large double stateroom extending the width of the yacht with a skylight, and three bath rooms. They connect by a longitudinal passageway with stairs to the library in the deckhouse on the main deck. They were finished in a similar manner to the owner's spaces with African mahogany.

The main deck deckhouse forward contained the dining saloon filling the full width with views forward and to the sides. The saloon was finished in carved and paneled teak with the ceiling in dull guilt and furnished with a large polished teak round table that could extend to seat sixteen people. Aft of the dining saloon on the port side were pantry and galley. Various service spaces were located forward of the engine room casing that had a large observation window fitted for viewing the machinery from the starboard deck passage. The after end of the deck house contained first a roomy library fitted with bookcases with a domed skylight above for light. Aft was a music room through which the main mast passed that was furnished with comfortable seating with the stair to the guest's staterooms in the aft starboard corner. All was paneled in African mahogany with gilt ceilings.

=== Engineering ===
The main engine was a triple expansion type with cylinders of 16 in (41 cm), 26 in (66 cm), and 30 in (76 cm) with 24 in (61 cm) stroke with 1,000 ihp (750 kW). Steam was provided by a main boiler 14 ft 3 in (4.3 m) in diameter with a working pressure of 185 pounds. A vertical type donkey boiler, 4 ft 9 in (1.4 m) in diameter, was located in the fire room convenient to the coal bunkers. Those bunkers had a capacity for 125 tons of coal. A steam steering engine and double cylinder windlass were included in the machinery aboard.

Two General Electric generating sets, 10 and 4 kilowatts (13.4 and 5.4 hp), provided electricity for living and operating spaces as well as a 14 in (36 cm) searchlight on the bridge. Refrigeration machinery was not immediately fitted but provisions for such machinery had been made in construction of a large ice box built into the after end of the forward hold.

== United States Navy service ==
The U.S. Navy purchased Lydonia II from Lydon on 21 August 1917 for $170,000 for use as a patrol vessel during World War I. Slightly modifying her name, the Navy commissioned her as USS Lydonia (SP-700) on 27 October 1917.

After repairs and target practice off Bermuda, Lydonia departed the Caribbean in mid-November 1917 and arrived at Horta in the Azores on 7 December 1917. Two weeks later, she arrived at Gibraltar to join the U.S. Navy patrol squadron operating along the Atlantic and Mediterranean sides of the Strait of Gibraltar.

=== Mediterranean operations ===
Lydonia spent the early months of 1918 protecting Allied Mediterranean supply convoys from attacks by Imperial German Navy submarines (U-boats). She made two attacks on enemy submarines in February 1918 but did not sink them.

On 8 May 1918, Lydonia was steaming with a convoy from Bizerte, Tunisia, to Gibraltar when the German submarine SM UB-70 torpedoed and sank one of the convoy's ships, the British merchant ship SS Ingleside. Lydonia joined the British Royal Navy destroyer HMS Basilisk in counterattacking UB-70 beginning at 17:35, with the two ships making coordinated depth charge attacks. After 15 minutes, Lydonia and Basilisk ceased their attack and turned their attention to rescuing the survivors of Ingleside. Heavy seas prevented an immediate assessment of possible damage to UB-70, but later evaluations credited Lydonia and Basilisk with sinking the submarine.

For the rest of the war, Lydonia continued her escort operations between Bizerte and Gibraltar. After the conclusion of the war on 11 November 1918, she called at the Azores and Caribbean ports on her way back to the United States, where she arrived at Hampton Roads, Virginia, on 6 February 1919.

=== Decommissioning and transfer ===
The U.S. Navy decommissioned Lydonia at Norfolk, Virginia, 7 August 1919 and transferred her to the United States Coast and Geodetic Survey the same day. (Note: Lydon died on 28 October 1918 only days before war's end and his yacht had finished war service.)

== United States Coast and Geodetic Survey service ==
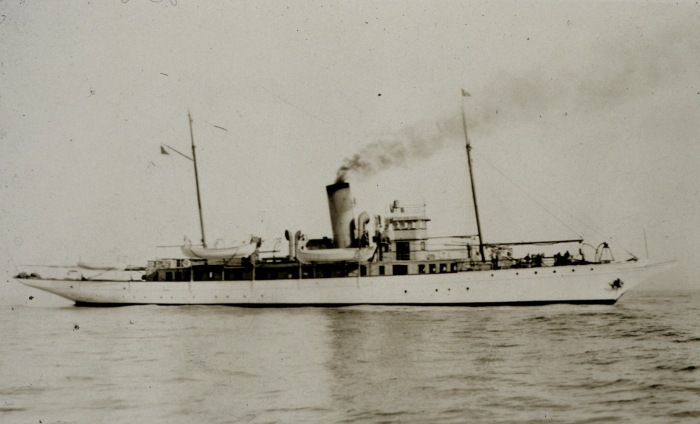
USC&GS Lydonia

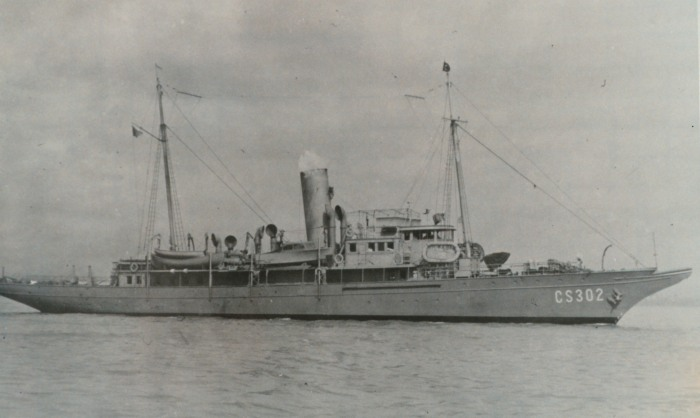
USC&GS Lydonia during World War II, during which the United States Coast and Geodetic Survey operated under the orders of the United States Navy.

In Coast and Geodetic Survey service, Lydonia became the coastal survey ship USC&GS Lydonia (CS 302). Intended for Coast and Geodetic Survey service along the coast of California, she fitted out at Norfolk until September 1919, when she departed for San Francisco, California, outfitting for hydrographic survey work during October 1919. In November 1919 she surveyed between Cape Mendocino and Point Arena. She then underwent repair and outfitting for service in the Territory of Alaska, for which she departed on 20 June 1919. She later served primarily along the United States East Coast and in the Atlantic Ocean while with the Survey.

On several occasions during her long Coast and Geodetic Survey career, Lydonia assisted mariners in distress. On 7 August 1921, she assisted in helping survivors and searching for bodies in the wreck of the steamboat SS Alaska on Blunt's Reef off the coast of northern California. On 17 January 1927, she came to the aid of the United States Coast Guard Cutter Modoc, which was aground at the entrance to the Cape Fear River in North Carolina, joining a tug in refloating Modoc at high tide. In May 1927, she and the survey ship USC&GS Hydrographer were sent to Memphis, Tennessee, to help victims of the great Mississippi River flood of that year.

On 23 August 1933, Lydonia was with the Coast and Geodetic Survey survey ships USC&GS Oceanographer and USC&GS Gilbert at Norfolk, Virginia, when the 1933 Chesapeake–Potomac hurricane struck; the three ships handled considerable radio traffic for the Norfolk area, including U.S. Navy traffic, during the storm. On 24 April 1935, she directed the United States Coast Guard to the fishing trawler Malolo, which was disabled off the coast of Virginia. And in January 1937, Coast and Geodetic Survey personnel from her crew and from that of Oceanographer were detached to join three Coast and Geodetic Survey launches at Kenova, West Virginia, where they performed flood relief work under the direction of the Red Cross. Lydonia′s commanding officer in 1941, Lieutenant Commander H. Arnold Karo, went on to serve as director of the Coast and Geodetic Survey from 1955 to 1965 and as deputy administrator of the Environmental Science Services Administration from 1965 to 1967 and became the first Coast and Geodetic Survey Corps officer to reach the rank of vice admiral.

Along with the rest of the Coast and Geodetic Survey's ships, Lydonia operated in support of U.S. Navy requirements during the participation of the United States in World War II (1941–1945), although she remained a part of the Survey during the war.

The Coast and Geodetic Survey retired Lydonia from service in 1947.

== Commemoration ==
Lydonia Canyon, an undersea canyon in the Atlantic Ocean off the Gulf of Maine on the slope of the Georges Bank, is named for USC&GS Lydonia.
