= Washington Park, Chicago =

Washington Park, Chicago may refer to:

- Washington Park (community area), Chicago, a Chicago community area
- Washington Park (Chicago park), a public city park in the above community area
- Washington Park Race Track, a historic horse racing track once located one block south of the above park
- Washington Park Subdivision, a historic subdivision on the site of the former race track

== See also ==
- Washington Park Court District, a Chicago Landmark neighborhood
- Dinah Washington Park, a public city park in the Chicago Park District
- Harold Washington Park, a public city park in the Chicago Park District
- Washington Heights, Chicago, a Chicago community area
- Washington Square Park (Chicago), a public city park in the Chicago Park District
