= Harold Washington Park =

Park in Chicago, Illinois, US

Coordinates: 41.8024°N 87.5840°W

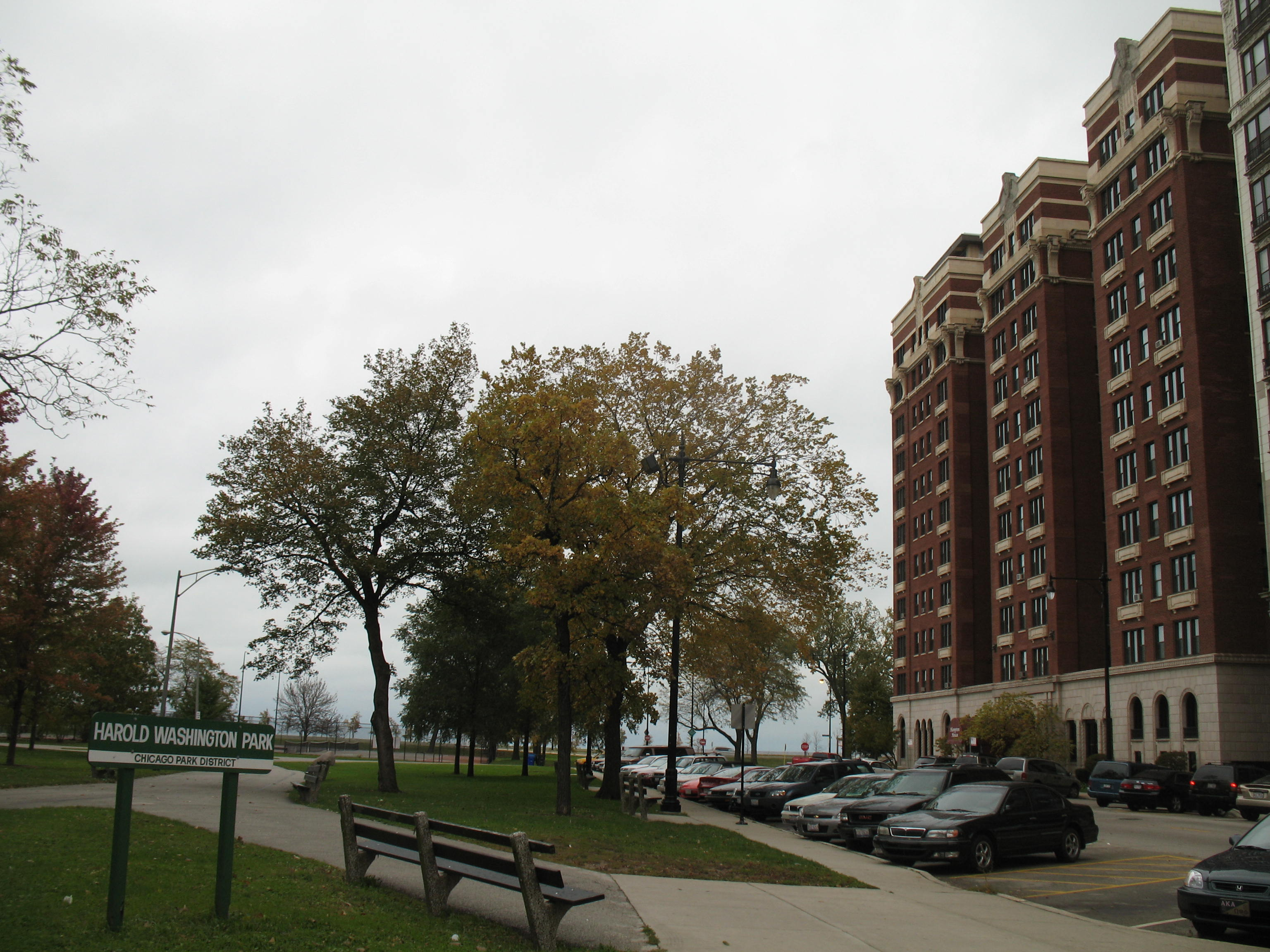
- Harold Washington Park and Hampton House, October 2006
- Interactive map of Harold Washington Park
- Type: Municipal
- Location: Chicago, Cook County, Illinois
- Operator: Chicago Park District
- Status: Open all year

Harold Washington Park is a small (10 acre) park in the Chicago Park District located in the Hyde Park community area on the South Side of Chicago, Illinois, United States. In 1992, it was named for Harold Washington (1922–1987), the first African-American Chicago Mayor. The Park District officially calls the park Harold Washington Playlot Park with a designated address of 5200 S. Hyde Park Blvd Chicago, IL 60615. It is one of 4 Chicago Park District parks named after persons surnamed Washington (Washington Park, Washington Square Park, Dinah Washington Park). It is one of 40 Chicago Park District parks named after influential African Americans. The Park is bounded by East 53rd Street on the south, South Hyde Park Boulevard on the west, and Lake Shore Drive to the east. Architecturally, it is flanked to the north by Regents Park and The Hampton House to the south. Its southwest corner opposes two National Register of Historic Places Properties: Hotel Del Prado and East Park Towers.

== History ==
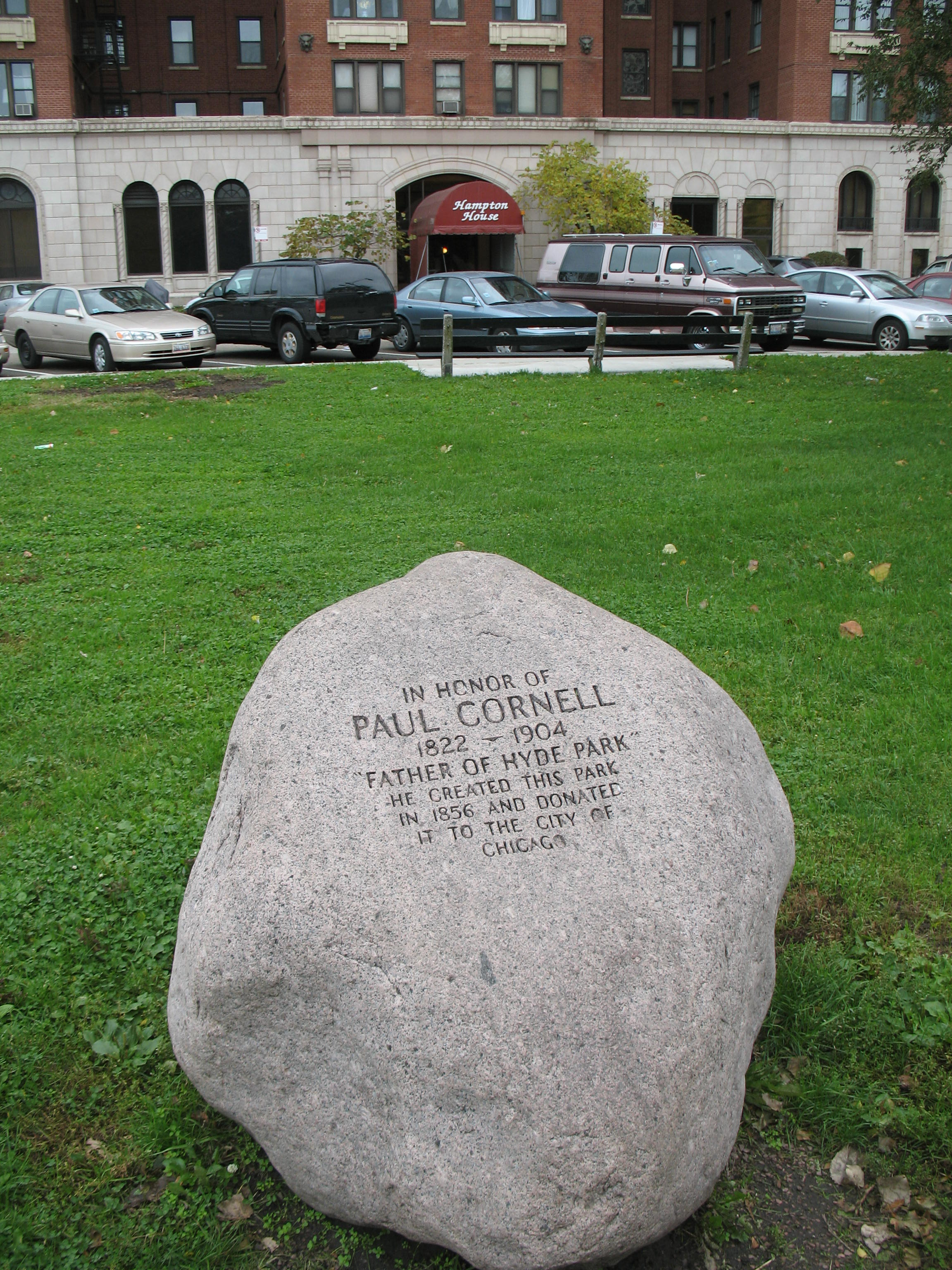
Paul Cornell's Stone in front of the Hampton House

The park was originally bequeathed to the city in 1906 by Paul Cornell as commemorated by the Paul Cornell Stone. It was then called East End Park. In 1919, it was transferred to the South Park Commission. In 1927, it became part of Burnham Park. The park district renamed the site Harold Washington Park in 1992. Until recently (c. 2004) when Park District signs were posted it had been referred to as Cornell Park by many local residents.

== Facilities ==
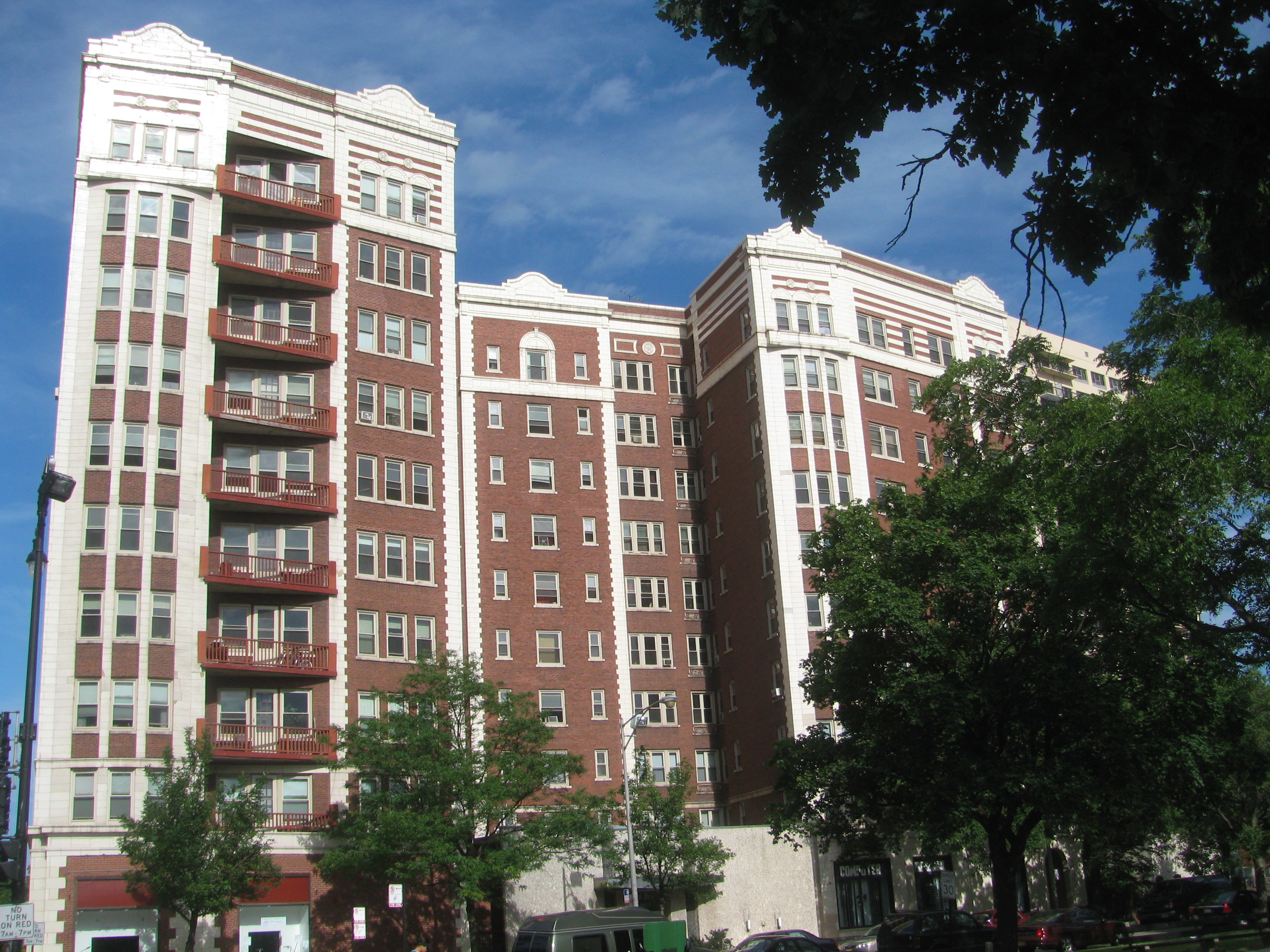
East Park Towers

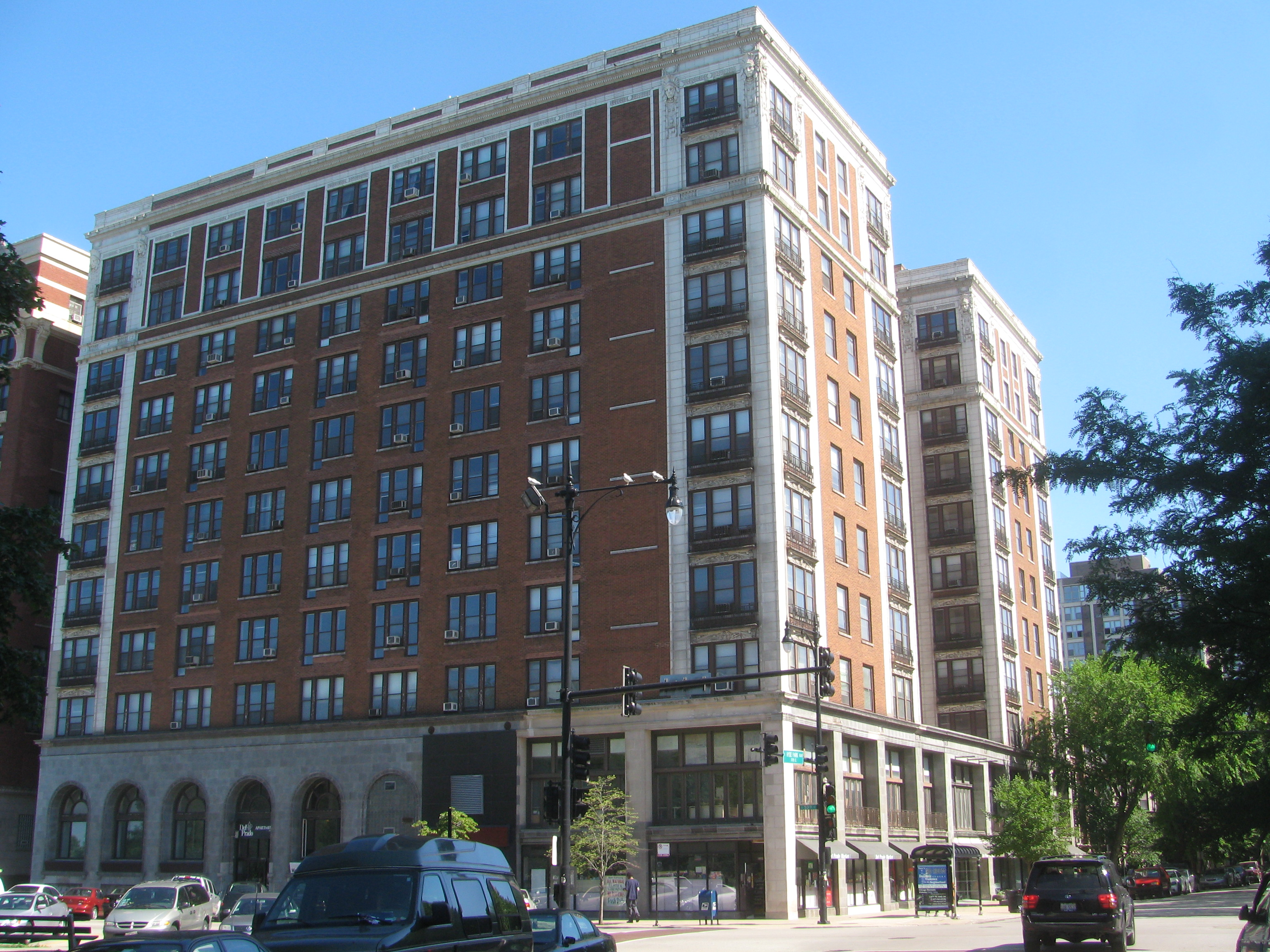
Hotel Del Prado

The park's southwest corner opposes two National Register of Historic Places

The park is mostly used by picnicking neighborhood residents and is particularly popular during the summer holidays (Memorial Day, July 4, Labor Day). The park has 8 tennis courts, an elaborate soft surface children's playground, a bathhouse and a boat pond. The park is best known for its South American monk parakeet nests. At 51st street, there is an overpass leading from the park to the bike path between Lake Shore Drive and Lake Michigan.

=== Boat Pond ===
The boat pond is mistakenly referred to as a duck pond by many local residents because it is frequented during the summer by ducks and is rarely used for recreational model boats. However, the pond has no aquatic or plant life forms (excluding weeds protruding through former cracks in the seal) to support ducks. In 2006, the pool was designated for repair and was not filled. Reconstruction began in the fall with the pool being resurfaced. A fountain and sculpture was placed in the center and dedicated in the spring of 2007 and the pool was refilled in late summer 2008.

=== Parakeet nests ===
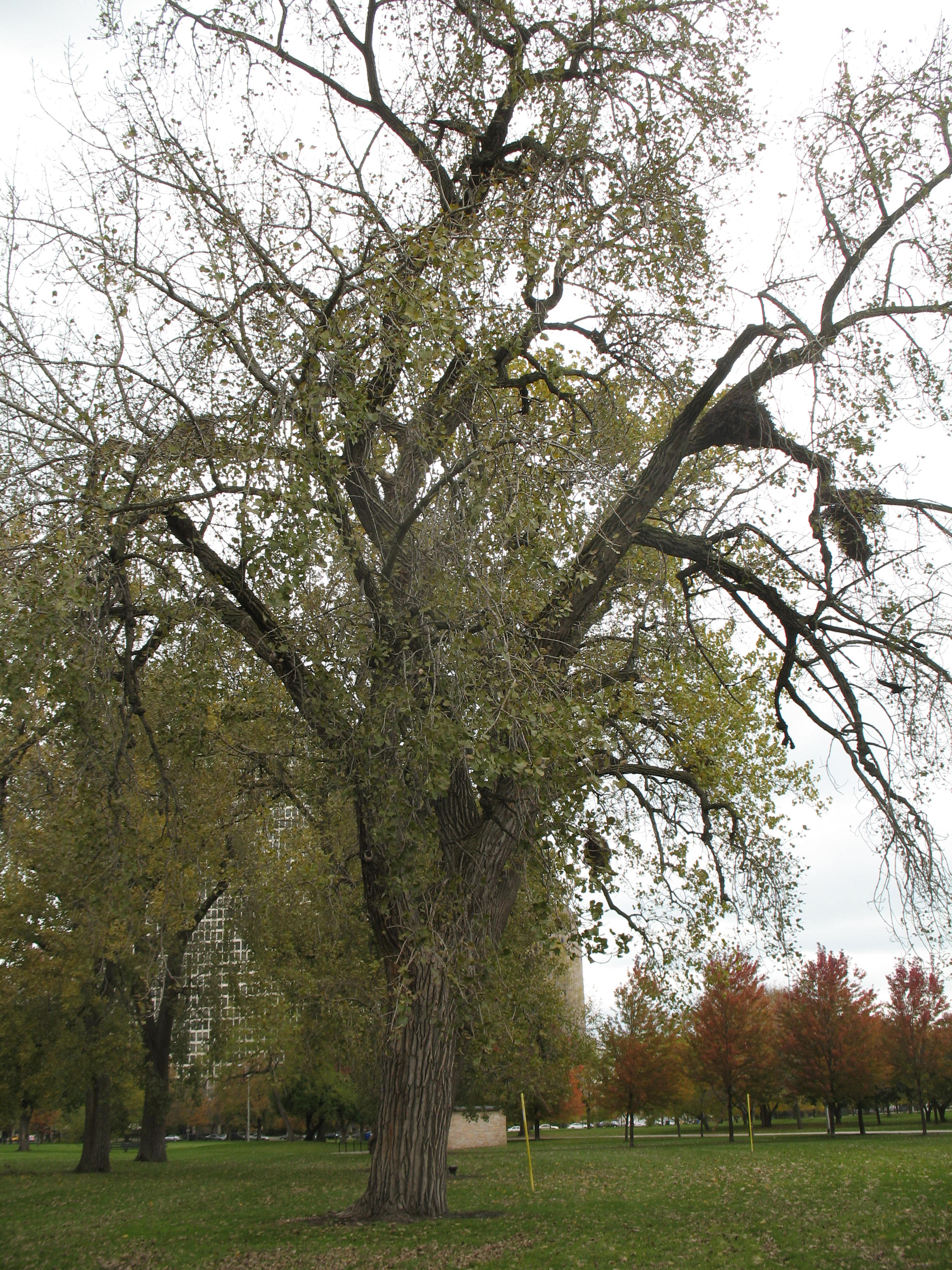
Harold Washington Park ash tree with monk parakeet nests

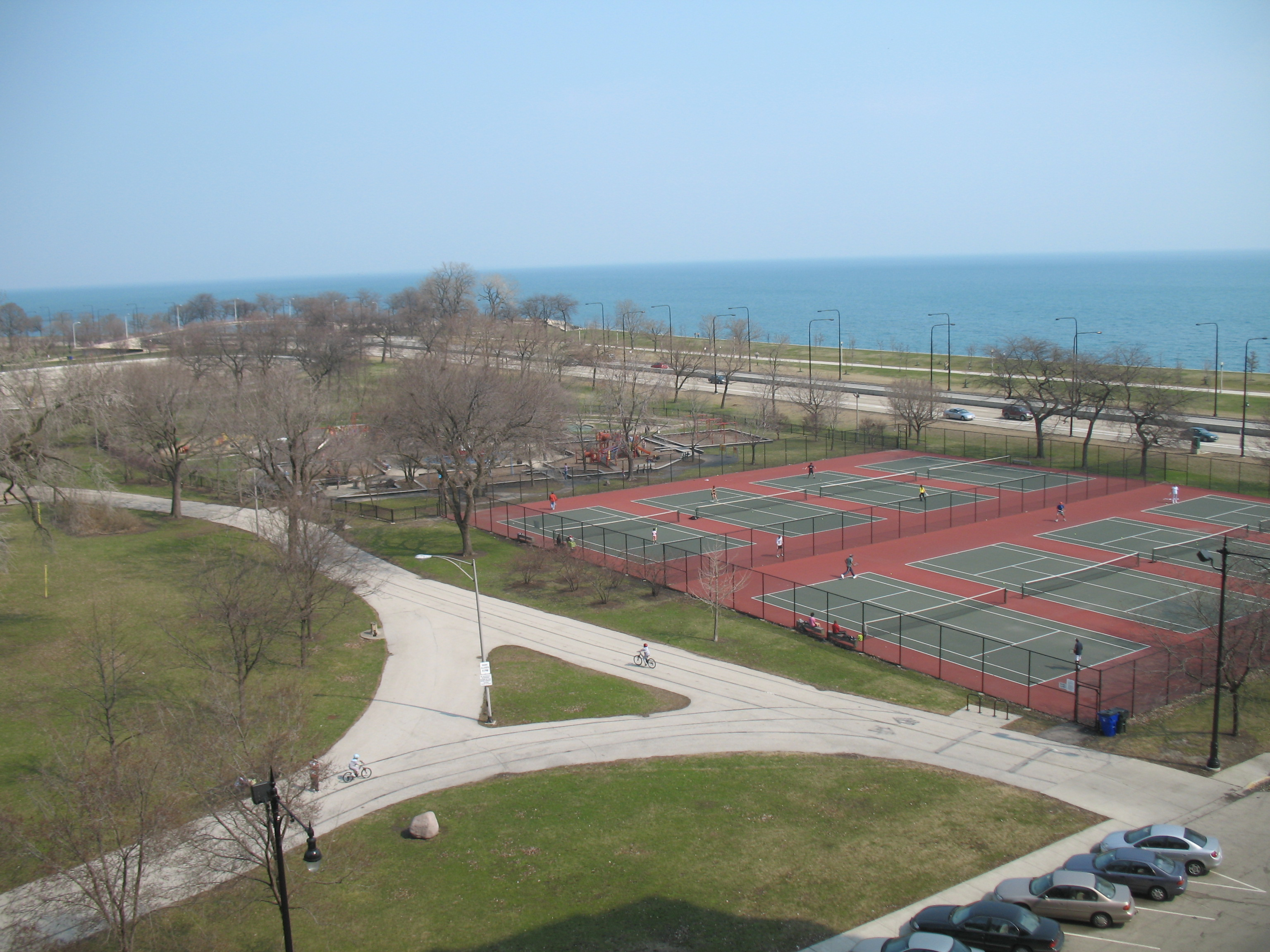
Tennis courts, playlot, boat pond. Background: Lake Shore Drive & Lake Michigan

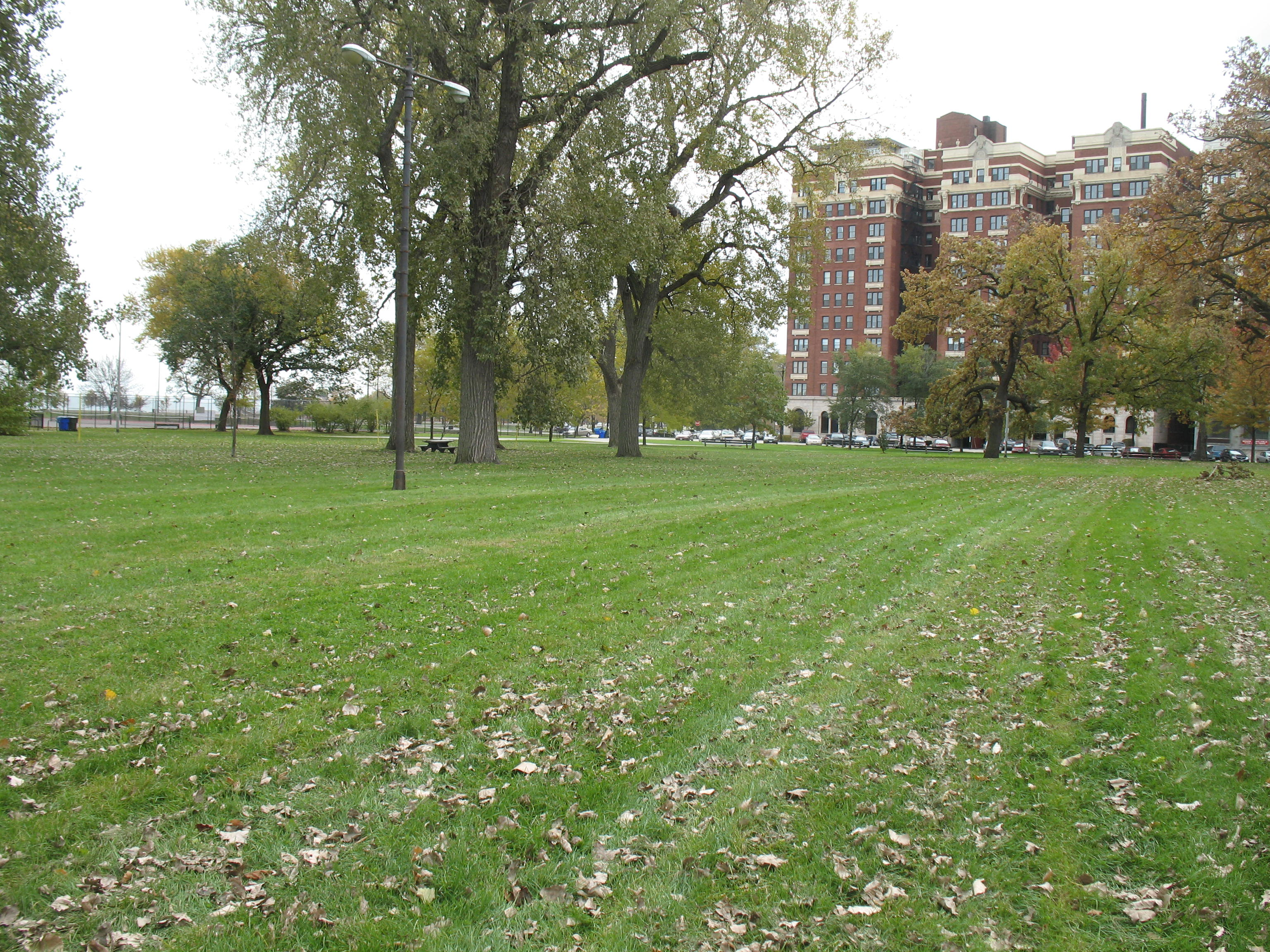

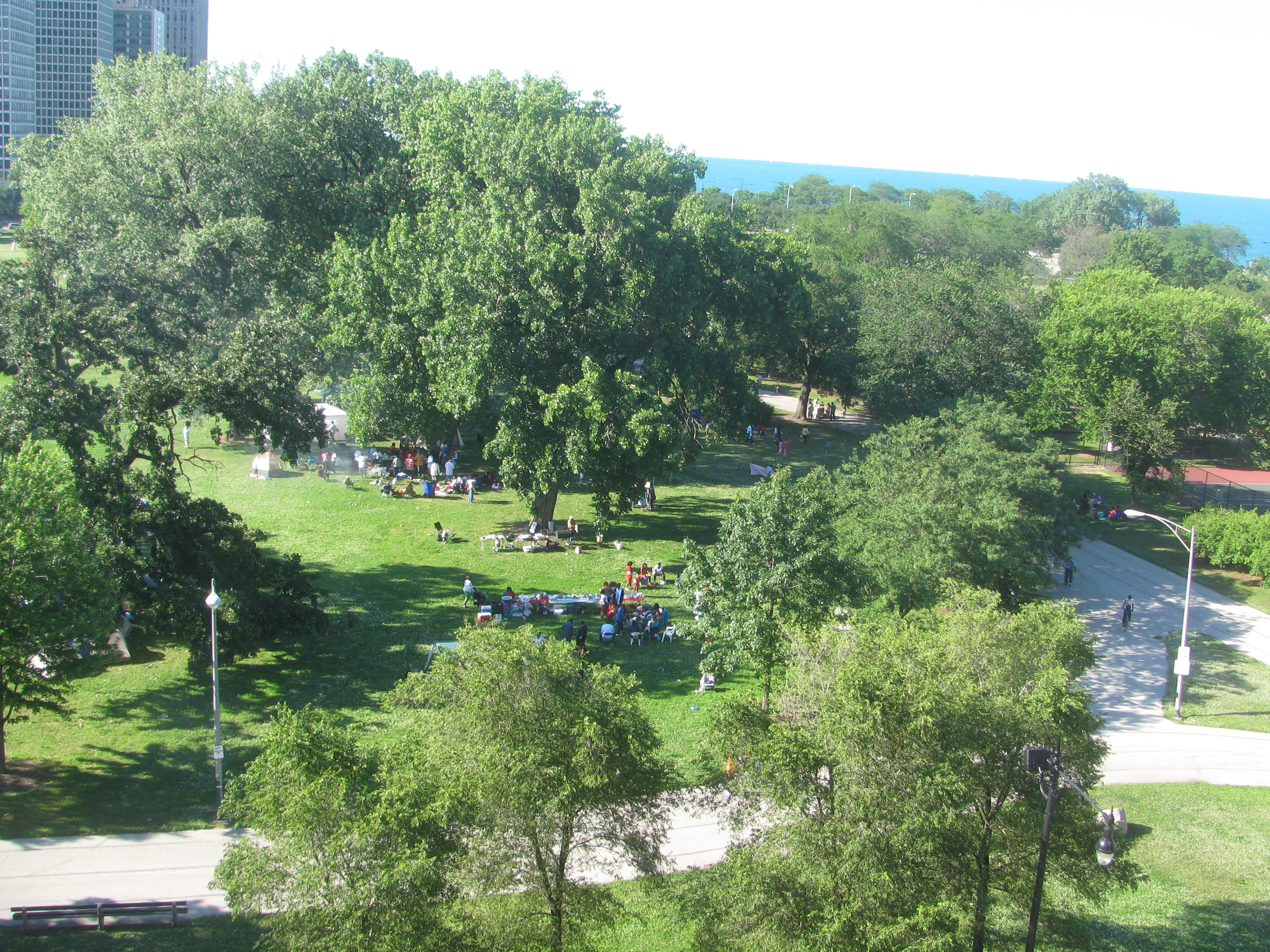
Independence Day festivities

The park's southwest corner opposes two National Register of Historic Places

In the 1980s, a dozen or so South American monk parakeets were released into the park directly across the street from the Hampton House. They settled in a large ash tree. By the summer of 1988, bird watchers counted two dozen birds in the original tree. The population has continued to redouble frequently. The flock, known to many as Harold's parakeets (after the former mayor for whom the park is named), has grown to a few hundred birds that nest throughout this park, Burnham Park and Jackson Park on the South Side of Chicago. The original tree became infested with termites and collapsed on June 12, 2004. Over 50 birds were displaced by the collapse. The nests were replaced in other nearby trees. Birdwatchers come from around the world to see this flock of birds. The birds have been a hotly contested issue pitting the U.S. Department of Agriculture against local politicians and the Harold Washington Memorial Parrot Defense Fund.

Alternate theories for the original population of birds are

- Harold Washington released a dozen or so birds during his local residence.
- A small flock of the birds escaped from a commercial shipment.
- A small flock of the birds escaped from a residential birdcage.

Regardless of their origins, the flock was ably defended by the Mayor who foiled attempts to have them removed from the local park. In 2021, a mural entitled "Harold's Parakeets" was commissioned near the park to commemorate the Mayor and the Parakeets.

== See also ==
Washington Park, Chicago (Community area)
