= Jack Sheridan (poet) =

American poet and soapbox orator

Jack Sheridan (1905–1967) was an American poet and soapbox orator particularly known for his participation in the Bughouse Square Debates, the Dil Pickle Club and the College of Complexes. He was an activist in the Industrial Workers of the World.

Jack was attracted to hobohemia whilst still at school. He soon became a regular attendee at the Dil Pickle Club. In 1928 he went to Europe via New York City staying primarily in Paris. In 1931 he returned to the US, spending time in Lower Manhattan. Here he acquired such nicknames as the "King of the Hobohemians" and the "Byron of the Soapboxes".

He married his wife Ruth in 1944 and became active in a literary group called the Druids in Chicago's Near North Side.
