= Washington Park =

Washington Park may refer to the following, all in the United States:

== Communities ==
- Washington Park, Arizona
- Washington Park, Florida
- Washington Park, Illinois
- Washington Park, New Jersey
- Washington Park, North Carolina
- Washington Park, Roanoke, Virginia
- Washington Park, Seattle, Washington

== Community areas and parks ==
- Washington Park, Denver, Colorado, listed on the National Register of Historic Places (NRHP)
- Washington Park, Atlanta, Georgia
- Washington Park, Chicago (disambiguation)
- Washington Park (Springfield, Illinois), NRHP-listed
- Washington Park (East Chicago), Indiana
- Washington Park (Michigan City, Indiana), NRHP-listed
- Washington Park (Dubuque, Iowa), NRHP-listed
- Washington Park (Newark), New Jersey, NRHP-listed
- Washington Park Historic District (Albany, New York)
- Washington Park, a municipal park in Brooklyn, New York, later renamed Fort Greene Park
- Washington Park, a private park in the Central Troy Historic District in Troy, New York
- Washington Park (Cincinnati, Ohio)
- Washington Park (Portland, Oregon)
- Washington Park, Providence, Rhode Island, a community area that formerly was a race track
- Washington Park, Milwaukee, Wisconsin—see Parks of Milwaukee

== Sports facilities ==
- Washington Park (Los Angeles), California, a former baseball park
- Washington Park Race Track, former horse racing facility in Cook County, Illinois
- Washington Park (Indianapolis), Indiana, two former baseball parks
- Washington Park (baseball), former major league baseball parks in Brooklyn, New York

== Transportation ==
- Washington Park station (MetroLink), in East St. Louis, Illinois
- Washington Park station (Newark Light Rail), in Newark, New Jersey
- Washington Park station (Portland), in Portland, Oregon

== Other uses ==
- Washington Park Handicap, an American Thoroughbred horse race
- Washington Park High School, Racine, Wisconsin

== See also ==
- Fort Washington Park, Maryland
- One Washington Park, a building in Newark, New Jersey
- Washington Park Historic District (disambiguation)
- Washington Square Park, Manhattan, New York City
