= Bughouse Square Debates =

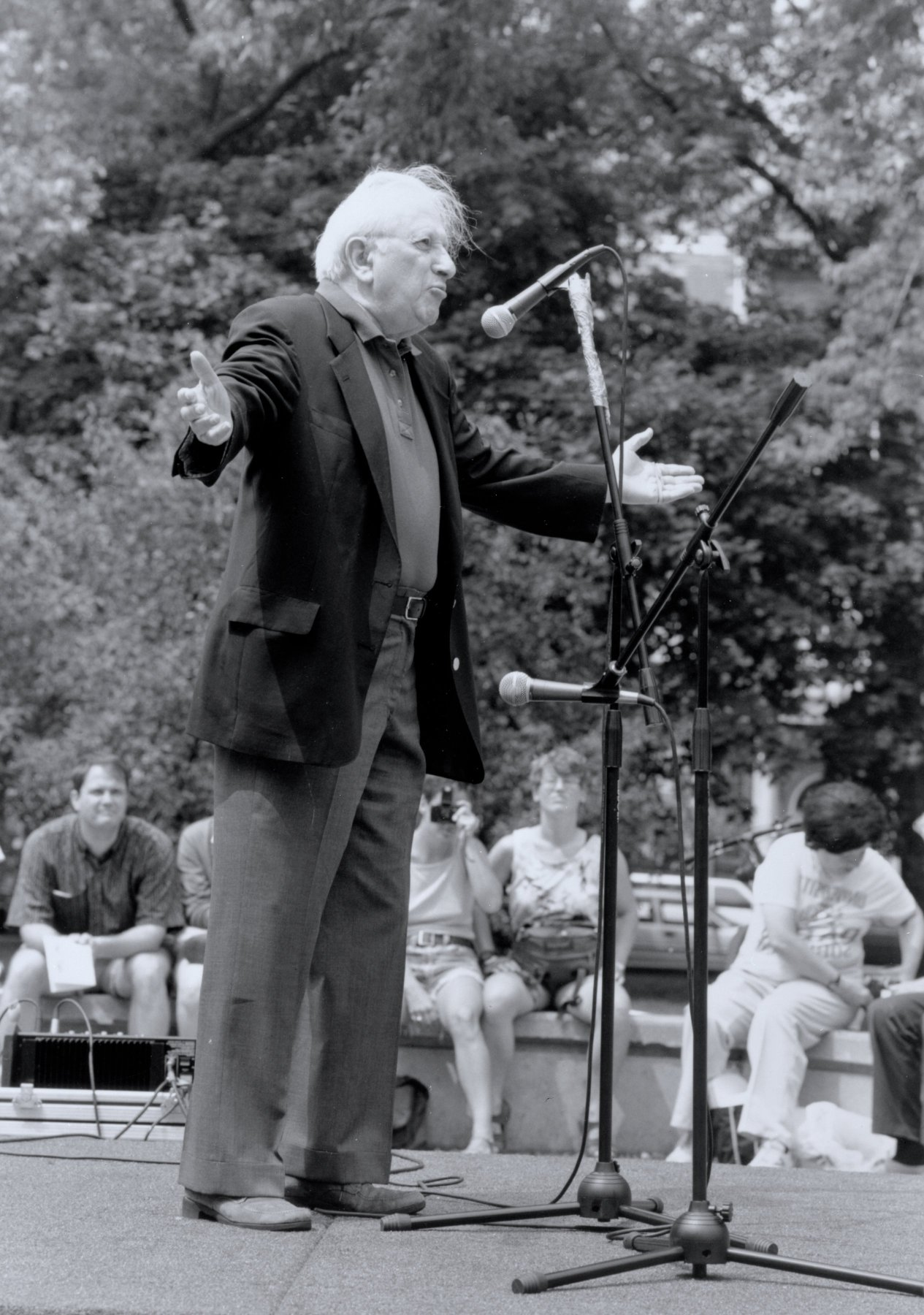
Studs Terkel addresses the annual Bughouse Square Debates, sponsored by the Newberry Library.

The Bughouse Square Debates was an annual event sponsored by the Newberry Library in Chicago. The debates took place across from the Newberry, in Washington Square Park. Soapboxes located throughout the park gave a series of scheduled speakers platforms from which they shared their opinions on a variety of issues related to education, labor, sports, religion, technology, national security, and other topics. Every year, a panel of judges presented the champion soapboxer with the Dill Pickle Award, a nod to the Dill Pickle Club, a bohemian gathering place located near the park in the early twentieth century.

In addition to the debates, the Newberry honored individuals or organizations with the John Peter Altgeld Freedom of Speech Award. Recipients of the award included Wendy Kaminer, Chicago journalists Mick Dumke and Ben Joravsky; Students Organizing to Save Our Schools; and Kartemquin Films.

The first debates organized by the Newberry were in 1986. The event was discontinued in 2021. It has been replaced by Chicago Storytelling, a program that invites Chicagoans to tell stories about the city's people, history, and culture. This event also serves as a platform to present The Pattis Family Foundation Chicago Book Award at the Newberry Library.

Washington Square Park served as a raucous public forum for many of the political radicals and intellectuals who frequented the Dill Pickle Club. "Bughouse" being popular slang for mental health facilities at the time, the word gave the park its nickname and described the fringe viewpoints and the free-flowing discourse on display there. John Drury, describing the scene for the Chicago Daily News in 1921, wrote, "free speech never was freer than in this unique spot on the near north side."

During Bughouse Square's height in the 1920s and 1930s, poets, religionists, and philosophers addressed the crowds, but the mainstays were soapboxers from the revolutionary left, especially from the Industrial Workers of the World. Many of the speakers became legendary and included anarchist Lucy Parsons, Ben Reitman, John Loughman, socialist Frank Midney, feminist-Marxist Martha Biegler, Frederick Wilkesbarr, Herbert Shaw (the "Cosmic Kid"), Kenneth Rexroth in his youth, the Sheridan twins (Jack and Jimmy), famed criminal defense lawyer Julius Lucius Echeles (about Clarence Darrow, and some of his own experiences with judges, justice and defendants); and one-armed "Cholly" Wendorf.
