= Washington Park Historic District =

Washington Park Historic District may refer to:

- Washington Park Historic District (Ottawa, Illinois)
- Washington Park Historic District (Indianapolis, Indiana)
- Washington Park Historic District (Newton, Massachusetts)
- Washington Park Historic District (North Plainfield, New Jersey), a National Register of Historic Places listing in Somerset County, New Jersey
- Washington Park Historic District (Albany, New York)
- Washington Park Historic District (Troy, New York)
- Washington Park Historic District (Winston-Salem, North Carolina), a National Register of Historic Places listing in Forsyth County, North Carolina

== See also ==
- Washington Park (disambiguation)
- Washington Park Reservoirs Historic District, Portland, OR, a National Register of Historic Places listing in Southwest Portland, Oregon
