= Washington Silva =

Washington Silva is a Brazilian name, may refer to:

- Washington Silva (boxer) (born 1976), Brazilian boxer who participated in Olympics
- Washington Roberto Mariano da Silva, (born 1985) Brazilian footballer, forward in Serbia
- Washington Luiz Mascarenhas Silva, (born 1978), Brazilian footballer
- Washington Santana da Silva, (born 1989) Brazilian footballer

== See also ==
- Washington (name)
- Silva
