= Washington Park Historic District (Newton, Massachusetts) =

Historic district in Massachusetts, United States

- U.S. National Register of Historic Places
- U.S. Historic district
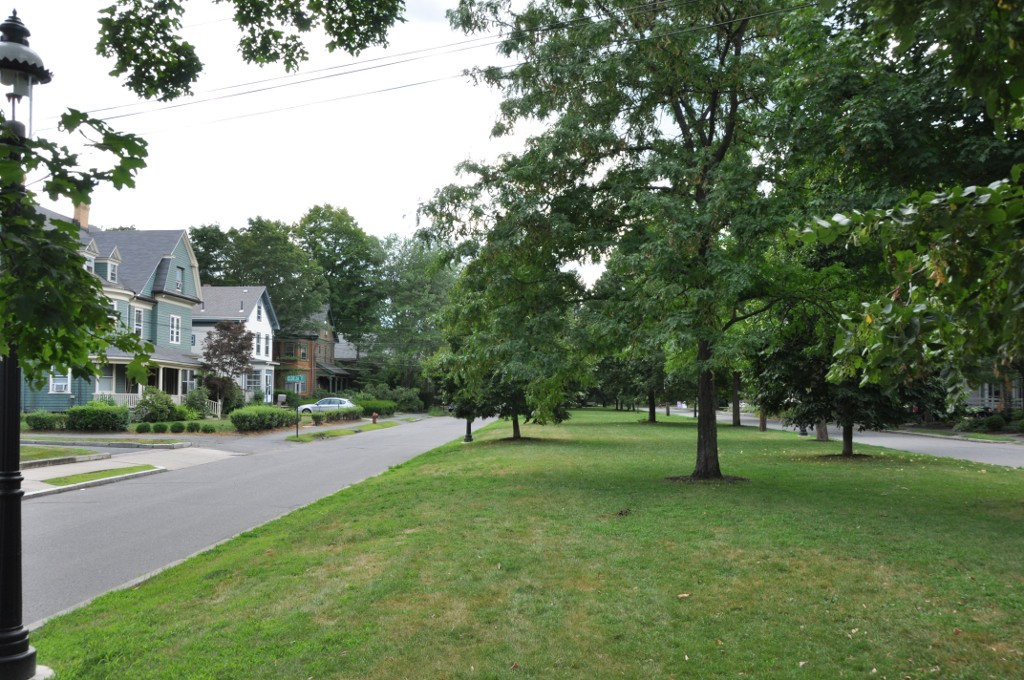

- Location within Massachusetts Location within the United States
- Location: Newton, Massachusetts
- Coordinates: 42°20′58″N 71°12′10″W
- Area: 7 acres (2.8 ha)
- Built: 1915
- Architect: Dustin Lancey; Marshall S. Rice
- Architectural style: Gothic Revival, Italianate
- MPS: Newton MRA
- NRHP reference No.: 08000166
- Added to NRHP: March 12, 2008

The Washington Park Historic District is a historic district in the village of Newtonville, in Newton, Massachusetts. It includes the following properties, dating to between 1870 and 1900: 4 to 97 Washington Park plus 5 and 15 Park Place. The focal point of the district is the city park which is located in the median of the street of the same name. On March 12, 2008, it was added to the National Register of Historic Places.

== Description and history ==
The village of Newtonville is located in central Newton, with a business district that straddles the Massachusetts Turnpike at Walnut Street. South of the highway and east of Walnut is a residential area that was laid out in 1865 and developed between 1870 and 1900. It was developed by Dustin Lancey, a Newtonville real estate developer, and was organized in a similar manner to other Newton subdivisions of the period that featured a "pocket park". In this case, Washington Park is an arborway, with a wide strip of parkland dividing the travel lanes. The houses that Lancey built fronting the park were primarily marketed at middle-class workers who commuted into Boston on the railroad.

The houses built in the district reflect the architectural styles popular in the last three decades of the 20th century. There are six Second Empire houses, typified by their mansard roofs, that were all built before 1870. The Soden House at 5 Park Place is one of the finest examples of Queen Anne architecture in the district; it was built in 1890, and has the characteristic asymmetrical massing of the style, including a tower with a bellcast roof. The only Stick style house is the Leavitt House at 91 Washington Park; built in 1870, it has the applied exterior decorative woodwork of that style. The most recently built house in the district is the Goodridge House at 27-29 Washington Park, a Colonial/Craftsman duplex built in 1914.

== See also ==
- Washington Park Historic District (disambiguation)
- National Register of Historic Places listings in Newton, Massachusetts
