= Dinah Washington Park =

Park in Chicago, Illinois, United States

Coordinates: 41.7456°N 87.5767°W

Dinah Washington Park is a park located at 8215 S. Euclid Avenue in the South Chicago community area of Chicago, Illinois, United States. It was named for singer and Chicago resident Dinah Washington. It is one of four Chicago Park District parks named after persons surnamed Washington (the others being Washington Park, Harold Washington Park and Washington Square Park). It is one of 40 Chicago Park District parks named after influential African Americans.

Located in the South Side Community, Dinah Washington Park contains playground with swings, slides, and climbing apparatus. Dinah Washington Park, formally named Redbud Park, is approximately two miles away from the home she purchased in the 1950's at 82nd and Vernon Ave.

The Chicago Park District purchased the vacant lot in 1972 with the help of the U.S. Department of Housing and Urban Development. The name was changed to Dinah Washington Park in 2005.
