= Washington Square Park (Chicago) =

Park in Chicago, Illinois, U.S.

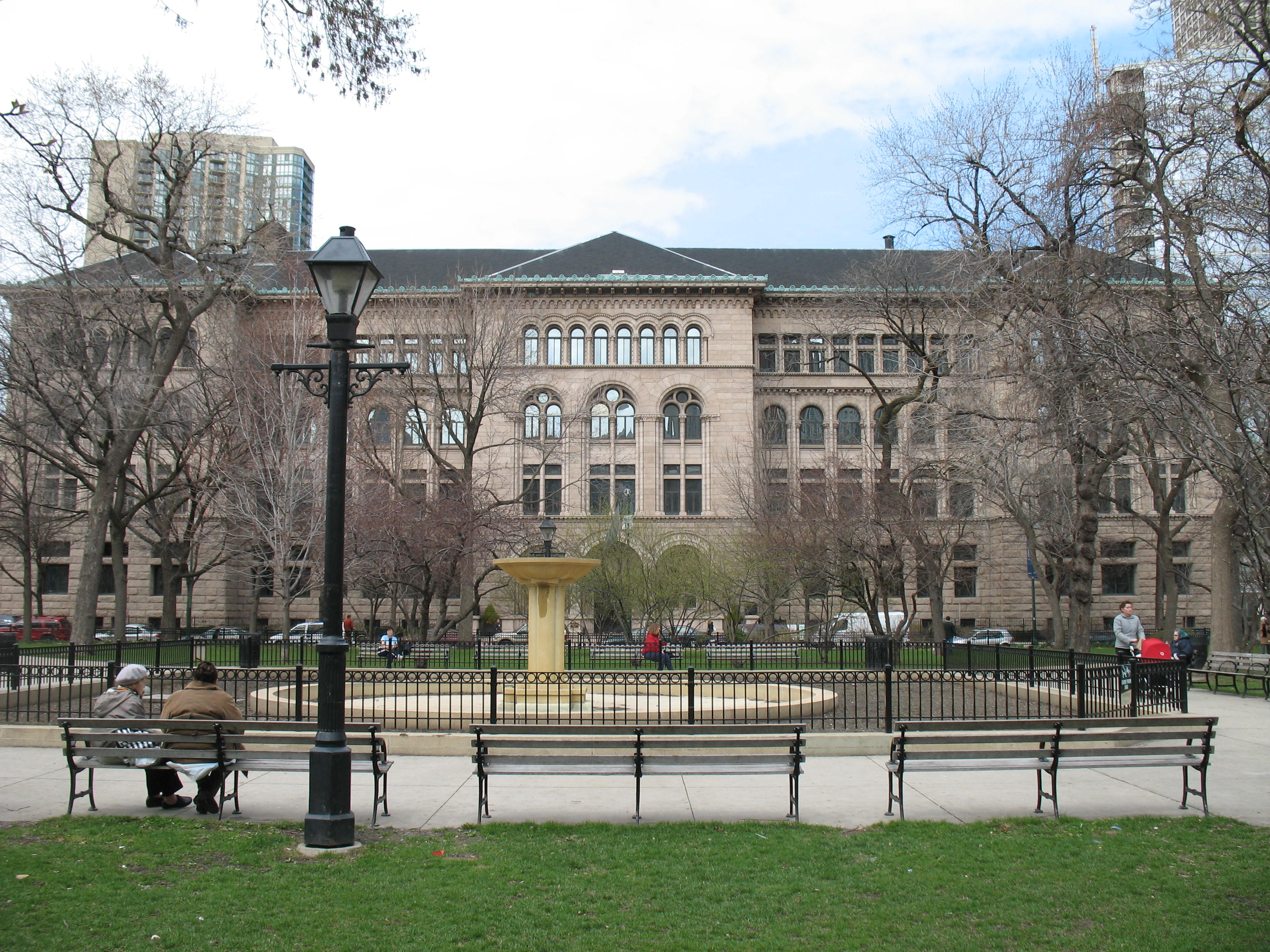
- Washington Square Park, with the Newberry Library in the background
- Interactive map of Washington Square Park
- Type: Urban park
- Location: 901 N. Clark Street, Chicago, Illinois
- Coordinates: 41°53′57″N 87°37′50″W
- Area: 3 acres (12,000 m^{2})
- Designated: September 4, 1842; 184 years ago
- Operator: Chicago Park District
- Washington Square
- U.S. National Register of Historic Places
- MPS: Chicago Park District MPS
- NRHP reference No.: 91000566
- Added to NRHP: May 20, 1991

Washington Square, also known as Washington Square Park, is a public park and registered historic landmark in Chicago, Illinois. Historically known by its nickname Bughouse Square referring to mental health facilities, it was the most celebrated open air free-speech center in the country. It is located across Walton Street from Newberry Library at 901 N. Clark Street in the Near North Side community area of Chicago. Washington Square Park is Chicago's oldest existing small park. It is one of four Chicago Park District parks named after persons surnamed Washington (the others being Washington Park, Harold Washington Park, and Dinah Washington Park). It was added to the National Register of Historic Places on May 20, 1991.

== History ==
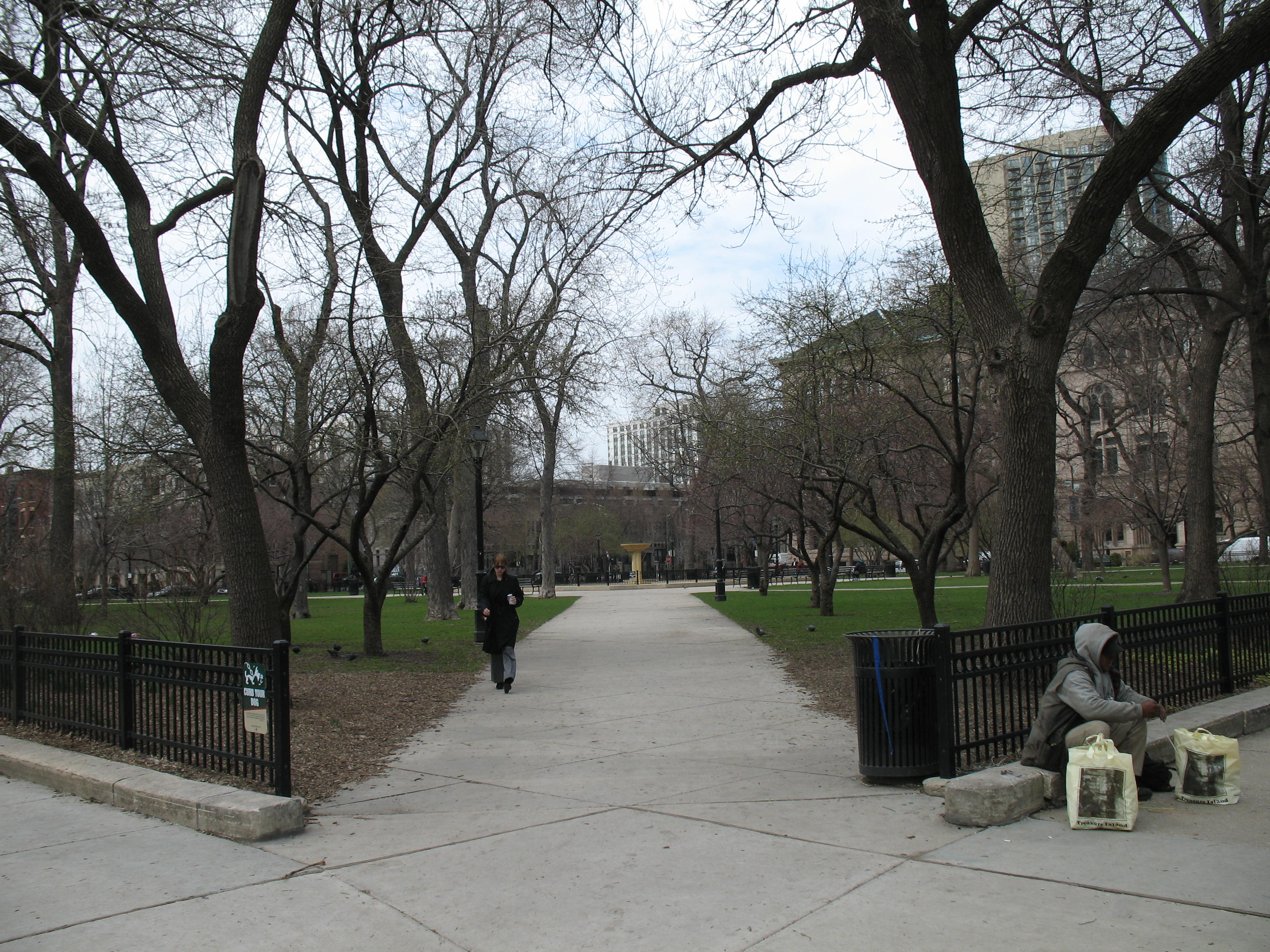
Washington Square Park Southeast entrance

On September 4, 1842, the city received a 3-acre (12,000 m^{2}) parcel that was donated by the members of the American Land Company for use as a public park. The property had once been a cow path with a well for farmers to water their cattle. The donors stipulated the name Washington Square. Between 1869 and the 1890s, the city improved Washington Square with lawn, trees, bisecting diagonal walks, limestone coping, picket fencing, and an attractive Victorian fountain. By the time Alderman McCormick became President of Drainage Board in 1906, the fountain had been razed and the park had deteriorated. Alderman McCormick devoted his aldermanic salary to improving the park. He donated a $600 fountain, and the city allocated an additional $10,000 to rehabilitate the park. By the 1910s, the neighborhood surrounding Washington Square had become more diverse.

The original purpose of the neighborhood park was as a place of assembly to discuss community issues. Chicago has a long storied history of public speeches both for entertainment and educational purposes. Daniel Burnham's March 27, 1897 lecture for the Commercial Club of Chicago inspired the club to provide $80,000 to publish the Burnham Plan.

Washington Square Park has been the geographic center of Chicago public speeches. By the 1890s the park acquired its Bughouse Square moniker. From the 1910s to the mid-1960s, on warm-weather evenings soapbox orators waxed on topics ranging from gender relations to Communism. Like Speakers' Corner in London's Hyde Park, Washington Square became a popular spot for artists, writers, political radicals, and hobos to pontificate, lecture, recite poetry, rant and rave. A group of regulars formed "The Dill Pickle Club," devoted to free expression. For years Washington Square orators appointed their own honorary "king." In its heyday in the 1920s and 1930s, revolutionary left soapboxers were occasionally joined by poets, religionists, and cranks. In 1959, the city transferred Washington Square to the Chicago Park District. In 1964, Life featured an article saying that it was a meeting place for cottaging among homosexuals. Six years later, it played host to Chicago's first Gay Pride March.

== Washington Square Historic District ==
- Washington Square Historic District
- U.S. National Register of Historic Places
- U.S. Historic district
- Location within Chicago metropolitan area Location within Illinois Location within the United States
- Location: Washington Square, N. Dearborn St., from W. Walton St. to W. Chicago Ave., Chicago, Illinois
- Coordinates: 41°53′56″N 87°37′49″W
- Built: 1842
- Architect: Cobb, Henry Ives; et al.
- Architectural style: Italianate, Queen Anne
- MPS: Land Subdivisions with Set-Aside Parks, Chicago, IL MPS
- NRHP reference No.: 03000786
- Added to NRHP: August 21, 2003

Washington Square Historic District is a historic district that includes Washington Square Park. The district was listed on the National Register of Historic Places on August 21, 2003. The Washington Square District was declared a Chicago Landmark on May 16, 1990. The original 1990 Washington Square Park District Chicago Landmark designation included the park, Newberry Library, 60 West Walton Street and 915 to 929 North Dearborn Street. The first Chicago Landmark district extension on July 10, 2002 included 22-28 and 27-31 West Chestnut Street and 802-818, 827-867, 1012, 1023-1029, and 1150-1154 North Dearborn Street. The May 11, 2005 extension added the Isaac Maynard Row Houses located at 119-123 West Delaware Place. The National Register of Historic Places included Washington Square as well as North Dearborn Street from West Walton Street to West Chicago Avenue.

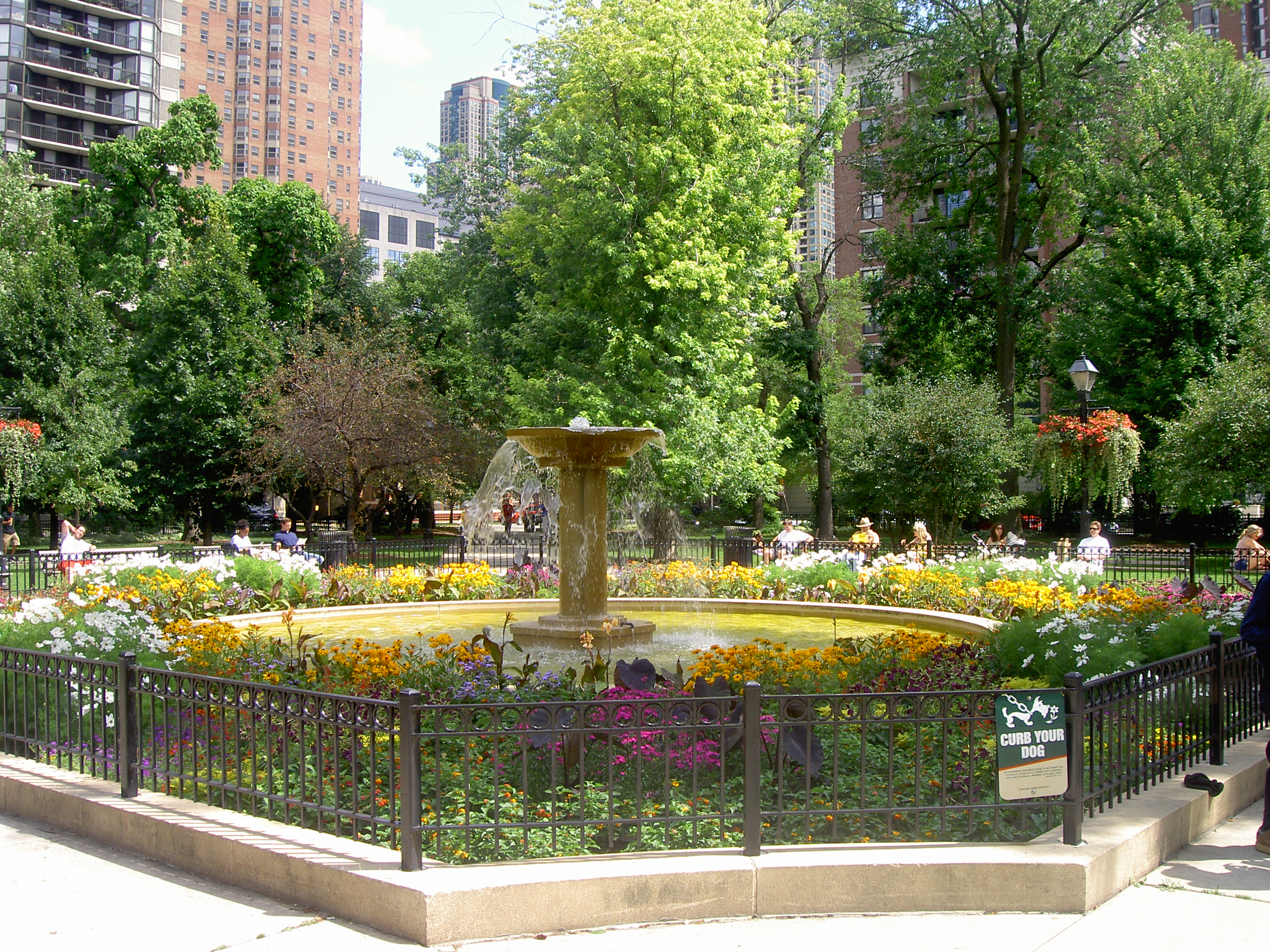
The restored fountain at the center of the park.

From 1986 to 2021, the square hosted the annual Bughouse Square Debates free speech gathering in conjunction with the Newberry Library's annual book sale. Bughouse Square Debates were part of an annual festival to recreate the atmosphere of speeches and debates by soap box orators that once flourished in the park.

Although Alderman McCormick's fountain was removed in the 1970s, in the late 1990s, the park district, the city, and neighborhood organizations agreed on a restoration plan for Washington Square. Improvements include a reconstructed historic fountain, period lighting, fencing, and new plantings. In the west part of the park, there is a memorial tablet designating the park as "Chicago's Premier Free Speech Forum."

== Related sites ==
- Jack Jones's Dill Pickle Club, also known as the indoor Bughouse Square.
- Washington Park forum, also known as the Bug Club.
