= Washington (name) =

Washington (/ˈwɒʃɪŋtən/) is a male given name and a surname. It most frequently refers to George Washington (1732–1799), the first president of the United States of America.

== Origin and dissemination ==
"Washington" is a name of origin and refers to place names in England, such as Washington, Tyne and Wear, from which the ancestors of George Washington are said to have come.

The word became a surname in 1183 when William de Hertburn took the name William de Wassyngtona. In 1657, the name came to Virginia. It later gained prominence due to General (later president) George Washington from the Washington family. In addition to the genealogical origin and spread of the surname, it was also (as with Abraham Lincoln and other persons associated with abolition of slavery in America) a favored assumed surname of freed slaves and thus a widely spread surname among the black population of the United States.

Washington as a male given name is derived from the surname. It is particularly popular in the United States and South America, evoking the memory of George Washington.

== Family name ==
Washington
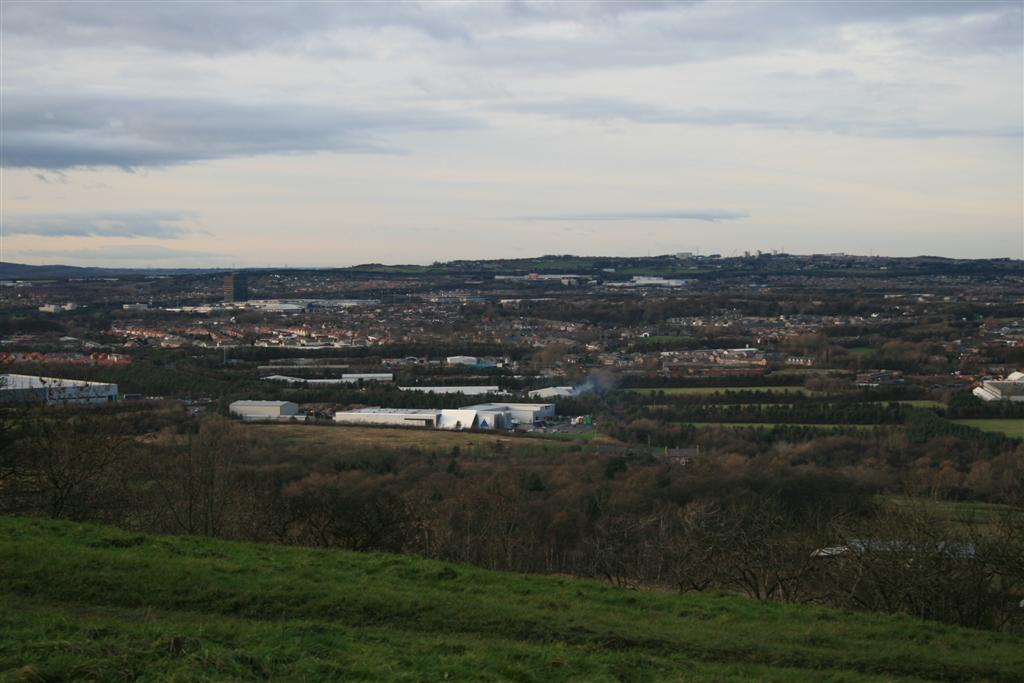
- Washington, Tyne and Wear, England

Origin
- Meaning: Derived from the English place name
- Region of origin: England

- George Washington (1732–1799), American general and statesman; first president of the United States (1789–1797)
  - George Washington (name), homonyms
- Adolphus Washington (born 1994), American football player
- Ar'Darius Washington (born 1999), American football player
- Arthur Lee Washington Jr. (born 1949, disappeared 1989), American fugitive
- Augustine Washington (1694–1743), Virginian planter, father of George Washington
- Bobby Washington (born 1947), American basketball player
- Booker T. Washington (1856–1915), American civil rights leader, educator and author
- Broderick Washington Jr. (born 1997), American football player
- Bryce Washington (born 1996), American basketball player for Hapoel Galil Elyon of the Israeli Basketball Premier League
- Bryson Washington, American football player
- Bushrod Washington (1762–1829), American judge
- Carlos Washington Jr. (born 1999), American football player
- Casey Washington (born 2001), American football player
- Charles Washington (disambiguation), multiple people
- Claudell Washington (1954–2020), American baseball player
- Conor Washington (born 1992), Northern Irish footballer
- Craig Anthony Washington (born 1941), American politician
- Cullen Washington Jr. (born 1972) American painter
- Darius Washington Jr. (born 1985), Macedonian-American basketball player
- Darius Washington (Canadian football) (born 2000), American football player
- Darnell Washington (born 2001), American football player
- Darnell Keith Washington (born 1988), American criminal
- Daryl Washington (born 1986), American football player
- Dennis Washington (born 1934), American businessman
- Denzel Washington (born 1954), American actor
- Dinah Washington (1924–1963), American singer
- Dewayne Washington (born 1972), American football player
- Elliot Washington II (born 2003), American football player
- Eric Washington (disambiguation), multiple people
- Fredi Washington (1903–1994), American actress
- Geno Washington (born 1943), American singer
- Grover Washington Jr. (1943–1999), American jazz saxophonist
- Haleigh Washington (born 1995), American Olympic volleyball player
- Harold Washington (1922–1987), American politician
- Henry Stephens Washington (1867–1934), American geologist
- Herb Washington (born 1951), American sprinter and baseball player
- Howard Washington (born 1998), American-Canadian basketball player
- Isaiah Washington (born 1963), American actor
- Jack Washington (1910–1964), American jazz saxophonist
- Jakob von Washington (1778–1848), Bavarian Army general
- James Washington (wide receiver) (born 1996), American football player
- Jason Washington (born 1979), American football coach
- Jay Washington (born 1981), Filipino-American basketball player
- Jett Washington (born 2007), American football player
- Joe Washington (born 1953), American football player
- John David Washington (born 1984), American football player
- John P. Washington (1908–1943), Roman Catholic priest and lieutenant in the US Army
- John Washington (disambiguation), multiple people
- Justine Washington (born 1940), American singer
- Kamasi Washington (born 1981), American jazz saxophonist
- Karen Washington, American political activist and community organizer
- Katherine Washington (1933–2019), American women's basketball player
- Keith Washington (born 1960), American singer
- Kelley Washington (born 1979), American football player
- Kenneth Washington (1946–2025), American actor
- Kenny Washington (basketball), American basketball player and coach
- Kermit Washington (born 1951), American basketball player
- Kerry Washington (born 1977), American actress
- Lawrence Washington (1602–1652), English rector, great-great-grandfather of George Washington
- Lawrence Washington (1659–1698), Virginian planter, grandfather of George Washington
- Lawrence Washington (1718–1752), Virginian soldier, half-brother of George Washington
- L'Damian Washington (born 1991), American football player
- Leona Ford Washington (1928–2007), Texas community activist
- Lorenzo Washington (1986–2021), American football player
- Lucy Hall Washington (1835–1913), American poet and social reformer
- Lynneice Washington, American lawyer and district attorney
- Martha Washington (1731–1802), American first lady, wife of George Washington
- Malik Washington (born 2001), American football player
- MaliVai Washington (born 1969), American tennis player
- Mashona Washington (born 1976), American tennis player
- McKinley Washington Jr. (1936–2022), American minister and politician
- Megan Washington (born 1986), Australian singer-songwriter
- Mike Washington (disambiguation), multiple people
- Montrell Washington (born 1999), American football player
- Ned Washington (1901–1976), American lyricist
- Parker Washington (born 2002), American football player
- Patrice Washington (born 1961), Bahamian airplane pilot
- P. J. Washington (born 1998), American basketball player
- Regina Washington, American public health professional, activist and researcher
- Richard Washington (born 1955), American basketball player
- Rico Washington (born 1978), American baseball player
- Robert Washington (disambiguation), multiple people
- Ron Washington (born 1952), American baseball manager and player
- Ronnie Washington (born 1963), American football player
- Sabrina Washington (born 1978), British singer-songwriter
- Saddi Washington (born 1975), American basketball player and coach
- Savion Washington (born 2002), American football player
- Scotty Washington (born 1997), American football player
- Susannah Sarah Washington (1816–1890), American political hostess
- Sydnee Washington (born 1989), American comedian
- Sydney Magruder Washington, American ballet dancer
- Tahj Washington (born 2001), American football player
- Taylor Washington (born 1993), American soccer player
- Tonya Washington (born 1977), American basketball player
- Tyree Washington (born 1976), American sprinter
- TyTy Washington Jr. (born 2001), American basketball player
- U. L. Washington (1953–2024), American baseball player
- Walter Washington (1915–2003), American politician
- William Washington (1752–1810), American soldier
- William D. Washington (1833–1870), American painter
- William Henry Washington (1813–1860), American politician
- Woodi Washington (born 2000), American football player

== Given name ==
- Washington Abdala (born 1959), Uruguayan politician
- Washington Sebastián Abreu (born 1976), Uruguayan football player
- Washington Adams (1814–1883), justice of the Supreme Court of Missouri
- Washington Bandeira (born 1984), Brazilian politician
- Washington Barrow (1807–1866), American politician
- Washington Bartlett (1824–1887), American politician
- Washington Beltrán Barbat (1885–1920), Uruguayan politician
- Washington Beltrán (1914–2003), Uruguayan politician, son of the former
- Washington Benavides (1930–2017), Uruguayan poet and musician
- Washington Brandão (born 1990), Brazilian football player
- Washington Bushnell (1825–1885), American politician
- Washington Stecanela Cerqueira (born 1975), Brazilian football player
- Washington Irving Chambers (1856–1934), US Navy officer
- Washington Cook (1873–1955), American politician
- Washington Duke (1820–1905), American industrialist
- Washington Gardner (1845–1928), American politician
- Washington Dorsey Gibbs (1839–1915), American politician
- Washington Ritter Harrison (1849–1888), American baseball player
- Washington Hunt (1811–1867), American politician and 17th governor of New York
- Washington Irving (1783–1859), American author
- Washington Iza (born 1947), Ecuadorian artist
- Washington Jones (1925–1987), American boxer
- Washington Ellsworth Lindsey (1862–1926), American politician and 3rd governor of New Mexico
- Washington Luís (1869–1957), the 13th President of Brazil
- Washington J. McCormick (1884–1949), American politician
- Washington Muzzy (1828–1898), American farmer and politician
- Washington J. Oglesby (1859–1902), American lawyer, an early Black lawyer in California
- Washington Olivera (born 1954), Uruguayan coach and former footballer
- Washington Poe (1800–1876), American politician
- Washington Roebling (1837–1926), American civil engineer
- Washington César Santos (1960–2014), Brazilian football player
- Washington Silva (disambiguation), several people
- Washington Irving Stineman (1869–1947), American politician from Pennsylvania
- Washington Sundar (born 1999), Indian cricketer
- Washington Tais (born 1972), Uruguayan footballer
- Washington C. Whitthorne (1825–1891), American politician
- Washington F. Willcox (1834–1909), American politician

== See also ==
- Washington (disambiguation), other meanings including place names (in modern times, mostly named after George Washington)
- All pages beginning with Washington
