= Washington Park (Chicago park) =

Public park in Chicago, Illinois

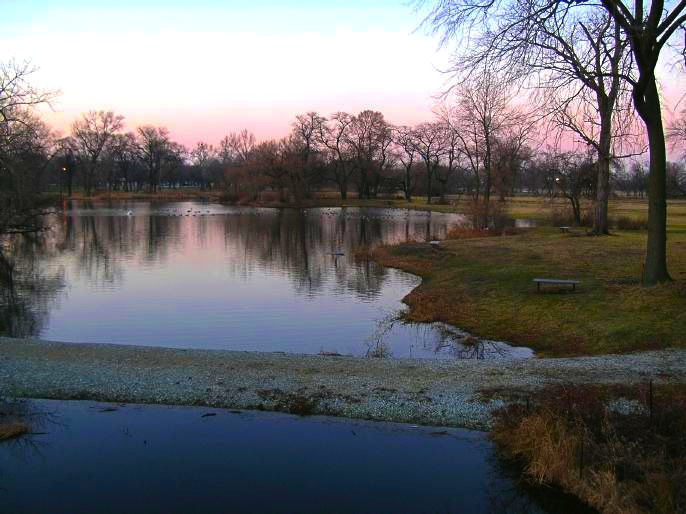
- Pond in Washington Park
- Interactive map of Washington Park
- Type: Urban park
- Location: 5531 S. King Drive, Chicago, Illinois
- Coordinates: 41°47′45″N 87°36′40″W
- Area: 380 acres (1.5 km^{2})
- Created: 1870; 156 years ago
- Operator: Chicago Park District
- Washington Park
- U.S. National Register of Historic Places
- U.S. Historic district
- Architects: Olmsted, Frederick Law; Burnham, Daniel H.
- Architectural style: Beaux Arts, Art Deco
- MPS: Chicago Park District MPS
- NRHP reference No.: 04000871
- Added to NRHP: August 20, 2004

Washington Park (formerly Western Division of South Park, also Park No. 21) is a 372-acre (1.5 km^{2}) park between Cottage Grove Avenue and Martin Luther King Drive, (originally known as "Grand Boulevard") located at 5531 S. Martin Luther King Dr. in the Washington Park community area on the South Side of Chicago. It was named for President George Washington in 1880. Washington Park is the largest of four Chicago Park District parks named after persons surnamed Washington (the others are Dinah Washington Park, Harold Washington Park and Washington Square Park, Chicago). Located in the park is the DuSable Museum of African American History. This park was the proposed site of the Olympic Stadium and the Olympic swimming venue for Chicago's bid to host the 2016 Summer Olympics. Washington Park was added to the National Register of Historic Places on August 20, 2004.

== Planning ==
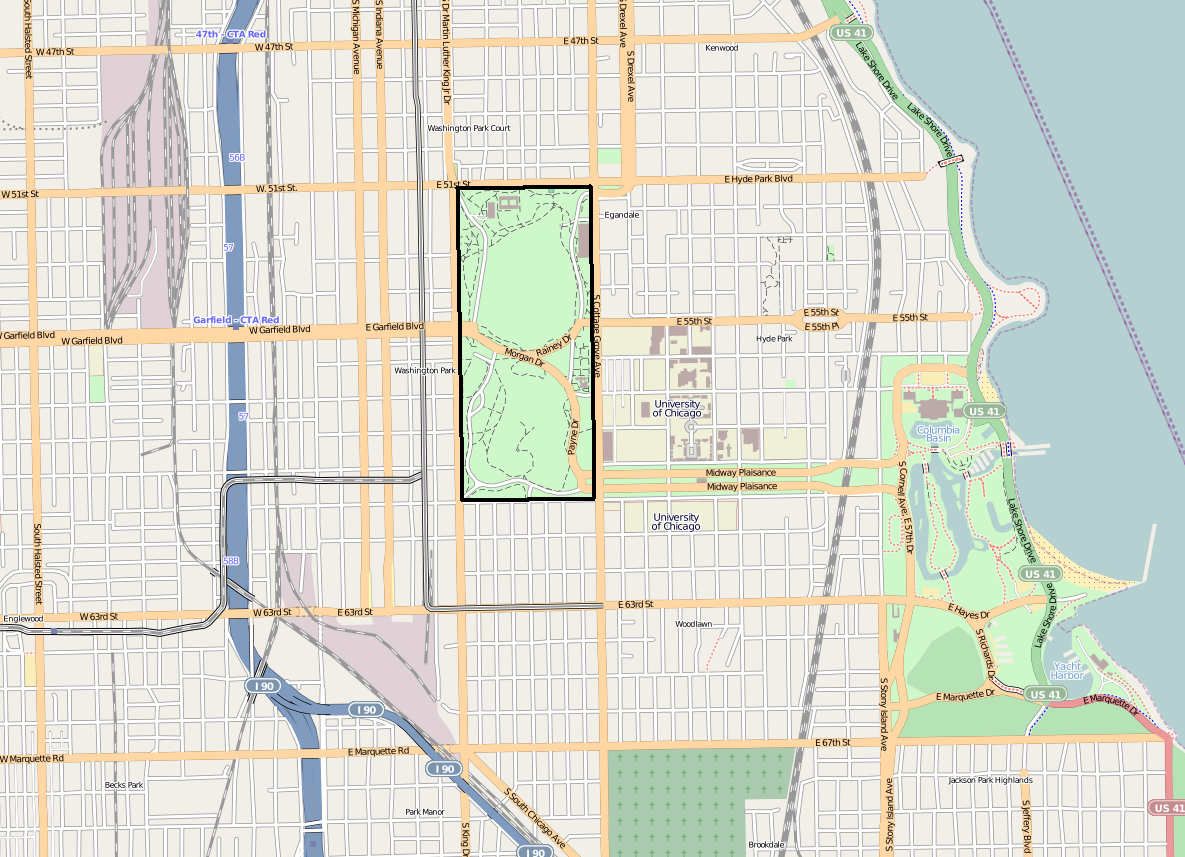
Map of Washington park in the South Side of Chicago

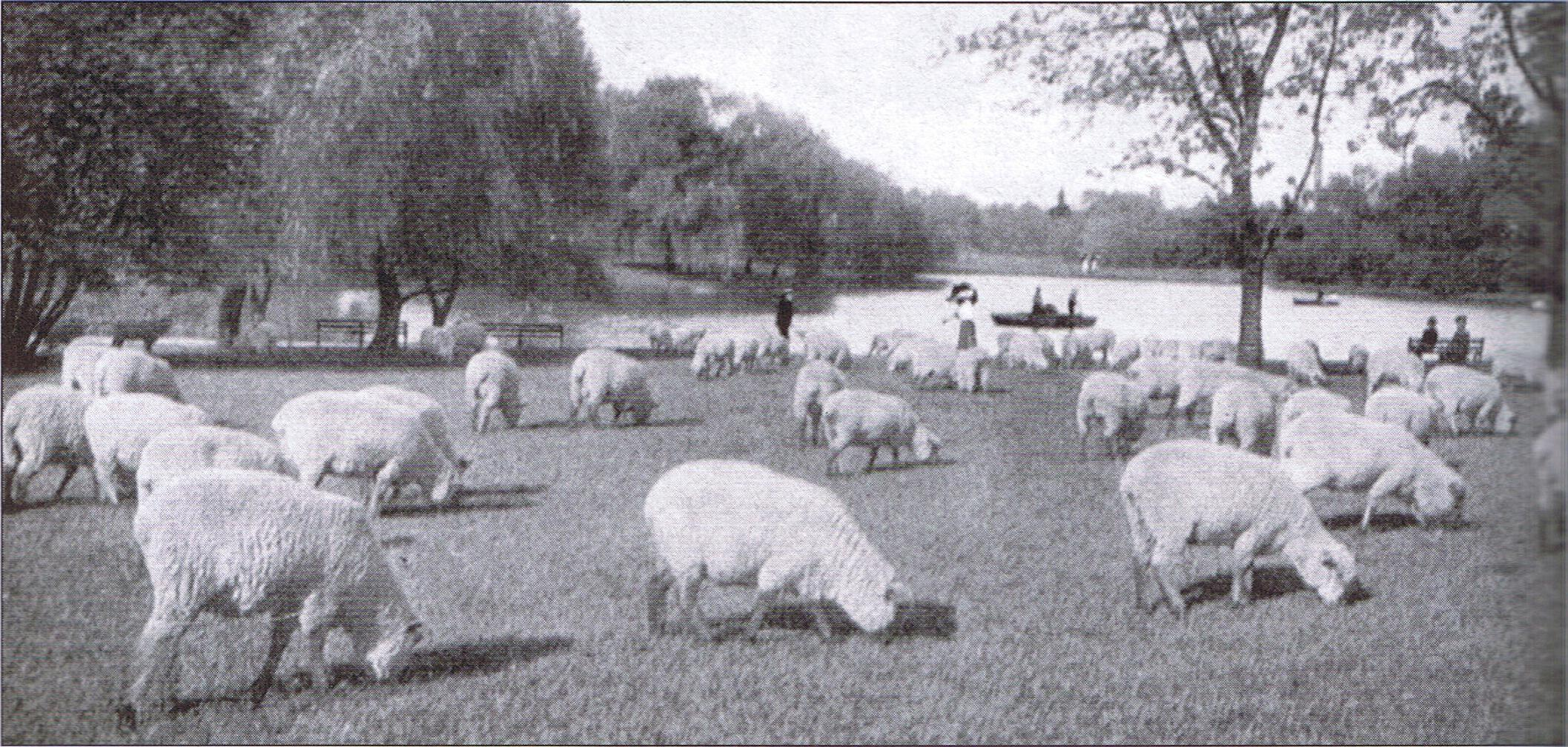
Southdown sheep grazing before they were disallowed circa 1920

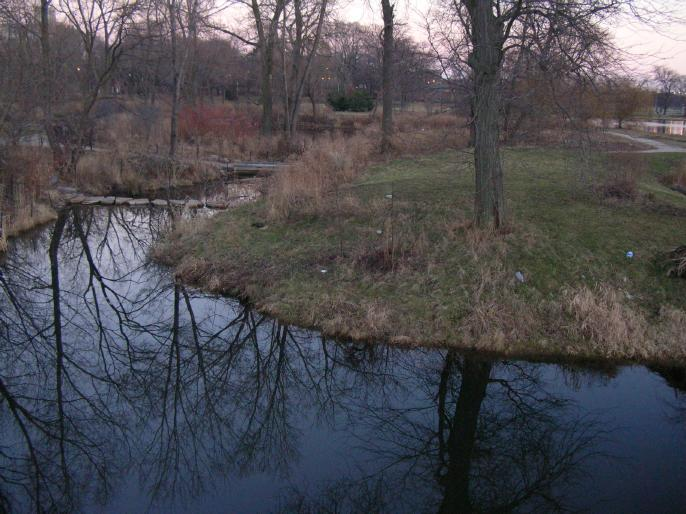
Lagoon in Washington Park

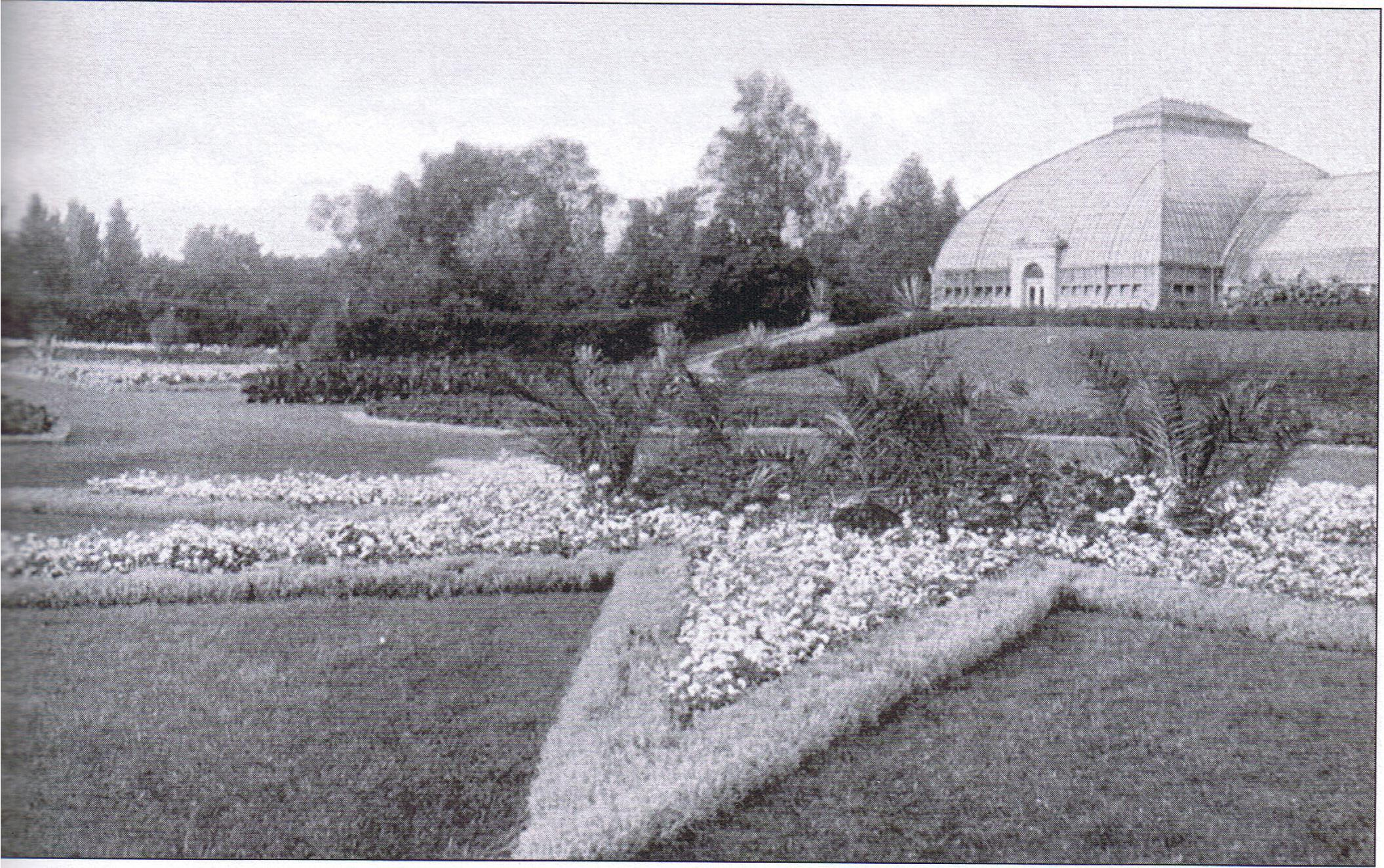
Washington Park Conservatory

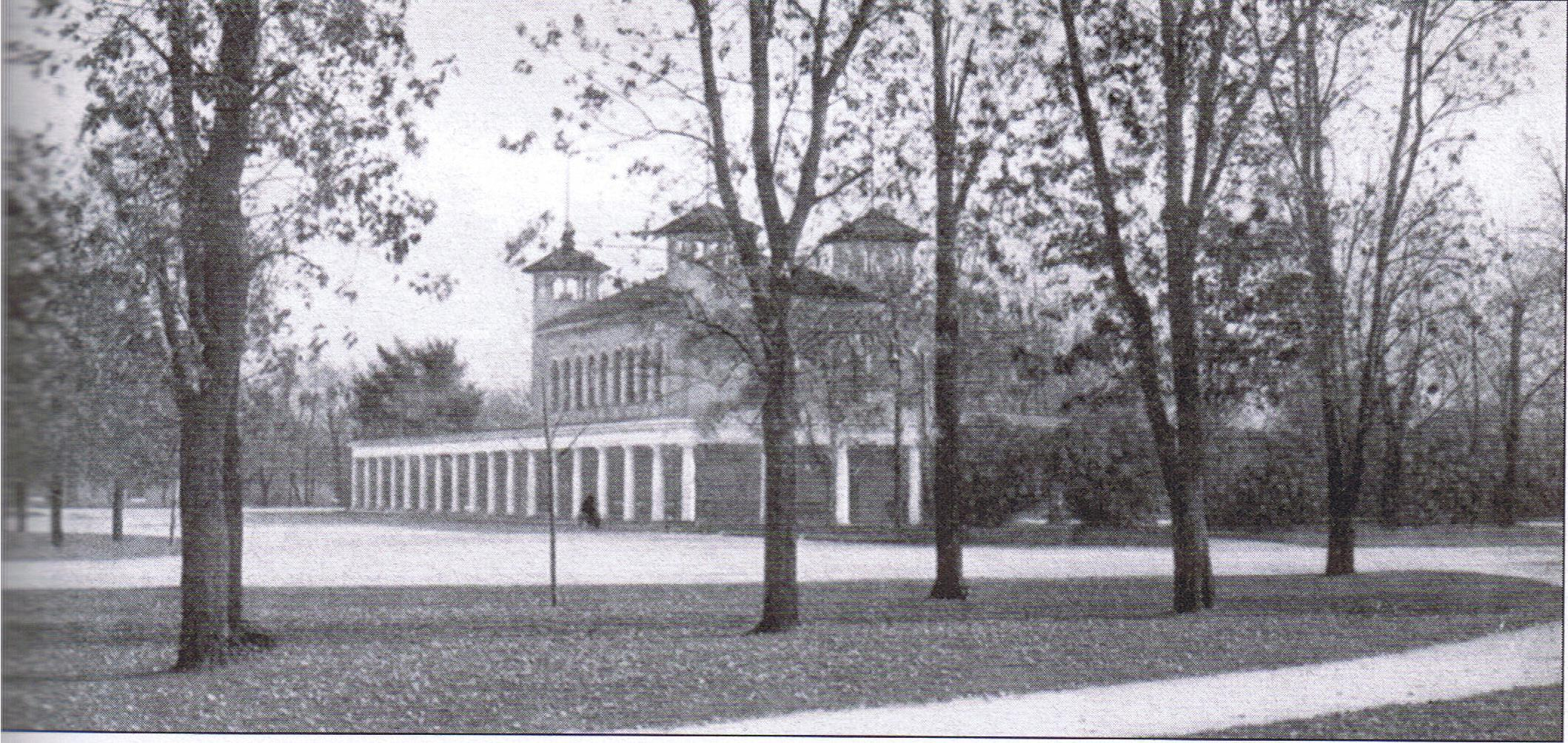
Washington Park Refectory

Washington Park was conceived by Paul Cornell, a Chicago real estate magnate who had founded the adjoining town of Hyde Park. Cornell had lobbied the Illinois General Assembly to establish the South Park Commission. After his efforts succeeded in 1869, the South Park Board of Commissioners identified more than 1,000 acres (4.0 km^{2}) south of Chicago for a large park and boulevards that would connect it with downtown and the extant West Park System. Originally called South Park, the property was composed of eastern and western divisions, now bearing the names Jackson and Washington Parks and the Midway Plaisance. Cornell hired Frederick Law Olmsted and his partner, Calvert Vaux, to lay out the park in the 1870s. Their blueprints were destroyed in the Great Chicago Fire of 1871.

When Olmsted first examined the property, he saw a field filled with bare trees and decided to maintain its character by creating a meadow surrounded by trees. His plan for the park called for sheep to graze as a means of keeping the grass short. Cornell convinced Olmsted to include sporting areas, although Olmsted wanted a more natural feel to the park, which included a 13-acre (53,000 m^{2}) lake. The Western division was renamed Washington Park in 1881.

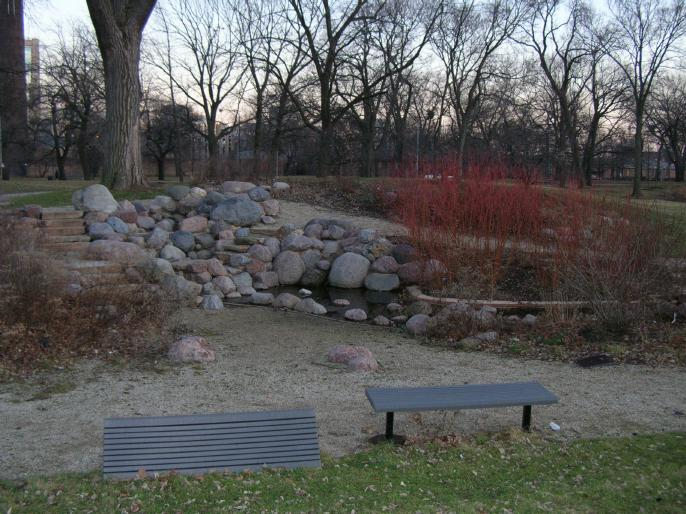
Rock garden in Washington Park

Olmsted designed the park to have two broad boulevards cutting through it, making it part of the Chicago boulevard system. From Washington Park, one can take the Midway east to Jackson Park, Garfield Boulevard west to Chicago Midway International Airport, or Drexel Boulevard north to the central city.

== Construction ==
Horace William Shaler Cleveland executed the plans within the limitations of the financial setbacks from the fire (including the loss of tax rolls) and the 1873 depression. Olmsted's vision for Washington Park was generally realized. However, spending for the park was diverted after the Great Chicago Fire in 1871. The loss of financial backing and difficulty in levying taxes after the fire meant that a water park could not be built on the property. From 1897 until the 1930s the park housed an impressive conservatory and ornate sunken garden designed by D. H. Burnham & Co. at 56th Street and Cottage Grove. The Washington Park Conservatory, like those of other city parks such as Humboldt and Douglas Parks, was torn down in the 1930s due to limited resources as a result of the Great Depression. This left Lincoln Park and Garfield Park as Chicago's main Conservatories.

One of the earliest improvements was the "South Open Green", a pastoral meadow with grazing sheep, also used as a ball field. Architect Daniel H. Burnham's firm designed the 1880 limestone round stables, the 1881 refectory, and the 1910 administrative headquarters for the South Park Commission. Other early attractions to the park included riding stables, cricket grounds, baseball fields, a toboggan slide, archery ranges, a golf course, Swimming pool, bicycle paths, row boats, horseshoe pits, greenhouses, a rose garden, a bandstand, a small zoo featuring six alligators, and a lily pond. The lily pond (pictured left) was a particularly enticing attraction because few had seen such a site. Today, the administrative building houses DuSable Museum of African American History. The park has retained its environmental appeal with continuing visionary support of the Burnham Plan which supported the maintenance of a park system.

== Usage ==
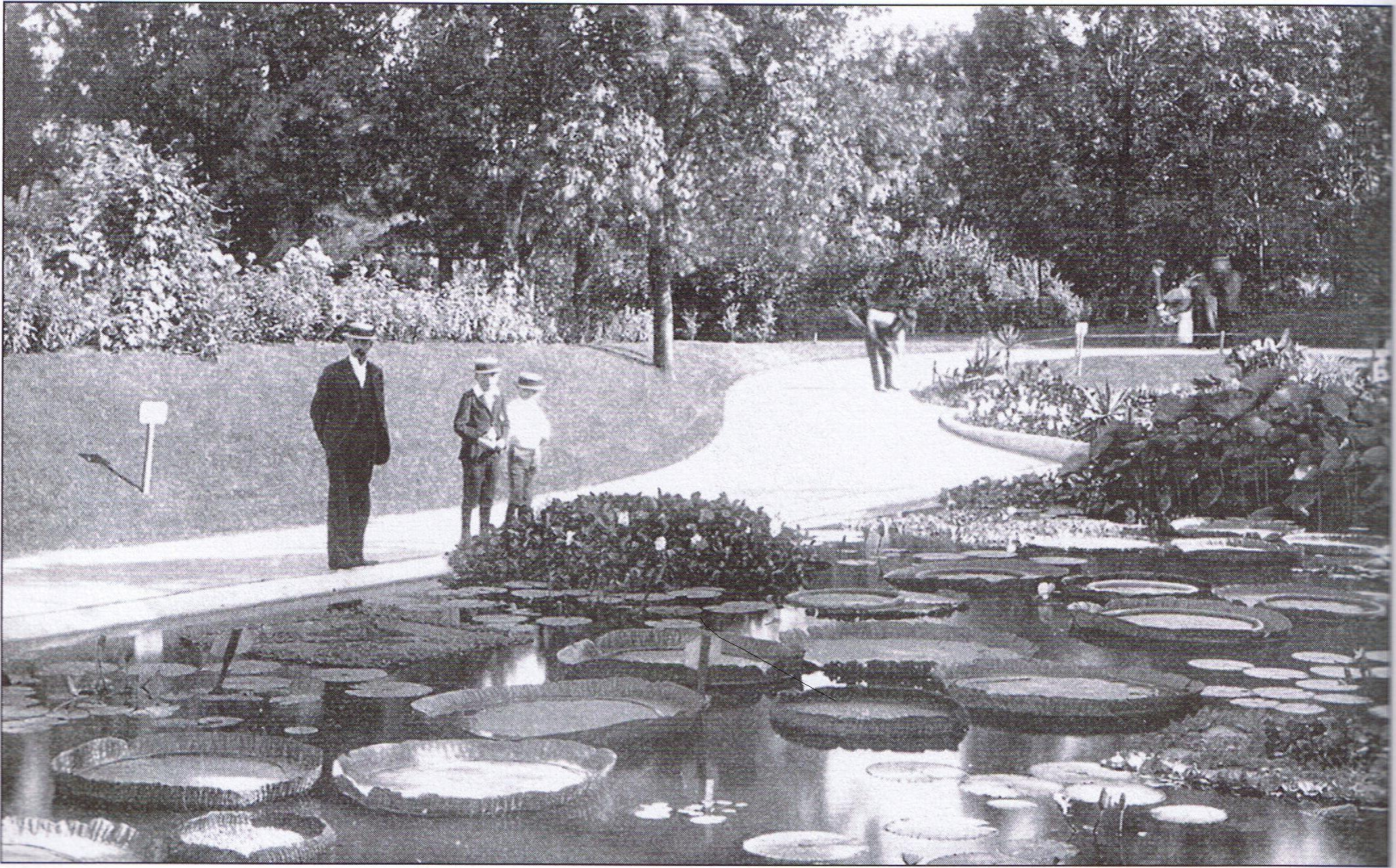
Washington Park Lily Pond

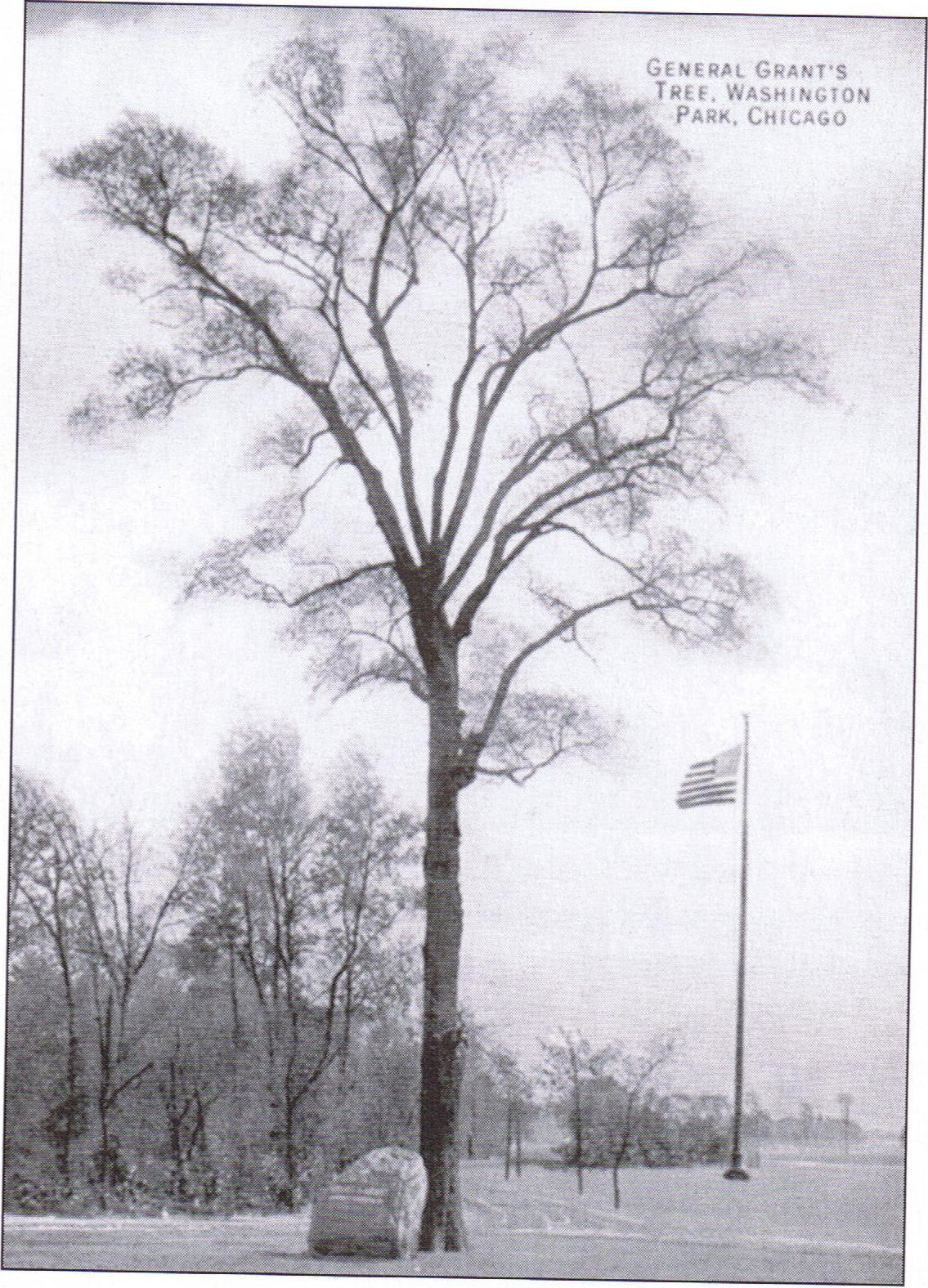
General Grant's Tree

On December 6, 1879, former U.S. President Ulysses Grant took part in a tree planting ceremony in the park. A memorial boulder with a plaque (only the boulder remains today)) commemorated the event. In the 1920s black semiprofessional baseball teams played at Washington Park. George Lott began playing tennis at the park.

At the southeast corner of the park, at 61st and Cottage Grove, Washington Park Race Track operated between 1883 and 1905. It was one of the largest and grandest horse racetracks of its time. A nine-hole golf course was built in the infield and several of its buildings survive today as part of the Park District. This includes the stables used by Chicago Police at 58th and Cottage Grove. The racetrack closed after Illinois outlawed gambling, and the name was transferred to a second track in Homewood, Illinois.

The USA Cross Country Championships were held in the park in 1933, 1957, 1958, 1962, 1963, 1964, 1967, 1970 and 1972.

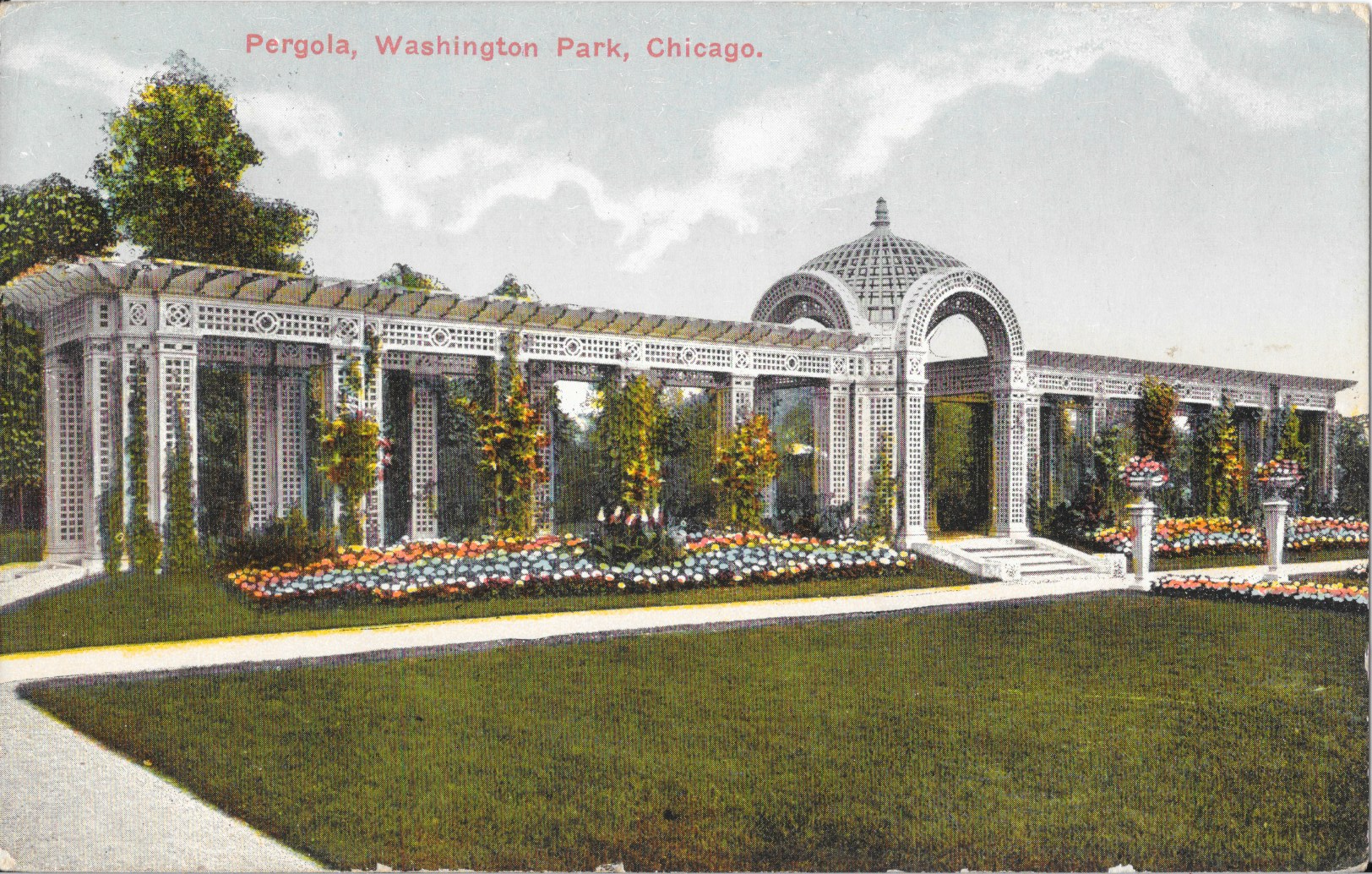
Pergola circa 1916

Washington Park was a site of tension and conflict arising from the demographic changes resulting from the African American expansion into the neighborhood in the period following the First World War. The park has since 1961 hosted the DuSable Museum of African American History, a leader in the promotion of the history, art and culture of African American heritage.

=== 2016 Olympic bid ===
On September 21, 2006, Mayor Richard M. Daley announced that an Olympic Stadium was being proposed for Washington Park as part of Chicago's bid for the 2016 Summer Olympics (The International Olympic Committee requires cities have a dome with a seating capacity of at least 80,000 in order to be considered as summer Olympics hosts). The stadium would have seated 95,000 initially for the games, and would have been converted to a 10,000-seat below-ground arena for track-and-field and cultural events after the Olympics. The cost was estimated to be at least US$300–400 million. The plan replaced the initial dual stadium opening ceremony facility.

Additional details about the plan included new permanent hockey fields, use of Jones Armory, and new pedestrian juncture between the two halves of the park by tunneling part of Morgan Drive (55th). A later December 2008 plan added the olympic swimming venue to the park. The plan faced opposition from those holding the view that Washington Park's listing on the National Register of Historic Places could not have survived the execution of this Olympic plan. In addition to the opposition, the plan faced constraints because of the park's landmark status, which precluded federal money from being used to build a temporary stadium in the park. The October 2009 decision to award the 2016 Summer Games to Rio de Janeiro halted these plans.

== Today ==
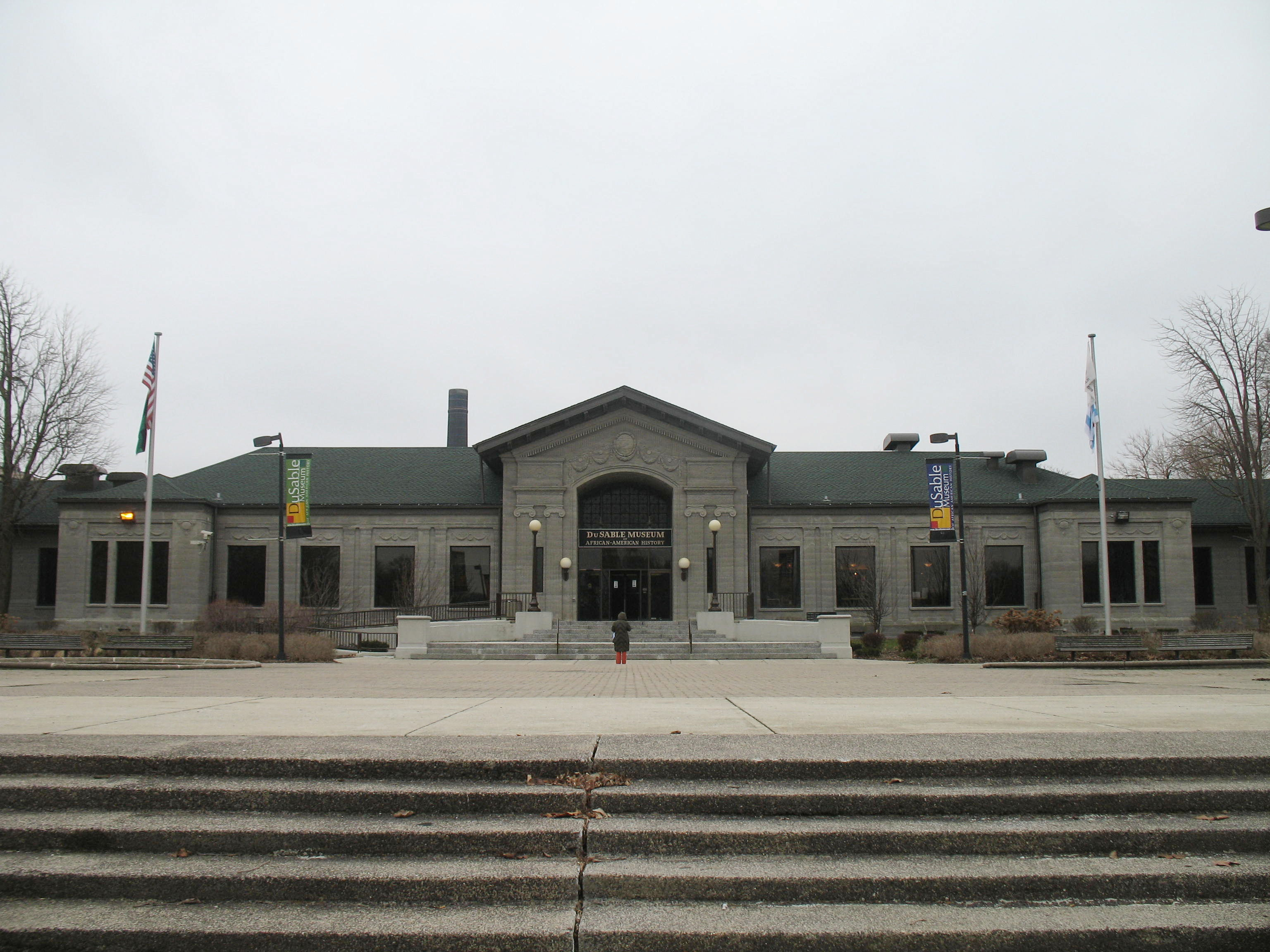
DuSable Museum, January 7, 2007

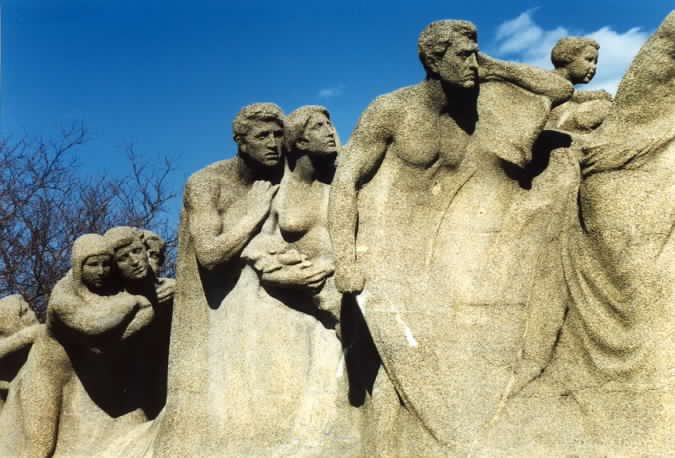
Fountain of Time

Washington Park is listed on the National Register of Historic Places as a United States Registered Historic District. Its National Register of Historic Places Multiple Property Submission consisted of 3,670 acres (14.9 km^{2}) containing 15 contributing buildings, 28 contributing structures, and 8 contributing objects. Interesting sights in the Park include the DuSable Museum of African American History and its sculpture garden, the Lorado Taft sculpture Fountain of Time, and an architecturally distinctive National Guard armory. Washington Park is a social center of the South Side and hosts many festivals in the summer, including Chicago's best organized cricket league and the terminus of the Bud Billiken Parade and Picnic. It is also the host of the annual UniverSoul Circus which comes to the park each fall (its first performance at the park was 1996). The largest 16" softball league in Chicago is played there on Sundays (called "Sunday's Best Softball League"). There are 34 teams who play on 13 diamonds. There is also a weekday evening league.
