= Malfew Seklew =

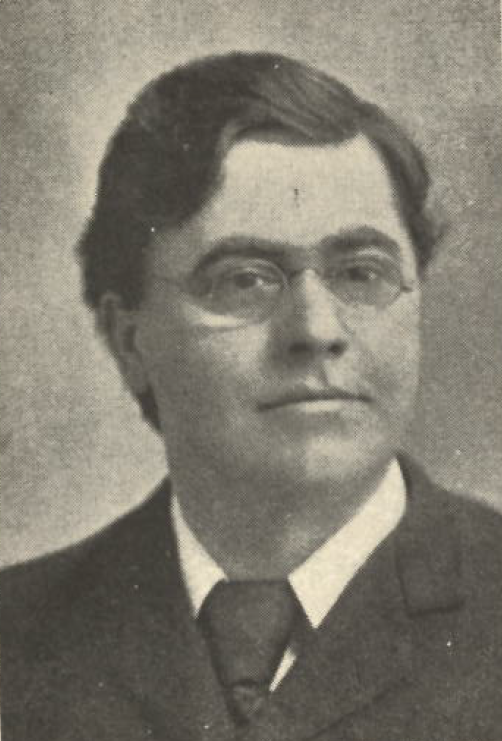
Seklew, in about 1900

Malfew Seklew (1863 – 9 February 1938) was a British Nietzschean known for his promotion of Egoism, particularly in the United States.

== Biography ==
Born in Sheffield in England, as Fred M. Wilkes, his father was a wealthy brewer. He became a clerk at the Nottingham Journal, where he claimed to have worked alongside J. M. Barrie. He became a supporter of first Fabianism, and then anarchism, and claimed to have worked for the newspaper of Kropotkin for a time. He then developed an interest in the work of Friedrich Nietzsche and fused this with his other beliefs, creating what he termed an "Egoist-Materialist-Libertarian-Socialist School"; later, he coined the shorter term, "Athegoism". He claimed that this combined socialist economics with anarchist politics, ideas from the Social Democratic Federation, science in general, and the work of Nietzsche. Though, later in life he would become a capitalist in economics and would be critical of socialism and communism.

Wilkes moved to New York City in 1885, where he began propounded his ideas in street corner speeches. Although he attracted few supporters, his fluent speeches and apparent familiarity with many prominent figures, ensured he attracted large groups to hear him speak. During this time, he adopted the name "Malfew Seklew", and claimed to have stood for Congress.

Seklew returned to the UK in about 1900, settling in Bradford. There, he worked with J. W. Gott on The Truthseeker, and later propounded his ideas in The Eagle and The Serpent, a journal of which he was associate editor, all while running the Chicago Lunch Bar. He moved to Chicago in 1916, where he became a regular speaker at the Dil Pickle Club. As many of the speakers there described themselves as "professors", he decided to invent a higher title, calling himself Sirfessor Wilkes Barre. He sold copies of a pamphlet, largely consisting of sayings of Mediaeval philosophers, entitled "The Gospel According to Malfew Seklew", and supplemented his income by selling other goods, such as cigarette holders. Seklew shared many of his ideas with Ragnar Redbeard, and the two shared a property for a time in the 1920s.

Seklew took part in a non-stop talking contest in New York in 1928. Although he dropped out on the second day, he attracted attention by describing himself as the "coiner of more new words than any man in the world", and as "transcending the wit of Shakespeare". Around this time, he relocated to the city, continuing to speak publicly, usually on Broadway. In 1934 he began squatting in a condemned property on First Avenue; he died in 1938.
