= East Park Towers =

Apartment building in Chicago, Illinois

- U.S. National Register of Historic Places
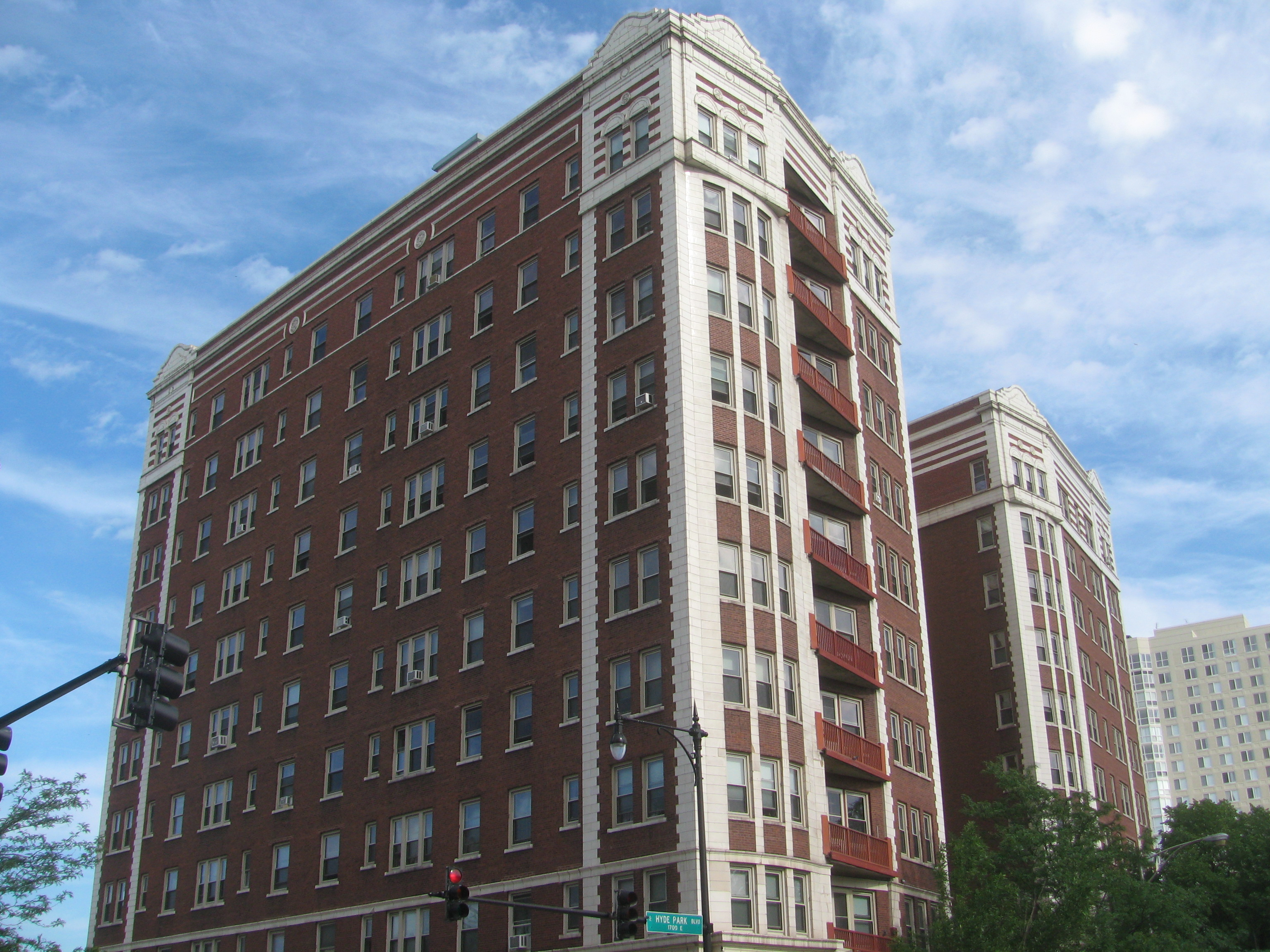

- Location within Chicago metropolitan area Location within Illinois Location within the United States
- Location: 5236--5252 S. Hyde Park Blvd., Chicago, Illinois
- Coordinates: 41°47′59″N 87°35′04″W
- Area: 0.4 acres (0.16 ha)
- Built: 1922-23
- Built by: Shelbourne Hotel Corp.
- Architect: Doerr, William P.
- Architectural style: Georgian Revival
- MPS: Hyde Park Apartment Hotels TR
- NRHP reference No.: 86001197
- Added to NRHP: May 14, 1986

The East Park Towers are a historic apartment building at 5236-5252 S. Hyde Park Boulevard in the Hyde Park neighborhood of Chicago, Illinois. The building was constructed in 1922-23 during a period of residential growth in Hyde Park. While it had no guest rooms, the apartments offered similar amenities to an apartment hotel, such as housekeeping service. Apartment hotels were popular as part-time housing for wealthy workers, as they combined the amenities of in-home service with the affordability of apartments, and the East Park Towers were one of several such apartments built in Hyde Park at the time. Architect William P. Doerr designed the building in the Georgian Revival style; his design included terra cotta belt courses and quoins and Palladian windows on the first floor.

The building was added to the National Register of Historic Places on May 14, 1986.
