= Robert Washington =

Robert Washington may refer to:

- Robert Washington (impersonator) (born 1958), American Elvis impersonator
- Robert Washington (basketball) (born 1977), American basketball player and coach
- Robert L. Washington III (1964–2012), American comic book writer

== See also ==
- Bobby Washington (born 1947), American basketball player
