= Eric Washington =

Eric Washington may refer to:

- Eric Washington (basketball) (born 1974), American basketball player
- Eric Washington (American football) (born 1969), American football coach
- Eric T. Washington (born 1953), District of Columbia judge
