= John Washington (disambiguation) =

John Washington (c. 1631–1677) was an English-American politician and great-grandfather of George Washington.

John or Johnny Washington may also refer to:

== Sports ==
=== American football ===
- John Washington (American football) (born 1963), American football defensive tackle
- John Washington or John Jefferson (American football) (born 1956), American football wide receiver
- John David Washington (born 1984), American actor and former football player

=== Baseball ===
- Johnny Washington (first baseman) (1916–1984), American baseball player
- Johnny Washington (pitcher) (born 1930), American baseball player
- Johnny Washington (baseball coach) (born 1984), American baseball coach

== Other ==
- John Wessington (died 1451), prior of Durham Abbey
- John Washington (Royal Navy officer) (1800–1863), British admiral and hydrographer
- John Augustine Washington (1736–1787), American politician and brother of George Washington
- John David Washington (born 1984), American actor and former football player
- John M. Washington (died 1853), U.S. artillery officer and military governor of New Mexico
- John M. Washington (slave) (1838–1918), American slave and memoirist
- John P. Washington (1908–1943), Roman Catholic priest, chaplain and U.S. Army officer
- John Thornton Augustine Washington (1783–1841), American politician and great-nephew of George Washington
