= Dill Pickle Club =

Club in Chicago

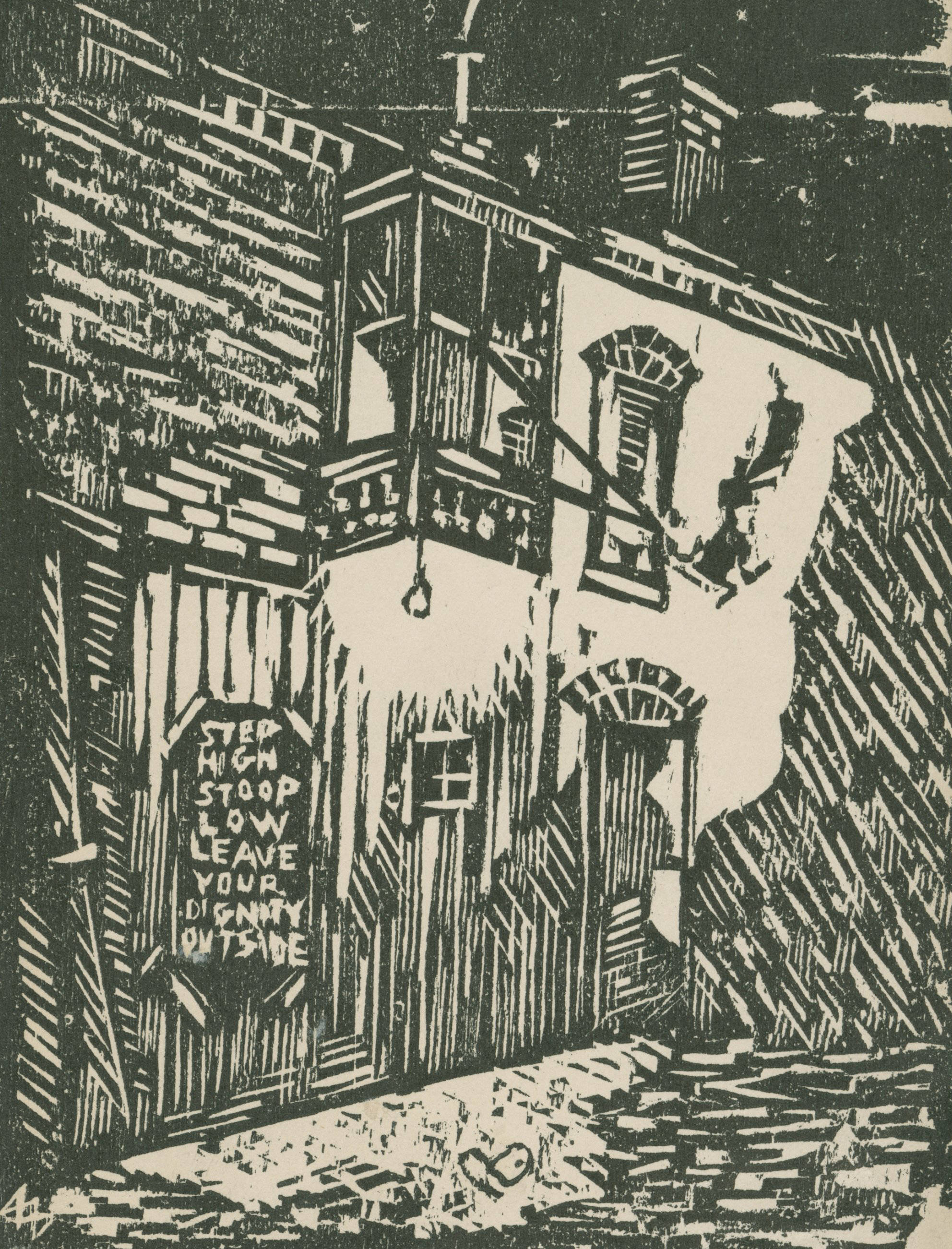
- Formation: 1914 (incorporated 1917)
- Founder: John "Jack" Jones
- Type: Bohemian club, Speakeasy, Theater, Social forum
- Headquarters: 18 Tooker Place (formerly Tooker Alley)
- Location: Near North Side, Chicago, Illinois, U.S.
- Key people: Ben Reitman; Jim Larkin; Elizabeth Gurley Flynn

The Dil Pickle Club (often spelled "Dill Pickle") was a Bohemian nightclub, forum, performance venue, and free-speech center in Chicago Illinois, active primarily from the mid-1910s through the early 1930s. Located in Tooker Alley near Washington Square Park ("Bughouse Square") in the city's Near North Side, the club became associated with Chicago's labor-radical, artistic, and "hobohemian" subcultures.

Founded by labor organizer John "Jack" Jones, a former member of the Industrial Workers of the World (IWW), the club hosted lectures, debates, poetry readings, theater productions, dances, and political discussions. Its audiences included labor organizers, professors, journalists, artists, hoboes, reformers, socialites, and political radicals.

The club became an important gathering place during the period sometimes called the Chicago Renaissance, attracting figures such as Carl Sandburg, Sherwood Anderson, Ben Hecht, Clarence Darrow, Emma Goldman, and Ben Reitman. Historians have also identified the club as an important site in the development of early queer social life and sexual discourse in Chicago.

Historian Franklin Rosemont described the Dil Pickle as "far and away the best-loved, most notorious, most stimulating, and most influential little gathering place in the city's history."

== History ==
=== Founding and Early Years ===
The Dill Pickle Club emerged from Chicago's labor-radical and free-speech culture of the 1910s. Its origins are generally traced to discussion forums associated with the Radical Bookshop on North Clark Street, operated by Howard and Lillian Udel, and to the soapbox-speaking culture of nearby Washington Square Park, popularly known as "Bughouse Square."

The club's founder, John "Jack" Jones, was a Canadian-born labor organizer associated with the Industrial Workers of the World (IWW) and a regular speaker at Bughouse Square. Around 1916 or 1917, Jones converted a barn at 18 Tooker Place, a narrow alley between Dearborn and State Streets on Chicago's Near North Side, into a meeting hall and performance venue. In 1917, the Dil Pickle Artisans were formally incorporated under Illinois nonprofit law to promote "arts, crafts, literature, and science."

Jones was joined by Irish labor organizer Jim Larkin and Dr. Ben Reitman, an anarchist physician, birth control advocate, and former manager of Emma Goldman's speaking tours. Reitman, already known for his "Hobo College" for migrant workers on Chicago's West Side, became one of the club's principal promoters and lecturers. Tobias Higbie later described the Dil Pickle as one of the best-documented examples of a Chicago bohemian forum linking artists, writers, musicians, and working-class activists.

=== Architecture and Atmosphere ===
Tucked into a narrow alley between Dearborn and State Streets, the entrance to the Dill Pickle Club was intentionally theatrical. The entrance was marked by a "DANGER" sign that which pointed to the orange main door which was lit by a green light. On the door, it read: "Step High, Stoop Low and Leave Your Dignity Outside." Once inside, another sign read "This club is established to elevate the minds of people to a lower level." Inside, the walls were adorned with murals, absurdist signage, poems, caricatures, and theatrical sets. The club featured a tearoom, a lending library, an art gallery, a cafe, and a lecture hall and ballroom with standing room for up to 700 guests.

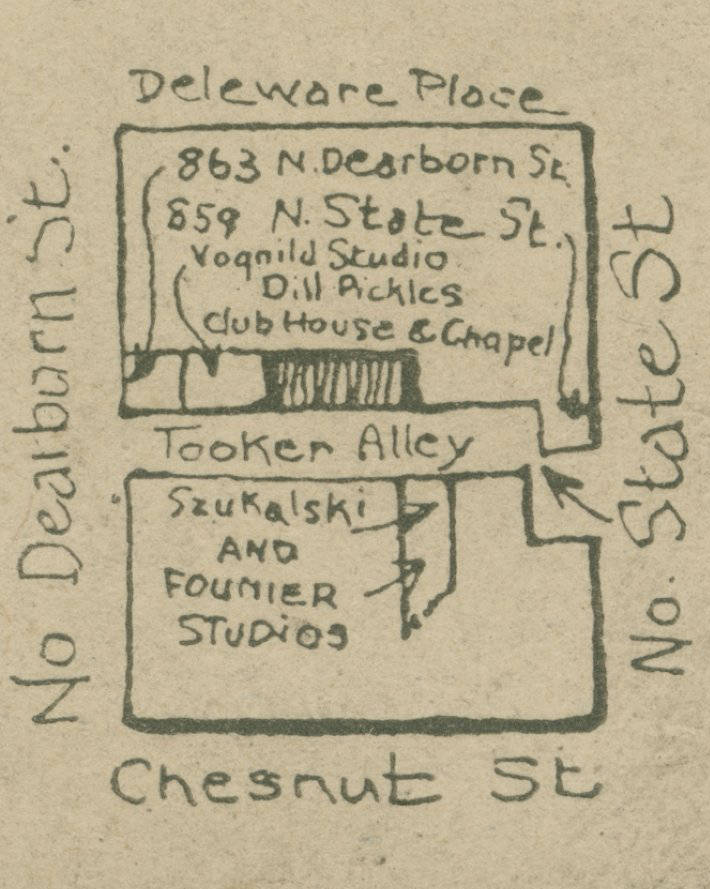
Map dated March 2, 1921 where the "Dill Pickle Club House and Chapel" located at "18 Tooker Alley" and across the alley was the studio of artist Stanislav Szukalski

== Activities and Events ==
=== Lectures and Debates ===
The Club's central function was to foster unfiltered discussion on taboo and progressive topics. Lectures bore cheeky titles such as "Should the Brownian movement Be Approached from the Rear?" Topics ranged from socialism, free love, atheism, and psychoanalysis to birth control, venereal disease, and homosexuality.

Speakers included figures such as Eugene Debs, Emma Goldman, Big Bill Haywood, Aimee Semple McPherson, Magnus Hirschfeld, and Clarence Darrow. At one debate, Ben Hecht proposed: "Resolved: That People Who Attend Literary Debates are Imbeciles," and won by simply pointing to the audience and resting his case. Another time, a German homosexual speaker drew a crowd of over 300--at a time when same-sex relations were criminalized nationwide.

Reitman himself often gave provocative talks such as "Satisfying Sex Needs Without Trouble" or "Favorite Methods of Suicide," drawing both applause and outrage.

=== Theatrical and Artistic Programs ===
The Dill Pickle Players, the Club's resident troupe, staged operas, jazz dances, poetry readings and one-act plays including works by Ibsen, Shaw, O'Neil, and Yeats, alongside local and original works. Performers ranged from university professors to strippers. One production featured actress Angela D'Amore playing Miss Julie; another staged Ezra Pound's translations of Japanese Noh plays.

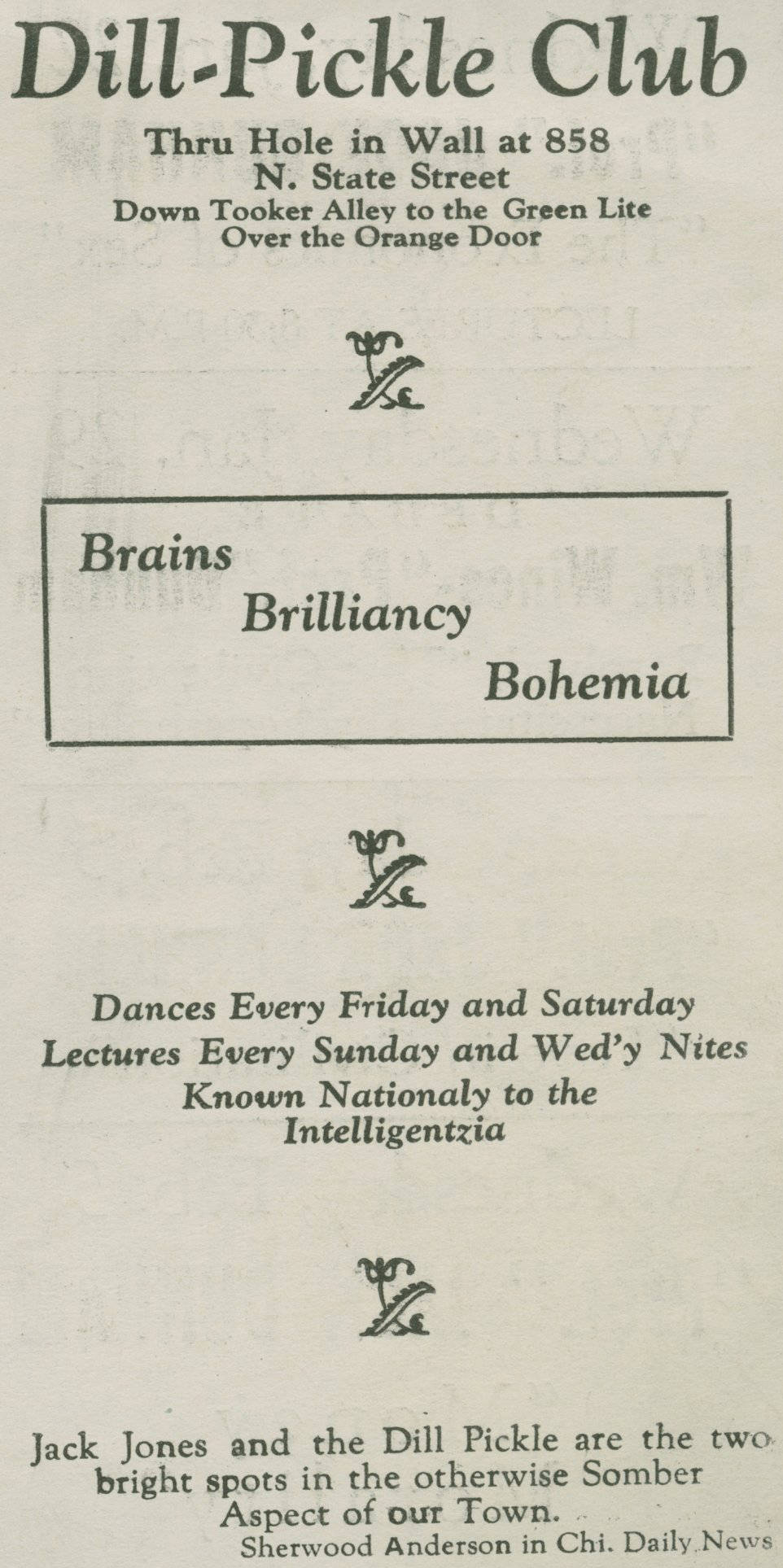
Through the Hole in Wall at 858 N. State Street Down Tooker Alley to the Green Lite Over the Orange Door"

Visual artists like Edgar Miller designed sets and flyers. Sunday poetry readings featured Carl Sandburg, Robert Frost, Vachel Lindsay, and others. Sandburg listed the Dill Pickle as his school on a payroll form, and Sherwood Anderson praised it as a place where "streetcar conductors sat beside professors."

=== Social and Queer Life ===
The Club was an important site for Chicago's early LGBT+ community. It hosted lectures on "The Third Sex" and talks by queer figures like Jack Ryan and Magnus Hirschfeld. Cross-dressing and masquerade balls were common, and the Pickle was noted for tolerating and welcoming homosexuality, even as mainstream society criminalized it. The atmosphere allowed expressions of gender and sexuality rarely accepted elsewhere in public.

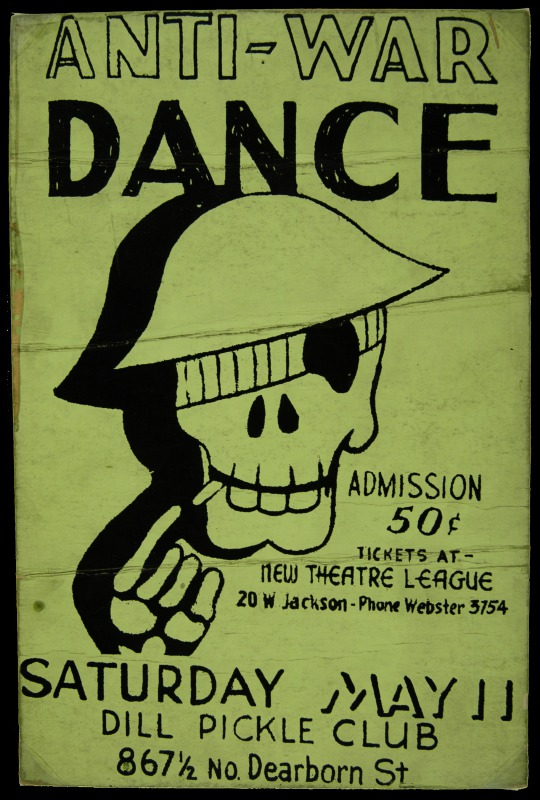
A poster advertising an Anti-War Dance at the Dill Pickle Club during 1918.

As Jim Allege and others have documented, the Club played a pivotal role in the overlapping communities of queers and leftists during the Jazz Age, hosting panels such as "Do Perverts Menace Society?"--with Reitman and John Loughman arguing the negative.

=== Satire and Scandal ===
The Club's irreverence knew few bounds. One heckler interrupted an anti-smoking talk by saying the speaker's face alone made him want to start smoking. Another event, planned around a pregnant woman debating her options--abortion, adoption, or suicide--erupted into a riot of thrown eggs and vegetables. Even some regulars declared it a step too far.

=== Decline and Closure ===
By the late 1920s, many of the club's original literary figures had left for New York or Hollywood. At the same time, mob interests pressured Jones to allow bootlegging, and when he refused, authorities cracked down. In 1931, Jones was arrested for selling alcohol during Prohibition. After accumulating 150 citations in a single winter, the club was shuttered in 1933 under a rarely-enforced stature barring dance halls near churches.

Attempts to reopen the club in 1944 failed when the building was condemned. Jones died in poverty in 1940.

== Legacy ==
Despite its chaotic demise, the Dill Pickle Club remains one of Chicago's most storied artistic and intellectual institutions. Chicago Magazine listed it among the city's 40 greatest artistic breakthroughs. According to Franklin Rosemont, it was "far and away the best-loved, most notorious, most stimulating, and most influential little gathering place in the city's history."

The club inspired later forums such as the College of Complexes and has been revived in name by modern arts organizations across the country. In recent years, historians have reassessed the club's significants in both LGBTQ+ and labor history, underscoring its role in advancing dissident discourse during an era of repression.

Today, nothing remains of the original Tooker Place barn but a parking garage.

== Popular attendees ==
The club was frequented by many radical American activists, political speakers and authors. It was accepting of homosexuals. Among the American activists and speakers was Clarence Darrow, Emma Goldman, Big Bill Haywood, Hippolyte Havel, Lucy Parsons, Ben Reitman and Nina Spies. American authors included Pulitzer Prize winner Upton Sinclair along with Sherwood Anderson, Carl Sandburg, Ben Hecht, Arthur Desmond, Vachel Lindsay, Djuna Barnes, William Carlos Williams, Kenneth Rexroth and Vincent Starrett. Other common attendees were poet, writer and Wobbly, Slim Brundage, speaker Martha Biegler, speaker Elizabeth Davis, artist Stanislav Szukalski, Harry Wilson and egoist F. M. Wilkesbarr (aka Malfew Seklew).

A club for people with ideas and questions, it often attracted a mixed crowd. Scientists, panhandlers, prostitutes, socialists, anarchists, con men, tax advocates, religious zealots, social workers and hoboes were commonly at the club. Chicagoan George Wellington "Cap" Streeter was also said to have visited and spoken at the Dil Pickle Club.

== In literature ==
The Dill Pickle Club features prominently in the play Dear Rhoda by Donna Russell and David Ranney.

== Notes ==
- Original Dill Pickle Club address: 10 Tooker Place, Chicago, Illinois
