= Hotel Del Prado =

- U.S. National Register of Historic Places
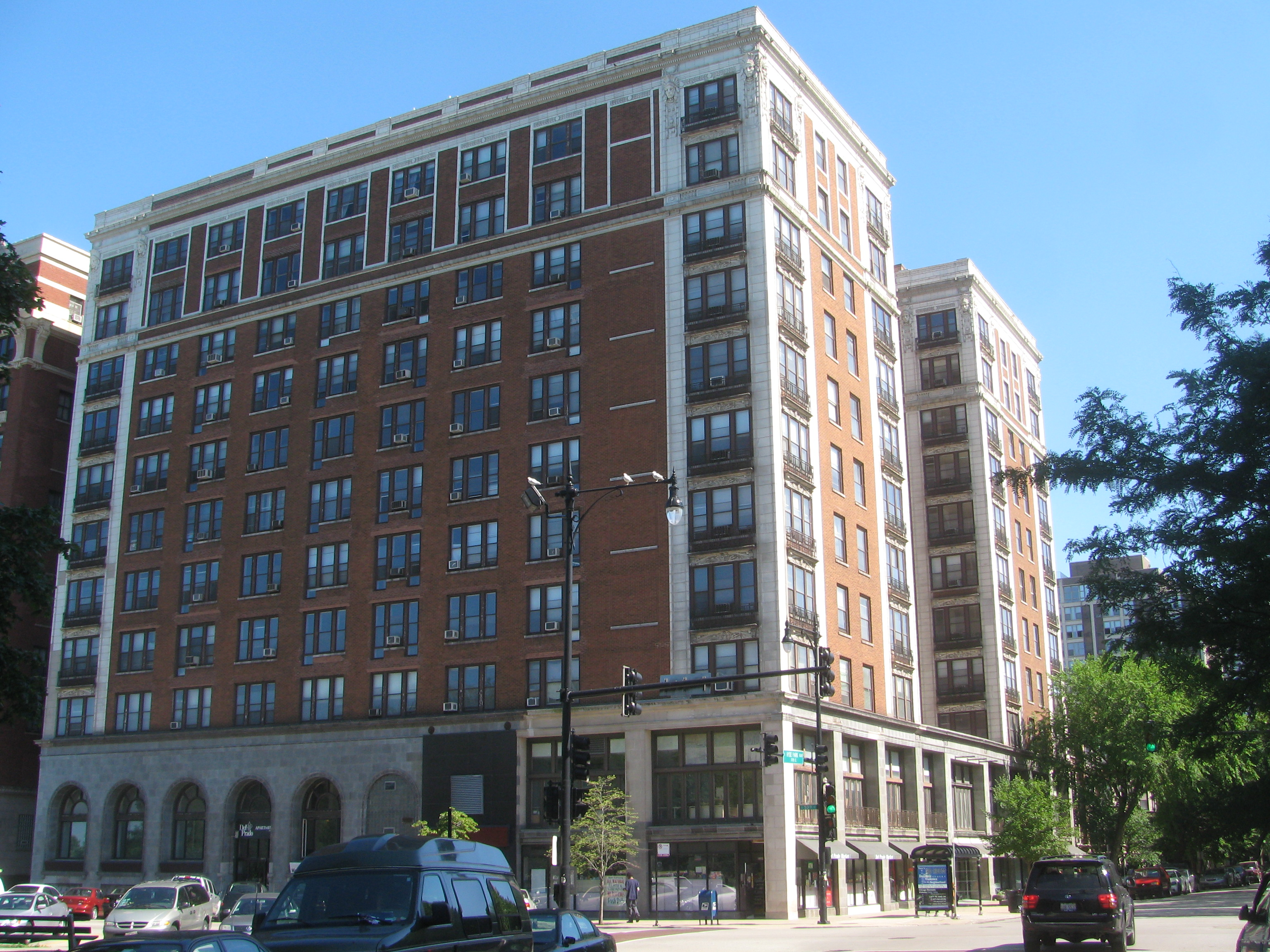

- Location within Chicago metropolitan area Location within Illinois Location within the United States
- Location: 5307 S. Hyde Park Blvd., Chicago, Illinois
- Coordinates: 41°47′58″N 87°35′02″W
- Area: 0.5 acres (0.20 ha)
- Built: 1918
- Built by: Cooper, Sherman T.
- Architectural style: Neoclassical
- MPS: Hyde Park Apartment Hotels TR
- NRHP reference No.: 86001195
- Added to NRHP: May 14, 1986

The Hotel Del Prado is a historic apartment hotel at 5307 S. Hyde Park Boulevard in the Hyde Park neighborhood in Chicago, Illinois. Built in 1918, it is the oldest of the several apartment hotels built in Hyde Park in the late 1910s and 1920s.

Hyde Park was growing in both population and prestige at the time, creating a need for additional housing. Apartment hotels were a fashionable choice, as they combined the amenities and prestige of hotels with the affordability of apartments. The Hotel Del Prado had 198 apartments and included commercial space on its first and second floors. Its Neoclassical design includes Palladian windows on its lower floors, terra cotta trim throughout its exterior, and carved American Indian heads atop terra cotta columns.

The building was added to the National Register of Historic Places on May 14, 1986.
