= Chicago Renaissance =

Chicago Renaissance may refer to:

- Chicago Black Renaissance, 1930–1940s creative movement from the Chicago Black Belt
- Chicago Renaissance, multiple periods of innovation in Chicago literature in the early 20th century
