= Charles Washington (disambiguation) =

Charles Washington (1738–1799) was the youngest brother of United States President George Washington.

Charles or Chuck Washington may also refer to:

- Charles Washington (defensive back, born 1966) (born 1966), American football player
- Charles Washington (defensive back, born 1993) (born 1993), American football player
- Charles B. Washington (1923–1986), American civil rights activist
- Chuck Washington (American football) (born 1964), American football defensive back
- Chuck Washington (politician), American politician from California
