= Founder mode =

Leadership concept coined by Paul Graham

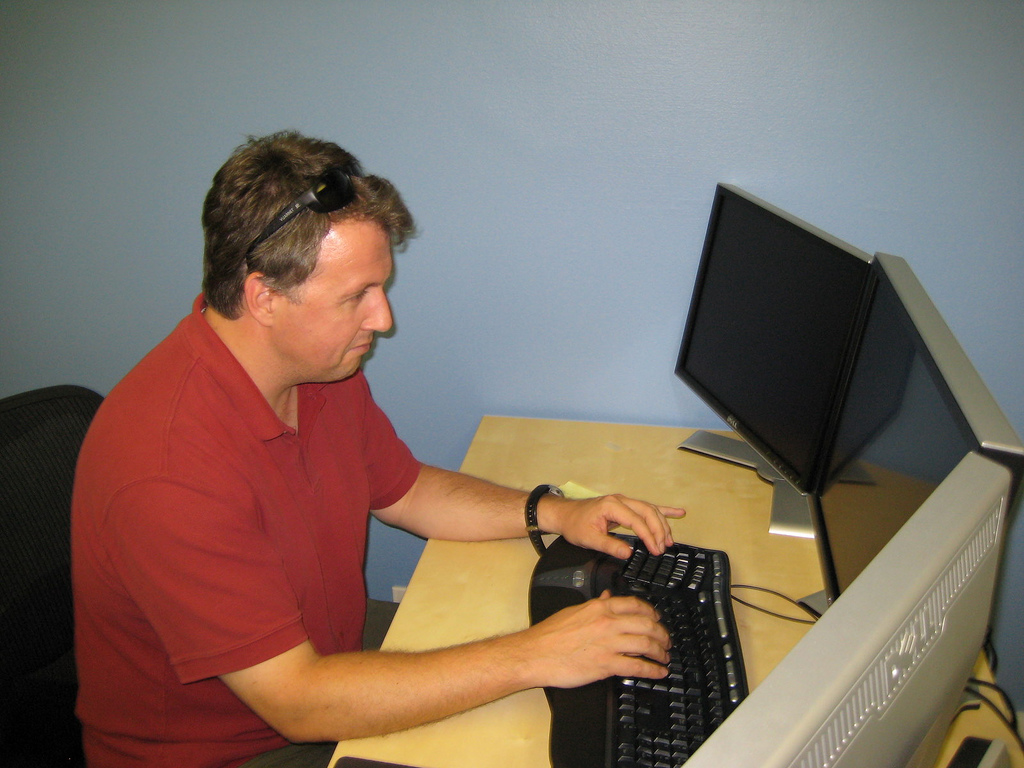
Graham, who wrote an essay about founder mode

Founder mode is a term used and popularized by Y Combinator co-founder Paul Graham in a September 2024 essay in response to a talk delivered by Airbnb co-founder Brian Chesky. It describes a specific kind of leadership in which a founder has a direct, hands-on approach to their company rather than breaking up and delegating responsibility through a top-down structure. Often cited examples of leaders embodying founder mode include Steve Jobs, Elon Musk, and Jensen Huang.

Immediately after its online publication, Graham's essay led to widespread debate and discourse about the different methodologies regarding how to run a company, the pros and cons of micromanagement, and the nature of founder personalities versus that of non-founders, among other relevant concerns. It also spurred many memes, jokes, and stereotypes about the culture surrounding Silicon Valley and big tech.

== Chesky's speech ==
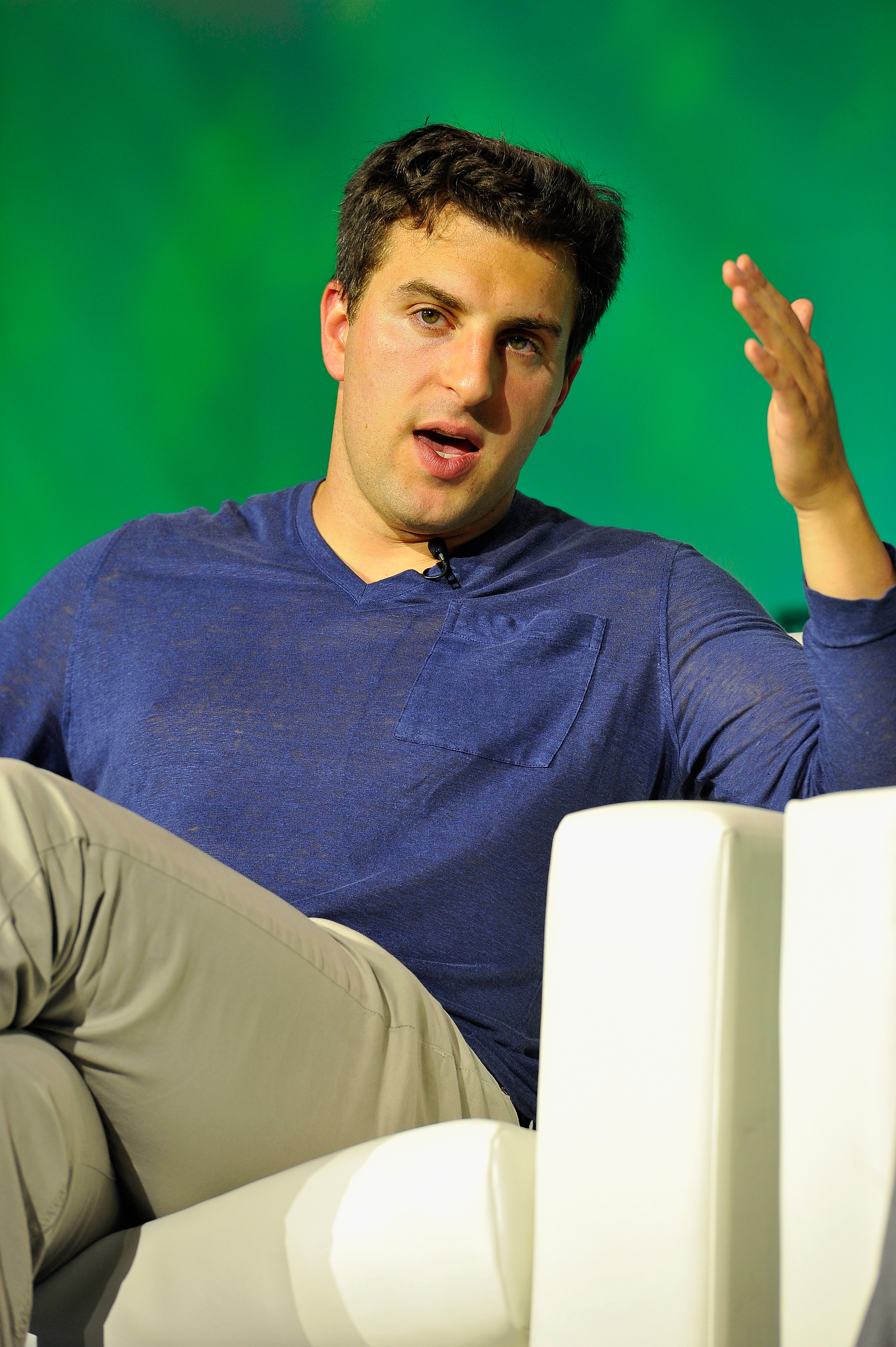
Chesky, co-founder of Airbnb

Through the COVID-19 pandemic starting in 2020, Airbnb faced a crisis in which lodging bookings fell by 80% within weeks and forced to delay the company's plans to go public. As a result, Chesky strategized on how to reform Airbnb and subsequently made several changes in his company: he laid off a quarter of staff, redrew the company hierarchy around function, and personally centralized product planning. One year later, Airbnb recovered and started generating more revenue than ever before; the company generated $6 billion in revenue in 2021 and nearly $10 billion by 2023.

In September of 2024, Chesky attended a Y Combinator event and delivered a talk discussing various methodologies of company management and drawing upon his own experiences in founding and running Airbnb. (Chesky had previously delivered a shorter version of the same talk at a Figma conference.) In particular, Chesky found that the leadership model of "hire people and give them room to do their jobs" was disastrous for Airbnb; instead, he studied how Jobs managed Apple and pivoted to Jobs' leadership model which greatly improved Airbnb's outcomes.

The talk was intended to be off the record and last for only half an hour, but it ended up stretching to two. According to Graham, who was also in attendance, many other founders present said the talk was the best talk they had ever witnessed. They also echoed the same observations and conclusions that Chesky had shared:

The audience at this event included a lot of the most successful founders we've funded, and one after another said that the same thing had happened to them. They'd been given the same advice about how to run their companies as they grew, but instead of helping their companies, it had damaged them.

== Graham's definition ==
In an essay posted to his website, Graham sought to better understand why many founders were being told "the wrong thing"; his initial observation was that founders were being taught how to stop being founders and instead be managers. In particular, Graham defined the managerial methodology as such: "You tell your direct reports what to do, and it's up to them to figure out how. But you don't get involved in the details of what they do. That would be micromanaging them, which is bad." He then proceeded to state that such a methodology was flawed because founders had unique qualities that needed expression in order for their companies to succeed.

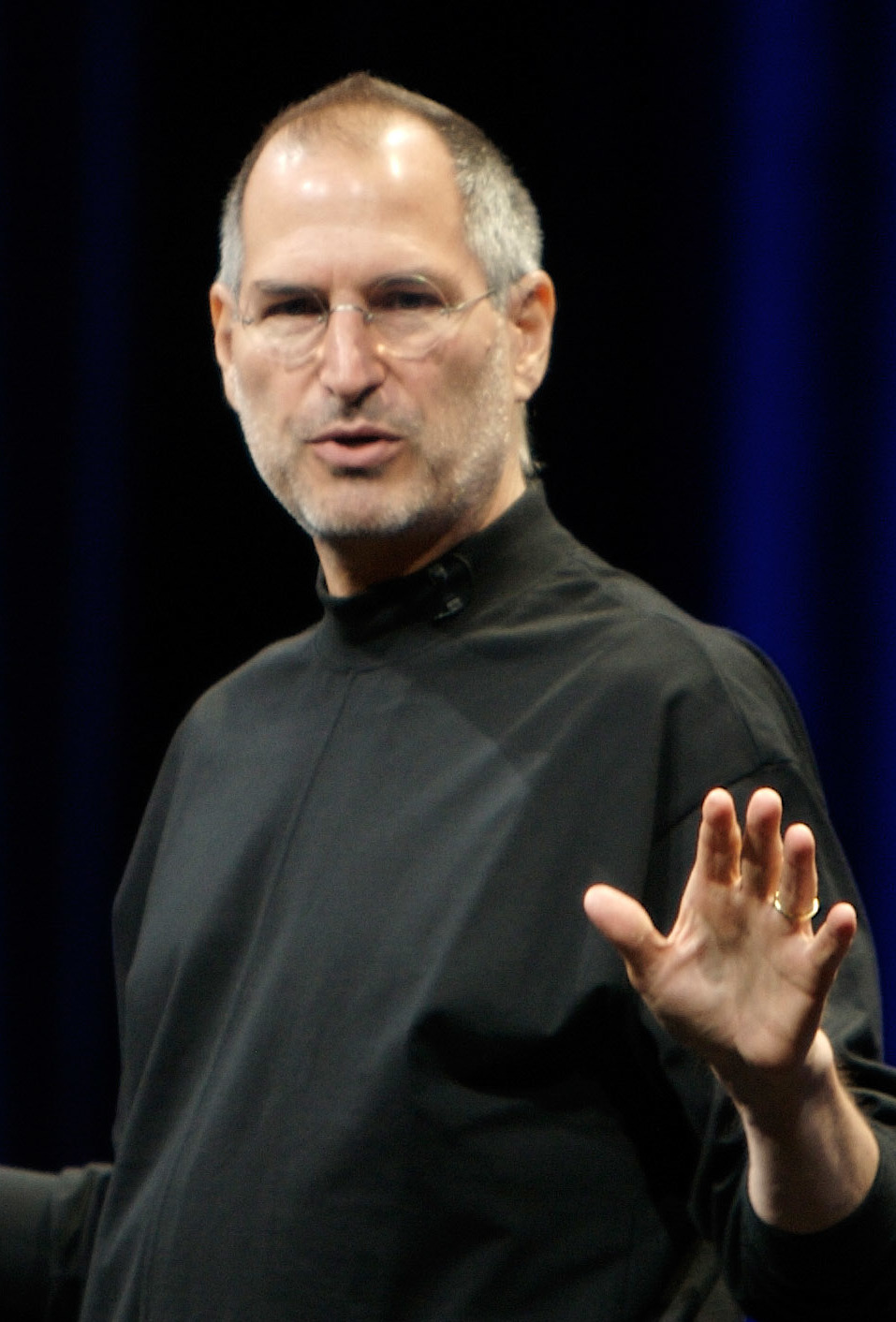
Jobs, a "founder mode" founder according to Chesky and Graham

According to Graham, most founders have been told to believe that they must pivot toward a "manager mode" in order to properly grow their companies, but Graham stated "we can infer the existence of another mode from the dismay of founders who've tried it, and the success of their attempts to escape from it." He then proceeded to introduce and define "founder mode" which hasn't been studied in books or business schools but nonetheless evidenced by several success stories of founders.

Rather than a company structure where "you treat subtrees of the org chart as black boxes," Graham proposed several possible features of founder mode such as the normalization of skip-level meetings, not relying upon organizational charts to determine the relative importance of employees, and overall a more hands-on and micromanagerial approach to leadership. However, Graham also stated that much of the founder mode is still unknown and, even if known, would have to be differently implemented for every company.

Graham concluded his essay with a prediction that "once we figure out what [founder mode] is, we'll find that a number of individual founders were already most of the way there—except that in doing what they did they were regarded by many as eccentric or worse." Optimistically, he ended by saying, "it's an encouraging thought that we still know so little about founder mode. Look at what founders have achieved already, and yet they've achieved this against a headwind of bad advice."

Prior to its publication, Graham's essay had been read and reviewed by several of his peers including Musk, Patrick Collison, Ryan Petersen, Ron Conway, Jessica Livingston, Garry Tan, and Harj Taggar.

== Further definitions ==
In The Verge, Chesky himself stated that founder mode was an appealing name but lamented that due to its viral traction, founder mode became mistakenly associated with "swagger" and repeatedly parroted by people who didn't actually know what Graham had meant. As a point of clarification, Chesky stated that founder mode was about leaders being invested in the details of their companies rather than losing sight of expertise through chains of management. Chesky also stated that chief executive officers should be experts in the products sold by their companies as if they were chief product officers. Additionally, Chesky pushed back against the unsavoriness surrounding the term of micromanagement; he shared a conversation he had with Reed Jobs who disagreed that his father was a micromanager because he collaborated with his employees' ideas rather than taking ownership of them; Chesky additionally stated that other Apple employees like Jony Ive and Hiroki Asai never saw Jobs as a micromanager either.

Marty Cagan of Silicon Valley Product Group redefined "manager mode" as "the delegator" and came up with a third category called the "micromanager mode." According to Cagan, delegators lead via "divide and conquer" and rely upon delegation and allocation of labor into black boxes; both Cagan and Graham named John Sculley as the delegator ideal insofar as he managed Apple by "delegating down the organization without any real understanding of the company's products, customers, enabling technology, or even the methods of tech-powered product development." Meanwhile, micromanagers are people who do not "trust their people to be able to make decisions, take ownership and accountability, and work through solutions" and therefore intervene "at the task level to make decisions, direct resources and manage milestones personally." Of founder mode, Cagan pushed back against its conflation with micromanaging and stated it was a passionate and collaborative position emerging from a desire to deliver good products to customers.

Following Graham's article, Samantha Hellauer, Sanja Kos, Julie Vermoote, and BJ Wright of Harvard Business Review led a study of "50 successful founder CEOs and 58 non-founder CEOs in private equity–backed companies" which involved studying "more than 1,400 data points" and dozens of interviews with industry leaders. They identified three commonalities for success: divergent thinking; intrinsic motivation; and exclusive, loyal inner circles. They also found five "superpowers" or strengths: creativity and articulation of ideas, inspirational character, an obsession with customer obsession, excessive drive to deliver, and adaptive/pivoting ability. The writers additionally stated that successful founders possessed "innate traits... that are hard to teach or change" whereas non-founder chief executive officers had a skill set more able to be taught and instilled. Regarding weaknesses, however, the writers pointed out that the passion of founders also sometimes led to problems taking criticism, building structures, replacing talent, clearly communicating, and ignoring risk. They concluded that founders must synthesize both founder mode and manager mode for general success.

== Reactions ==
Immediately after its posting, Graham's essay garnered over 20 million views on Twitter. It drew widespread attention from industry leaders either in agreement, disagreement, or mixed opinion of the founder mode, with some defending manager mode and traditional understandings of how to lead businesses. According to Fortune, it only took a weekend for the notion of founder mode "to take on a Rorschach test quality as people projected their own ideals onto Graham's inkblot."

Graham's essay also spurred media outlets and publications seeking to pinpoint more precise definitions of what founder mode could be. Response articles on the founder mode versus manager mode debate were written in Business Insider, Forbes, and Fortune, among others. Other writers tried to translate Graham's essay into practical advice on how to pivot to founder mode and even apply it to non-entrepreneurial contexts. Many questioned whether a whole adoption of founder mode was really the answer to leadership.

On social media, founder mode became subject to both "praise and criticism," as well as memes, mockery, and jokes among those inside and outside of the tech sector. Specifically, some saw the discourse about founder mode as an opportunity to poke fun at tech bros and founder types. Others called it nothing more than a new buzzword.

=== Endorsements ===
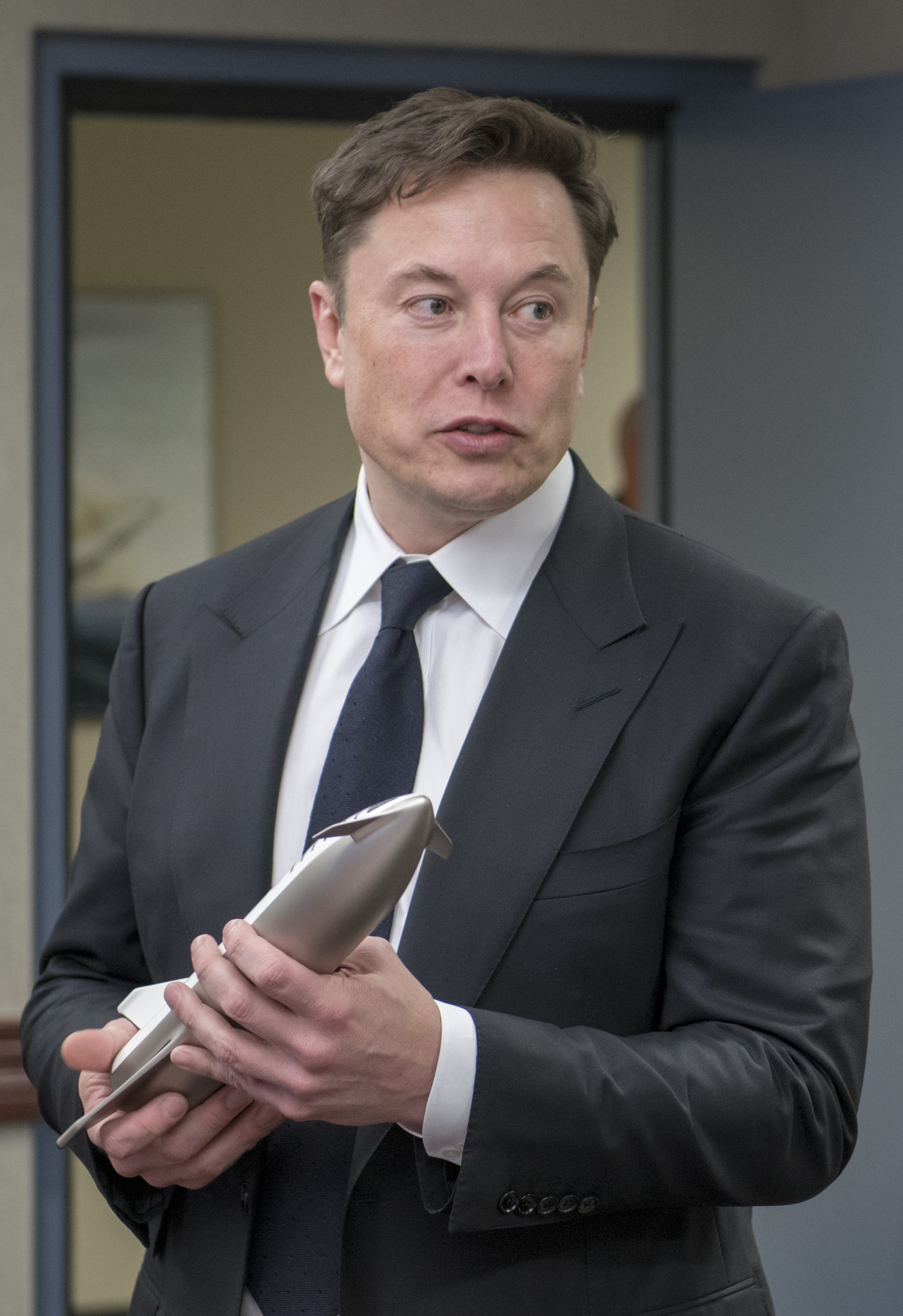
Musk, who had provided feedback for and subsequently retweeted Graham's article

Graham's essay was praised by many and seen as influential. Several industry leaders shared online that they resonated with Graham's sentiments including Mark Pincus of Zynga, Garry Tan of Y Combinator, Michael Dell of Dell, Roy Bahat of Bloomberg Beta, Dharmesh Shah of HubSpot, and many others. Musk retweeted Graham's essay and called it a worthwhile read; he had read and provided feedback for it prior to its publication. Former Yext CEO Howard Lerman said that it was getting many founders "fired up," and Y Combinator employee Jared Friedman stated that it would become a "foundational" piece of advice for anyone looking to start a company.

Some writers tried to retroactively apply founder mode to past success stories in the tech sector. Tim Higgins, in The Wall Street Journal, said founder mode pushed Jobs to take a risk on the iPhone and allowed Musk to make electric vehicles popular; Higgins additionally cited Musk's self-description as a "nano manager" who spoke directly with his engineers and even slept on the factory floor during production cycles—biographer Walter Isaacson referred to his style as "demon mode."

Tobias Lütke, co-founder and CEO of Shopify, found Chesky and Graham's experiences and conclusions relatable, stating that "We need founder-mode companies in all industries." He also pointed to Lisa Su of AMD and Satya Nadella of Microsoft as examples of managers who have been able to replicate founder mode despite not having founded their companies. (On the contrary, entrepreneur Henrik Torstensson called Nadella a "Hall of Fame example" of someone who has implemented manager mode "as good as is humanly possible"; others have echoed similar assessments of the Microsoft leader.)

Venture capitalist Semyon Dukach argued that Graham wasn't proposing micromanagement but rather less "over-delegating" to managers with "a lot of credibility on paper": "While [founders] must put in place competent and independent-minded managers, they should also be active and curious about every part of the company... You need to still be spending time with regular employees and showing them you care about what they're working on." He also shared that micromanagement isn't necessary if ambitious and driven talent was hired.

Instacart CEO Fidji Simo remarked that founder mode should "trickle down to others at the company, including nonfounder CEOs and executives who run critical business units" so that companies "could become breeding grounds for other founder-mode leaders and CEOs"; she cited her experience at Meta as proof of such a trend in action.

Ashraf Hebela, the head of startup banking at J.P. Morgan, said that the specifics of founder mode were less important than its overarching idea of being committed to one's vision; he also dismissed trying to define particular attributes of successful leadership and attempting to create a certain culture around how entrepreneurs should be.

Coalesce co-founder Armon Petrossian stated that Graham's advice "hit home" and mentioned Vinod Khosla's advice regarding the importance of knowing whose advice to take. Although Petrossian commended the "relentless drive to take a company from zero to reality" within founder mode, he also stated that "it's only a matter of time before the necessary day-to-day requirements of operating a business take over. You start worrying about things like budgets, customer acquisition costs and return on investment." According to him, the balance between founder mode and manager mode was crucial to maintaining logistics in an ever-growing company.

Lunchbox founder Nabeel Alamgir wrote that the age-old advice of manager mode was "one of the biggest lies ever told" and shared that the methodology caused Lunchbox to falsely rely on managers who are "performative and amazing at telling you what you want," causing Alamgir to over-hire and subsequently lay off 100 employees.

=== Women founders ===
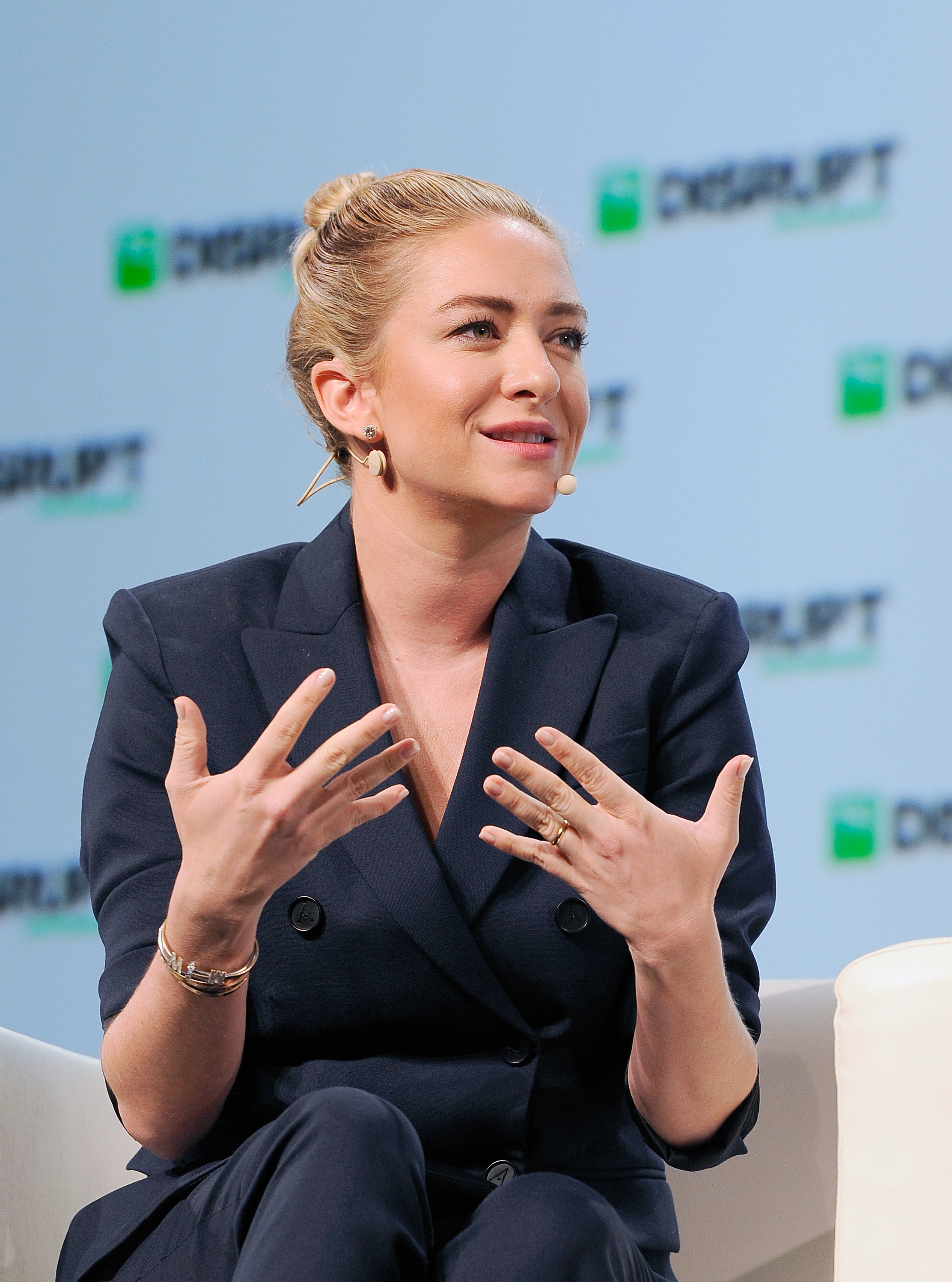
Herd, founder and CEO of Bumble

Many women in the tech sector and other industries, such as Summer Health founder Ellen DaSilva, pointed out that founder mode was a methodology available only to male founders and that women in leadership roles rarely were given the same leeway to micromanage their companies. Bumble founder and CEO Whitney Wolfe Herd stated that she was "in founder mode for 10 years and got attacked for it every single day." Some brought up old think-pieces harshly criticizing Steph Korey's leadership at Away as proof that women weren't allowed to embody founder mode. Diana Ransom wrote that several women founders were virtually canceled for attempting to embody founder mode including Sophia Amoruso, Christene Barberich, and many others. Sara Mauskopf, co-founder of Winnie, said that "It's not easy for a woman to act like Elon Musk and get away with it" and brought up the case of Audrey Gelman at The Wing. She stated further:

There's an assumption that women leaders need to be more nurturing, and when they're tough on employees, it's magnified. And a lot of Paul Graham's essay is about being direct, talking to employees at all levels, and in some cases giving tough, honest feedback about the work product you're expecting.

Following Graham's essay, Chesky himself stated that "Women founders have been reaching out to me over the past 24 hours about how they don't have permission to run their companies in Founder Mode the same way men can. This needs to change." When someone questioned Chesky's statement, he shared a 2020 article from Business Insider celebrating the downfall of women founders who were considered too abusive in their workplaces; he also retweeted posts from several women founders who had found themselves unable to lead in founder mode.

=== Critiques ===
Graham's essay drew much criticism from industry leaders. Some called the attempt to define a one-size-fits-all approach to leadership a futile task, while others raised several cons in particular regards to founder mode and even pushed back against Graham's example of Jobs being a good representative of it. Many stated that a middle-of-the-road approach between founder mode and manager mode, or a less monolithic definition of leadership in general, was a better way to tackle the complexities of running a company.

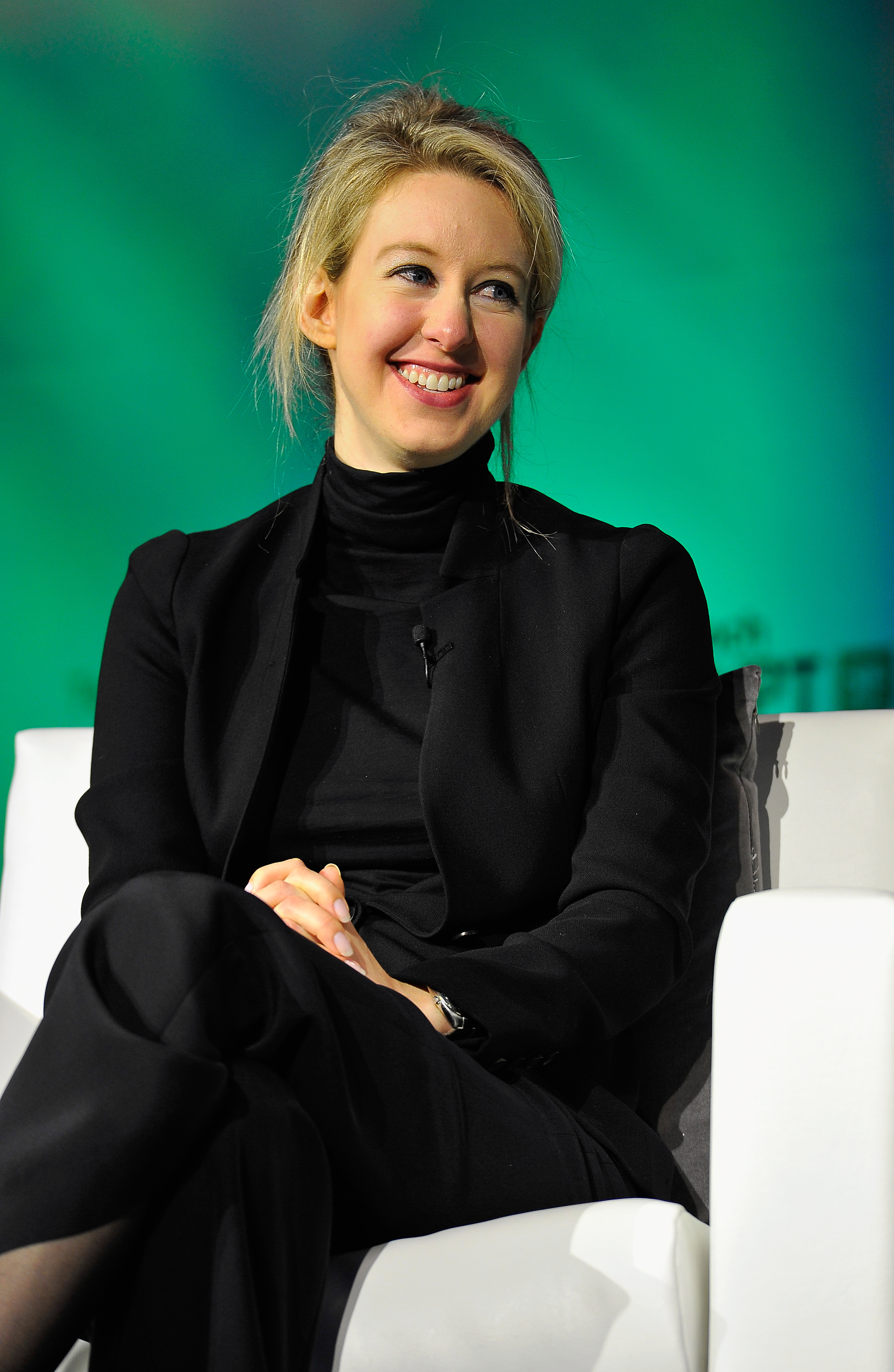
Holmes, former founder and CEO of Theranos

Allison Morrow in CNN raised several counter-examples to Graham's invocation of Jobs including Jeff Bezos, Musk, Huang, and Ray Dalio, all of whom, according to Morrow, have micromanaged their companies with sometimes negative results and represented "a certain personality"; of Dalio in particular, Morrow called him "an almost cartoonishly tyrannical boss whose staffers were directed to narc on one another for even the pettiest of problems." Ultimately, Morrow stated that "Founder mode isn't inherently bad... But it's not sustainable" and also pointed out that Graham's examples of founder mode were either exceptions or leaders who actually had high-level managers working with them. Chad Dickerson, the former CEO of Etsy, said that founder mode only works for an exceptional few and with the right conditions; without those, founder mode "can be an excuse for all kinds of bad behavior that increases the odds of failure."

Joe Procopio stated that "Founder mode is not new and it's not rocket science. It's not even a trend. It's become more of a meme-starter... basically another misguided attempt to break down leadership into two binary personas... probably shooting for 'a term coined by Paul Graham in a controversial 2024 blog post.'" He then stated that all startups inevitably start with a visionary who has to later be "shown the door at some point" in terms of having to "set up and manage the required chain of command" and that successful leadership requires founders to be both visionaries and tacticians. Regarding bad examples of founder mode, Procopio named Elizabeth Holmes and Adam Neumann. Likewise, James MacDonald, co-founder of Limelight.inc, said that micromanagement should generally decrease as companies scale; in his own experience, he realized that he needed to rely on the talents of others as his company grew and that he couldn't have possibly augmented operations without trusting his employees.

Hussein Kanji of Hoxton Ventures said that the idea of founder mode was sensationalized and attempted to reduce the complexities and contingencies of leadership into a one-size-fits-all approach; pushing back on Graham's idea, he said there were many different truths to how to successfully operate a business and, of the ensuing discourse, remarked that "People have lost their ability to engage with seemingly contradictory ideas at the same time."

Cara Whitehill of Thayer Ventures criticized Graham for not being able to define founder mode while reductively describing manager mode as lacking responsibility for one's own company. She said that there was no one-size-fits-all mode but rather upheld adaptability in a wide variety of circumstances as an ideal of leadership. Likewise, Zartico CEO Sarah Lehman called the founder-manager dichotomy both wrong and misleading and instead recommended "entrepreneurial leadership"—which emphasizes an "innovative spirit" embedded within "professional management practices"—as an adaptive and tactical approach to transcend the two modes.

Kim Scott, writing in The New York Times, referred to founder mode as an obsession with "one-man rule" in the tech sector and saw its idolization of unilateral authority as an explanation for Donald Trump's popularity. Ultimately, she saw founder mode unsustainable and damaging for both companies and governments.

=== Defenses of manager mode ===
Many critiqued Graham's advocacy of founder mode by naming examples of CEOs who were able to successfully operate as managers themselves or otherwise run companies through a managerial philosophy; Tim Cook of Apple was often named. Many also brought up Microsoft's leadership under non-founder Nadella. Sam Gerstenzang, on Twitter, stated that founders like Bezos and Reed Hastings were able to succeed with their respective companies without having to micromanage their talent.

American entrepreneur Marc Lore said he didn't agree with Graham's essay because he preferred management with a strong, informed foundation: "When everybody is fully aligned and you have really good people, you just let them run; I don't need to be involved at all. So I don't get involved in the specifics of what people do, as long as they know the nuances of the strategy and the vision." He specified that instilling a founder's vision into strong, driven employees while monitoring them with the relevant performance metrics was crucial to a successful execution of manager mode.

Brian Gong of Cameron Ventures stated that a mix of both manager mode and founder mode was needed, especially when companies grew past the threshold of 100 employees. Specifically, he stated that founders should "still be involved in significant decision making and hold the final vote on things but need to learn how to delegate." Tidalwave.ai Diane Yu identified her own mode of leadership which abided by the following tenet: "Hire the people who can do a better job than you do for an aspect of the work, observe firsthand how they are doing a better job."

== List of founder mode individuals ==
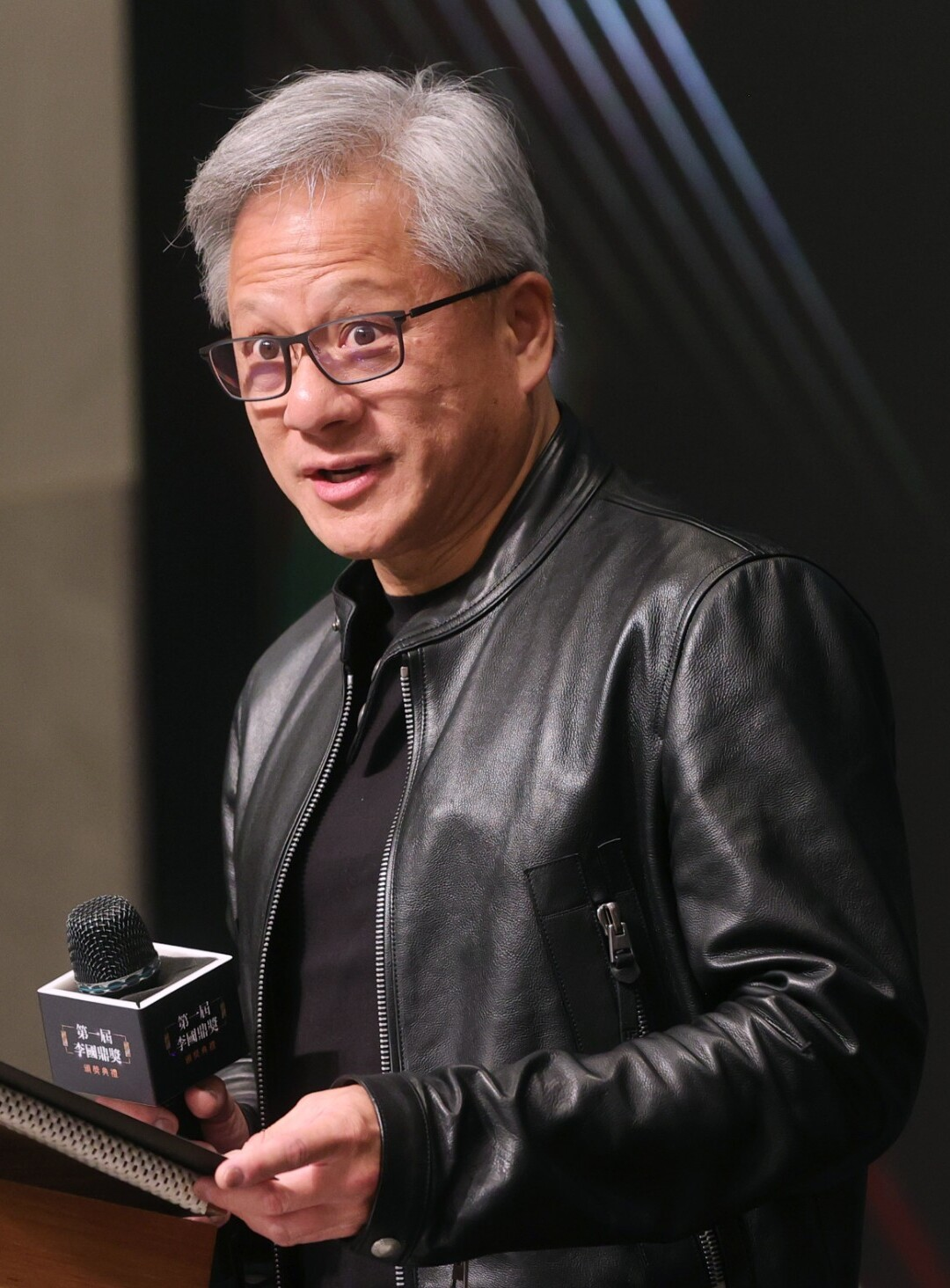
Huang, co-founder and CEO of Nvidia

Throughout the ensuing discourse resulting from Graham's essay, various pieces attempted to identify more "founder mode" individuals beyond Chesky and Jobs. Names were mentioned by both proponents and detractors of founder mode.

=== Names mentioned ===
- Walt Disney
- Bill Hewlett and David Packard
- Daniel Ek
- Larry Page and Sergey Brin
- Reed Hastings
- Jensen Huang
- Elon Musk
- Sam Altman
- Steph Korey
- Elizabeth Holmes
- Jeff Bezos
- Luis von Ahn
- Lisa Su
- Mark Zuckerberg
- MrBeast
- Adam Neumann
- Sam Bankman-Fried
- Peter Beck
- Kamala Harris
