= Barack Obama Presidential Center =

Library in Chicago, Illinois

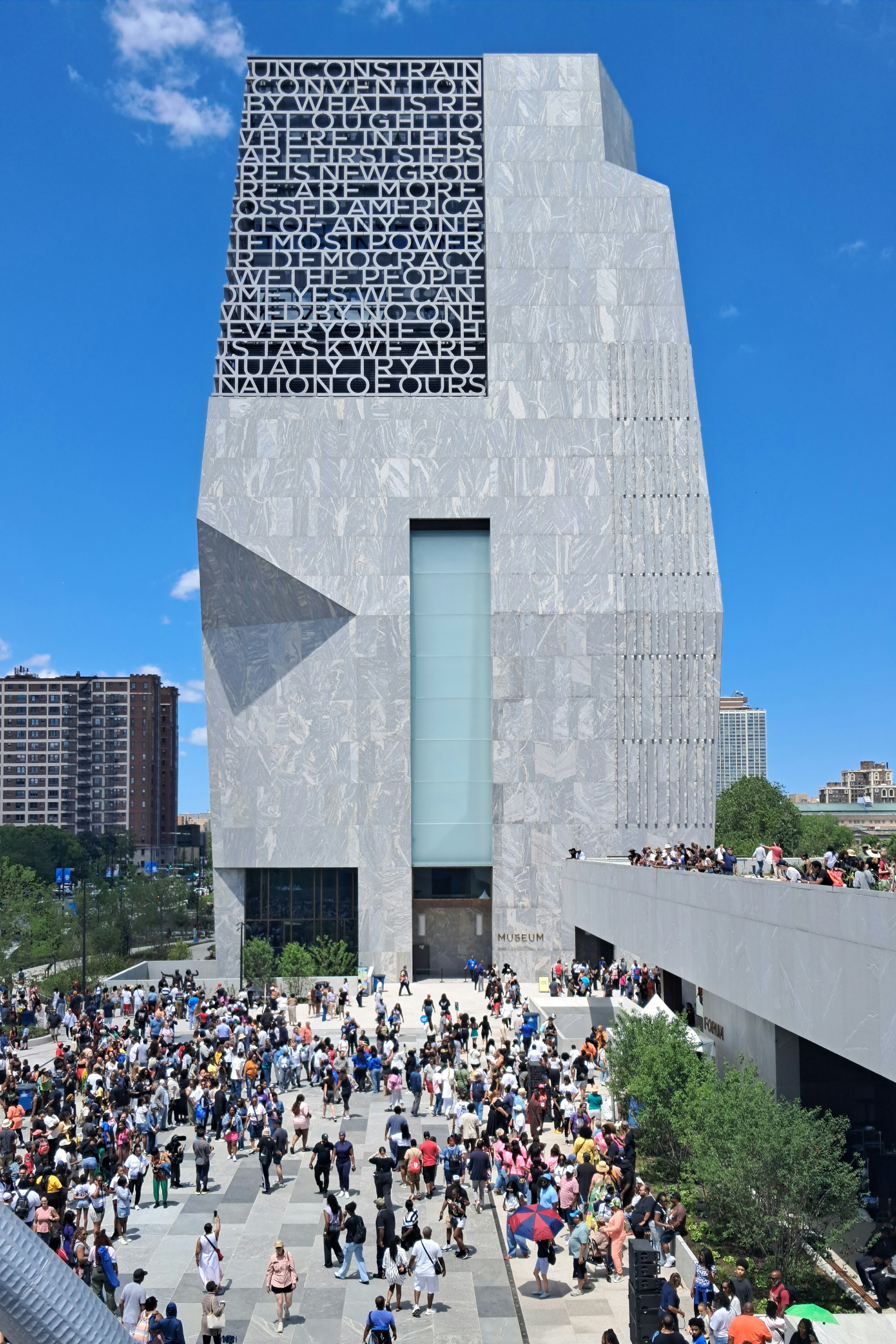
- Obama Center's museum tower and John Lewis Plaza on opening day, June 2026

General information
- Architectural style: Contemporary
- Location: 6001 S. Stony Island Avenue, Chicago, Illinois
- Coordinates: 41°47′11″N 87°35′09″W
- Named for: Barack Obama
- Construction started: August 16, 2021
- Opened: June 19, 2026
- Inaugurated: June 18, 2026
- Cost: $850 million (est.)
- Operator: Obama Foundation; Valerie Jarrett (CEO); Kenvi Phillips (director)

Technical details
- Size: 19.3 acres (78,000 m^{2})

Design and construction
- Architects: Tod Williams Billie Tsien Architects, and Interactive Design Architects: Landscape architect: Michael Van Valkenburgh Associates, Site Design Group, and Living Habitats; Home Court athletics center: Moody Nolan

Other information
- Public transit: 59th Street/University of Chicago or 55th/56th/57th Street station CTA

Website
- obama.org/visit/; www.obamalibrary.gov

The Barack Obama Presidential Center is a museum, library, and education project in Chicago to commemorate the presidency of Barack Obama, the 44th president of the United States. The center includes a museum, community and conference facilities and houses the nonprofit Obama Foundation. Also included within the Center is a branch of the Chicago Public Library, and a community athletic facility, within a broad expanse of landscaped public park, gardens, and playground. A dedication ceremony was held on June 18, 2026, before opening to the public the next day, on June 19, Juneteenth.

The center's work includes digitizing the Barack Obama Presidential Library with the National Archives and Records Administration (NARA), to create the first fully digitized presidential library. Though NARA, which administers the library, loaned many documents and artifacts to the Presidential Center for display, they will be archived and preserved at a separate facility. The library holds over 600 cubic feet of audiovisual recordings and approximately 3 million photographs, predominantly from Obama's time in the White House.

The center is located on a 19.3-acre (7.8 ha) campus in Jackson Park on the South Side of Chicago, adjacent to the University of Chicago campus and bordering the Hyde Park and Woodlawn community areas. The center's main entry point is located at John Lewis Plaza. The university provides planning, support, engagement and programming.

== Board and staff ==
The Obama Foundation board includes Chairman Marty Nesbitt, a close friend of Barack Obama from Chicago; J. Kevin Poorman, president and CEO of PSP Capital Partners; David Plouffe; Obama's half-sister Maya Soetoro-Ng; venture capital financier John Doerr; Studio Museum in Harlem Director and Chief Curator Thelma Golden; fundraiser and former White House Social Secretary Julianna Smoot; investment managers John W. Rogers Jr. and Michael Sacks; and former Governor of Massachusetts Deval Patrick. Barack Obama has a home in Hyde Park. The foundation was formally established in January 2014.

Louise Bernard, outgoing Director of Exhibitions at the New York Public Library, was named director of the Museum of the Obama Presidential Center in May 2017. Michael Strautmanis became the vice-president of civic engagement for the foundation in 2016.

Kenvi Phillips was appointed as the inaugural director of the Barack Obama Presidential Library for a term beginning June 16, 2024.

== Site selection ==
In 2014, the Obama Foundation released details for institutions interested in being the location of the center.

The foundation received bids from four institutions:

- Columbia University (New York City)
- University of Chicago (Chicago)
- University of Illinois at Chicago (Chicago)
- University of Hawaiʻi at Mānoa (Honolulu)

In May 2015, the foundation's board announced it had decided to build the center in partnership with the University of Chicago. Obama taught constitutional law at the University of Chicago Law School from 1992 to 2004.

After the foundation's board had selected to build the center in partnership with the University of Chicago they began deciding between two possible locations, Washington Park and Jackson Park. They ultimately selected Jackson Park.

In 2018, the Obama Foundation released the proposed bid by the University of Chicago, and the three other universities. The 2014 bid revealed that the University of Chicago included various plans, such as combining the golf courses at South Shore and Jackson Park into a single "world class facility", and the closing of Cornell Drive and other streets in the vicinity of Jackson Park in order to improve the connecting green space for museums located in a nearby area known as "Museum Campus South".

== Planning and design ==
=== Layout ===
The Center consists of four buildings and acres of landscaped public park: the museum tower, the forum building, and the library are centered around a plaza to the north; the athletic center is separate to the south in the park with a large modern playground. The tower and plaza buildings are clad in light-color New Hampshire granite. The lower level plaza buildings, have "large, planted gathering spaces [] slop[ing] from ground level to the top of the Forum and Library buildings, while smaller gardens climb to rooftops and descend to sunken courtyards."

=== Proposals and building ===
A 2014 Voice of America video covering the bidding process for the Barack Obama Presidential Center

The University of Chicago, the University of Illinois at Chicago, the University of Hawaii, and Columbia University submitted proposals to host the institution. In May 2015, the Barack Obama Foundation and Chicago mayor Rahm Emanuel announced that the foundation and the Barack Obama Presidential Center would be located in Chicago's South Side, and would be built in partnership with the University of Chicago. Both the former president and his wife Michelle Obama stressed the importance of Chicago's South Side as an influence in their own lives. She said, "One of my greatest honors is being a proud Chicagoan, a daughter of the South Side. I still lead with that descriptor. I wear it boldly and proudly like a crown."

A design advisory committee assisted in the selection of the architects. Members of the committee included sculptor Don Gummer (the ex-husband of actress Meryl Streep); Ed Schlossberg of ESI Design (husband of Caroline Kennedy, the former U.S. ambassador to Japan); Fred Eychaner, a Chicago radio station owner and Democratic financier; and Architectural Digest magazine editor Margaret Russell. Seven architectural firms were announced as finalists in December 2015 from an initial list of 140 applicants: John Ronan Architects, Adjaye Associates, Diller Scofidio + Renfro, Renzo Piano Building Workshop, SHoP Architects, Snøhetta, and Tod Williams Billie Tsien Architects.

In June 2016, the foundation chose New York-based Tod Williams Billie Tsien Architects and Chicago-based Interactive Design Architects to jointly lead the design and engineering of the center. For the exhibition design, Ralph Appelbaum Associates, which worked on the National Museum of African American History, will lead a team including Civic Projects, Normal, and several local artists. The landscape architect is Michael Van Valkenburgh Associates, with Site Design Group, and Living Habitats. Lakeside Alliance, which includes Turner Construction and a consortium of local African-American owned firms: Powers & Sons Construction, UJAMAA Construction, Brown & Momen, Safeway Construction, and Kates Security Services will build the center.

Two parks near the University of Chicago's campus, Jackson Park and Washington Park, were considered. On July 29, 2016, the foundation announced the selection of portion of Jackson Park in the Woodlawn neighborhood. Jackson Park, designed by landscape architect Frederick Law Olmsted for the 1893 World's Columbian Exposition, already houses the Museum of Science and Industry and a golf course.

Preliminary plans were unveiled in May 2017, involving three buildings in geometric shapes covered in light-colored stone, roughly 200,000 to 225,000 square feet (18,600 to 20,900 m^{2}). The museum building (which will also include educational and meeting space) will be the tallest, at 225 ft (69 m) high. This building is sometimes locally referred to as the "Obamalisk"; it has also been described as brutalist. The other buildings, a library building and a forum building, will be a single story. The latter building will feature an auditorium, a restaurant, and a public garden. In 2018, the center announced an agreement to place a Chicago Public Library branch within the complex.

The unveiled plan incorporates the Jackson Park end of Midway Plaisance from the north (which would be readapted as a circular green space surrounding a water basin), and the entirety of the park's hockey field and adjoining parkland to the south, where the main buildings and new park landscaping are to be sited. As part of a wider plan to reclaim parkland and improve park safety, the project also necessitates the closure, between 60th and 67th streets, of South Cornell Drive, a 6-lane thoroughfare that runs along the western park lagoon and the park's golf course from Midway Plaisance to South Shore. Without improvements to other roadways to accommodate local traffic, these closures will result in nine intersections in the area to exceed vehicle capacity, causing substantial traffic delays. These infrastructure changes would not be paid for by the Obama Foundation, and so would likely require government funding, expected to cost the city $175 million.

In 2024, a fourth building designed by Moody Nolan Chicago and Renauld Deandre Mitchell designated The Programs and Athletics Center broke ground on the 19.3-acre (7.8 ha) campus. To be called Home Court, the building is designed to include a regulation size basketball court and other athletic facilities and community meeting rooms.

On September 10, 2025, the Obama Foundation announced that it had commissioned ten artists to create 9 site-specific works for the Center. The artists are Nick Cave, Nekisha Durrett, Jenny Holzer, Jules Julien, Idris Khan, Aliza Nisenbaum, Jack Pierson, Alison Saar, Kiki Smith, and Marie Watt. (Cave and Watt will collaborate on one work.) They join Lindsay Adams, Spencer Finch, Richard Hunt, Maya Lin and Julie Mehretu who had previously been commissioned to create works.

On February 6, 2026, the Obama Foundation announced it had commissioned additional works for the center by Mark Bradford, Tyanna J. Buie, Jay Heikes, Carrie Mae Weems, and a collaboration between Sam Kirk and Dorian Sylvain.

On April 9, 2026, the Obama Foundation announced the final group of artists it had commissioned to create works for the Center would be Njideka Akunyili Crosby, María Magdalena Campos-Pons, Jeffrey Gibson, Rashid Johnson, Hugo McCloud, Martin Puryear, Lorna Simpson, and Norman Teague. Thirty artists are represented in the collection, which is distributed throughout the campus.

In May 2026, it was projected that the Presidential Center would get over 700,000 visitors each year.

Across the top of the museum tower's south and west sides, in concrete letters 5 feet high, are excerpts from Obama's 2015 speech commemorating the 50th anniversary of the civil rights marches from Selma to Montgomery, Alabama:

You are America. Unconstrained by habit and convention. Unencumbered by what is, ready to seize what ought to be. For everywhere in this country, there are first steps to be taken, there is new ground to cover, there are more bridges to be crossed. America is not the project of any one person. The single most powerful word in our democracy is the word "We." "We The People." "We Shall Overcome." "Yes We Can." That word is owned by no one. It belongs to everyone. Oh, what a glorious task we are given to continually try to improve this great nation of ours.

=== Critiques ===
The design of the tower museum building has drawn significant criticism. According to Edward Keegan, although unusual in shape, the tower design is conventional and traditional in the sense that its purpose is as a "treasure box museum", "solid and protective structures that express their architectural seriousness through the decoration of mostly unwindowed facades." Philip Kennicott concludes that the scale of the tower fits in with several nearby buildings in the neighborhood and much of it flows from the maxim "form follows function" as a museum; while acknowledging that some visitors would want and expect a monument and others only approve of traditional architecture, for him, the Center overall feels much like a grand modern public library and community center, and the tower is a "trim and neatly detailed structure", "tailored [and] understated".

Lee Bey, who was earlier critical of the tower, still laments its location but calls the tower "sculptural" (representing the coming together of cupped hands) and concludes it is "impressive" and "monumental" - the Center turned "a pleasant but quiet corner of Jackson Park into one of the best urban spaces in the city, maybe second only to Millennium Park." The "Center is a lovely gift to the city", according to Neil Steinberg, and the tower on approach, "surprising and dramatic, then marvelous". Oliver Wainwright, who disapproves of all presidential libraries, did not like the tower, calling it a "menacing sci-fi headquarters." According to him, detractors have lampooned the building as "the Obamalisk" and a "Klingon prison" topped with "an illegible sea of letters". While the architecture is "ambitious and formidable" and "built for the ages", the tower is "forbidding" and "brooding" in Michael Kimmelman's critical assessment but he found the Center's setting "lovely."

== Local reaction and concerns ==
The site of the Center, Jackson Park, lies at the intersection of three neighborhoods: the historically affluent, racially integrated Hyde Park and the more economically depressed, majority-African-American Woodlawn and South Shore. Thus, despite Obama's longtime residence in and association with Hyde Park, the Center's construction in Jackson Park has elicited widespread concerns about gentrification and the displacement of longtime South Side residents, especially African-American residents. A separate series of controversies have revolved around the Center's appropriation of public parkland.

=== Community benefits agreement ===
The Obama Library South Side Community Benefits Agreement Coalition, a coalition of 19 community and activist groups, is seeking a community benefits agreement to require that the Obama Foundation, in partnership with the City of Chicago, set aside jobs for residents in the local communities, protect low-income housing and home owners, support and create Black businesses, and strengthen neighborhood schools. Some residents have concerns about rising property taxes and rents that could displace many of the low-income Black residents. Recent rent increases for residents living directly across from the site escalated concerns of displacement of residents, particularly those who have fixed incomes, and has drawn protests against local Aldermen who are in opposition of a community benefits agreement. As of 2018, the Obama Foundation has so far refused to consider a community benefits agreement.

The foundation has announced plans for community hiring. An economic impact assessment estimates that about 28% of the 4,945 short-term construction jobs would go to South Side residents, with the remainder to the rest of Cook County. About 2,175 of the 2,536 long-term jobs would to go South Side residents, with the remainder to residents in rest of Cook County. It is estimated that the long-term jobs will bring in about $104 million in annual income to Cook County residents, or about $41,000 per job.

In July 2019, local aldermen Jeanette Taylor and Leslie Hairston introduced an ordinance aimed at protecting affordable housing near the development. The ordinance would require 30% of new units built in a 2-mile radius of the development to be affordable and offer right of first refusal for nearby tenants, among other benefits. The ordinance earned support from nearly 30 aldermen in Chicago City Council. In January 2020, Mayor Lori Lightfoot's administration announced that it would support a scaled-back version of a Community Benefits Agreement ordinance, but Taylor re-iterated support for the original ordinance.

In July 2020, the Lightfoot administration and aldermen Taylor agreed on a compromise ordinance that went further than the administration's earlier proposal. The compromise ordinance would require that 30% of units on 52 city-owned lots in Woodlawn be reserved for residents making between 30% and 50% of the Area Median Income, that any building refinanced through the Preservation of Existing Affordable Rentals program must reserve 10% of units for those making less than 30% of the AMI and 10% for those making less than 50% of the AMI, that the city's Housing Department request $675,000 in federal funds to support a local program to promote homeownership among current residents, and that eligibility restrictions be loosened for Woodlawn's Home Improvement Grant Program. The compromise was reached after negotiations between the administration, aldermen Taylor and Hairston, the CBA Coalition, and other community groups. Taylor called the compromise ordinance a "step in the right direction" and, along with members of the CBA coalition, called for further action.

In August 2025, some Chicago community leaders and longtime residents say the Center risks washing away the neighborhood's fabric and further warned that proposed developments tied to the project could price out families who have long called the South Side home. Residents raised concerns of being displaced as a result of the project.

=== Construction delays ===
When proposed in 2018, it was projected to open in 2021 but was delayed. Federal review did not end until December 2020; groundbreaking was in August 2021. Delays have been due to lawsuits and budget overruns. The center, on 19.3 acres, includes several buildings for the museum, library, foundation, community, and athletic facilities. Most of the land is being constructed as landscaped urban park with playgrounds and gardens, and includes the conversion of a previous roadway to parkland. The buildings and land are owned by the City of Chicago, with the foundation given a 99-year use, construction, and maintenance agreement.

=== Public land ===
The nonprofit group Friends of the Parks opposes the loss of parkland to build the center and had threatened a lawsuit to block development. In May 2018, the preservationist group "Protect Our Parks" filed a lawsuit, to prevent the part of Jackson Park, which dates from 1893, from being taken from the public and given to a private entity. Mayor Emanuel was critical of the lawsuit. Later that month, the plan to build the center was approved by the Chicago Plan Commission.

In early August 2018, the Chicago Park District began cutting trees to relocate park facilities, with the most notable being the Jackson Park athletic field. On September 17, 2018, the Chicago Park District suspended its construction related to the Center following meetings with the National Park Service and the Federal Highway Administration. On September 18, 2018, it was announced that the center will be owned by the city of Chicago once completed and that the Obama Foundation will not receive the tax-based operating or capital support, nor the perpetual leases which the 11 other museums in the city parks obtain.

Chicago mayor and former Obama White House chief of staff Rahm Emanuel submitted two ordinances to the Chicago City Council on September 20: the first would grant the Obama Foundation a 99-year lease on the Jackson Park site for $10.00 with various restrictions on the foundation's use, in return for the foundation's financial responsibility for maintaining and operating the city-owned project; the second allowed the city to plow under Cornell Drive from 59th Street to Hayes Drive in order to reconfigure this area as green space. The Chicago Department of Planning and Development (DPD) ordinance amended a 2015 agreement with the park district concerning the Obama Presidential Center. Under the new ordinance, the Presidential Center's museum was required to comply with the Museum Act's free admission days requirements. Identification would be required for some discounts. Parking fees for the center would also be regulated to be consistent with the rates charged at the Museum of Science and Industry or in the North Garage adjacent to the Field Museum. The ordinance also ensured that these parking fees would solely be used to finance the center's operations, maintenance, management, and endowment funding. On October 31, 2018, the Chicago city council unanimously approved the new proposals for the Obama Presidential Center. Mayor Emanuel afterwards read a letter of thanks written by former President Obama.

On October 24, 2018, U.S. District Judge John Robert Blakey held a status conference in the lawsuit filed by the group Protect Our Parks to prevent construction in Jackson Park. Blakey indicated that both sides wanted a quick resolution and the court would not delay the lawsuit. The city informed the court that they intend to seek a motion to dismiss after action by the City Council. Discovery continued during the next few months. On November 23, 2018, a motion was filed by the city of Chicago to dismiss the Protect Our Parks lawsuit. This request was denied on February 19, 2019, by Judge Blakey, allowing the lawsuit to proceed. On June 11, 2019, Judge Blakey ruled on the parties' cross-motions for summary judgment and granted judgment in favor of the City and against Protect our Parks, dismissing the lawsuit to block construction of the Obama Presidential Center in Jackson Park. The case was appealed to the U.S. Supreme Court in August 2021, which denied the requested injunction against the City.

=== Other reactions ===
Some University of Chicago faculty members signed a letter stating concerns about the design, raised questions about the estimated cost of transportation improvements, and stated that the plan is an "object-lesson in the mistakes of the past". A counter-letter in support of the Obama Center was signed by other faculty in response. The independent campus student newspaper, The Chicago Maroon wrote an editorial in support of the center that criticized the concerns raised by some faculty.

== Construction and fundraising ==
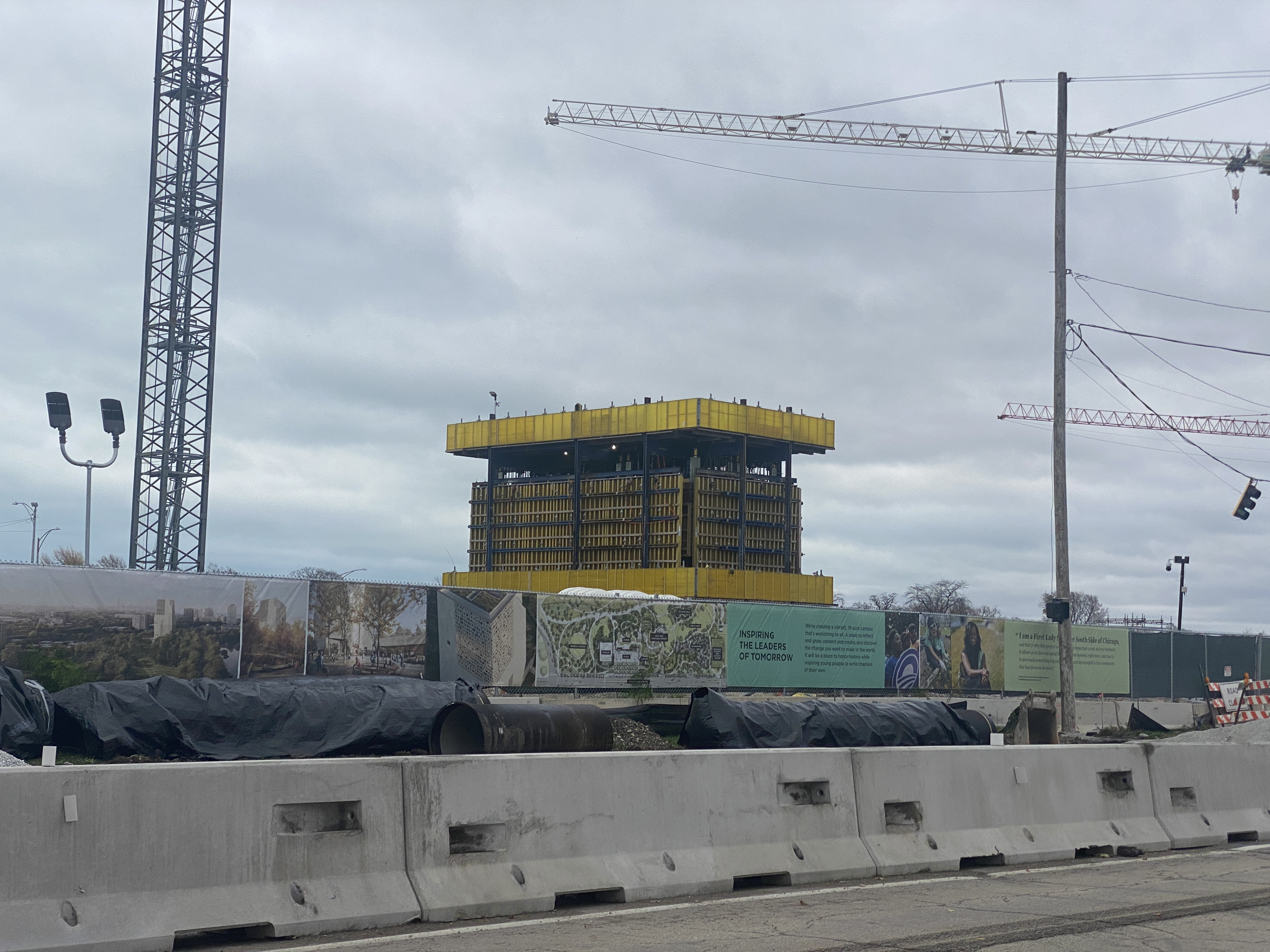
Construction in November 2022

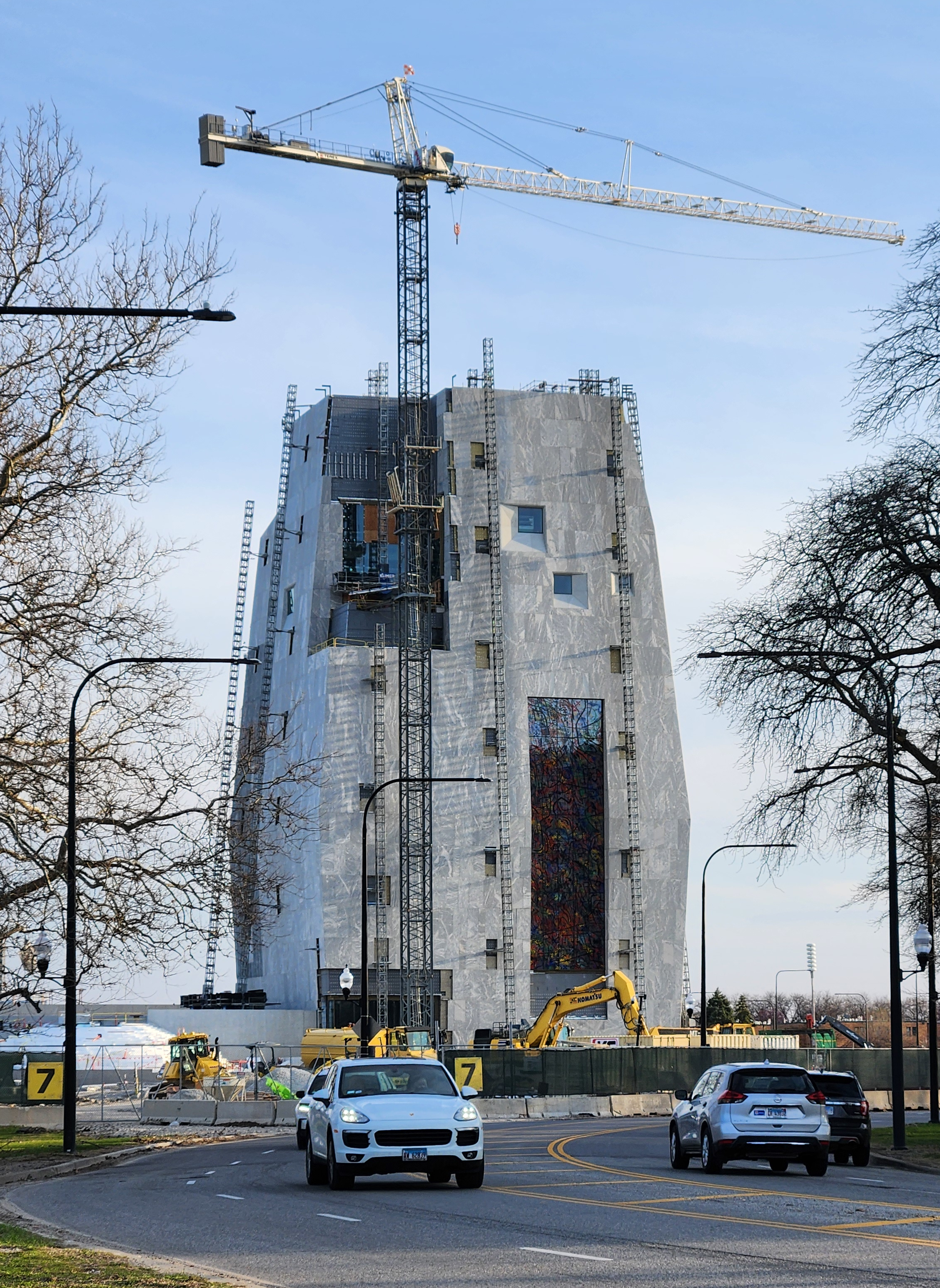
Construction in April 2025

Construction of the center was originally expected to begin in late 2018 and be completed in 2020 or 2021. A federal review of the project began in late 2017, responding to the local criticism and attempting to assess whether the project affects Jackson Park's status on the National Register of Historic Places. Tod Williams Billie Tsien Architects released the concept design for the center in 2017. The architects said in February 2017 that construction of the center's museum and library would likely approach $300 million, and that the center would likely need an endowment of $1.5 billion. In 2017, Obama reportedly was set to engage in a major fundraising effort for the center. On July 27, 2018, the Obama Foundation announced that groundbreaking for the center would be delayed until sometime in 2019, and the center would not open in 2021, as was initially planned.

The foundation's 2017 annual report, and its 2017 IRS filing, show that the Obama Foundation raised $232.6 million, on expenses of $23 million. The year after Obama left office was the first year the foundation lifted a cap on donations. While it lists its donors on its website, it no longer specifically linked donors to exact amounts. While the Chicago city government had not promised that the foundation's endowment details will be disclosed publicly, its agreement with the foundation requires that the foundation may not proceed with construction of the center until the building endowment is secured. On June 3, 2019, it was announced that a $5 million grant had been issued to the city of Chicago by the MacArthur Foundation for plans to build the new Chicago Public Library branch at the site of the proposed Obama Presidential Center. Construction began in August 2021. On September 28, 2021, the Obamas, Illinois Governor J.B. Pritzker and Lightfoot participated in the groundbreaking ceremony.

In November 2022, construction of the library was temporarily halted for several days, after a noose was found on site. A topping out ceremony was held in June 2024 for the center's tower. Installation of "Uprising of the Sun", an 83 ft. by 25 ft. painted glass window for the tower by artist Julie Mehretu was completed in September. Additional artwork at the Center is planned to include a sculpture by Richard Hunt, and a water feature by Maya Lin.

On May 3, 2025, Lori Healey, who oversaw construction of the Obama Presidential Center, died.

As of September 30, 2025, Emily Bittner, a spokesperson for the Obama Foundation pegged final all-in project costs for the Presidential Center to be $850 million.

=== Obama presidential documents and artifacts ===
The papers and artifacts from the Obama administration are being stored and processed inside a secure facility located at 2500 W. Golf Rd in suburban Hoffman Estates, northwest of Chicago's O'Hare International Airport. The records are to be digitized and stored in existing NARA facilities. Starting in 2022, they became subject to Freedom of Information Act requests.

== Federal review ==
The federal government began a review of this project in 2017 because of Jackson Park's historic designation and potential changes to the roadways in and around the park. The review concluded four years later in 2021, and some design changes were made to meet objections raised in the review.

In May 2018, the City of Chicago agreed to lease the land, 19.3 acres (7.8 ha), to the OPC for 99 years. Once the construction is completed, the City of Chicago will own the center, per that 2018 city council agreement. The mayor of Chicago has had concerns for homeowners in the area, leading the City Council to agree to spend funds to keep people in their homes or aid them in buying other homes.

Concerns about gentrification of the neighborhood around the OPC and Jackson Park led to an agreement in August 2020 regarding home improvement funds for homes in Woodlawn. "In July, city officials negotiated a deal that will require developers to include affordable housing for projects on city-owned property in Woodlawn. The agreement, worked out with residents and the local alderman, will also provide up to $20,000 in funding for home improvement work to some homeowners."

Those who favor this project see it as a huge investment in the South Side, with the new public library branch, as well as the Obama Presidential Center itself, immediate benefits in jobs and when the project is completed.

== Opening ==
The ceremony formally dedicating the Obama Presidential Center was held at John Lewis Plaza on June 18, 2026. During the ceremony, Barack and Michelle Obama — as well as their daughters, Malia and Sasha, and two Obama Foundation officials, CEO Valerie Jarrett and board chair Martin Nesbitt — shared the stage with former U.S. presidents Bill Clinton, George W. Bush and Joe Biden (who served as vice president under Obama) and former U.S. first ladies Hillary Clinton (who served as secretary of state under Obama), Laura Bush and Jill Biden. Earlier, the Obamas gave the Clintons, Bushes and Bidens a private tour of the center.

The ceremony also featured performances from various music artists, such as Jennifer Hudson, the Roots, Bruce Springsteen, Stevie Wonder, Christina Aguilera, Common, Eddie Vedder, John Legend, Marc Anthony, Tems, U2's Bono and the Edge, and actress and producer Marsai Martin. Rahm Emanuel (who served as White House chief of staff under Obama and who as Mayor of Chicago was instrumental in bringing the museum to the city), Bill Daley (who also served as White House chief of staff under Obama), Angela Merkel, Justin Trudeau, Matteo Renzi, Nancy Pelosi, Hakeem Jeffries, Kamala Harris and Doug Emhoff, JB Pritzker, Brandon Johnson, Gavin Newsom, Josh Shapiro, Mark Kelly and Gabby Giffords, Andrew Young, Cindy McCain, Al Sharpton, Oprah Winfrey, Steven Spielberg, Tom Hanks and Rita Wilson, Tyler Perry, LL Cool J, David Letterman, Conan O’Brien, Stephen Colbert, Billie Jean King, Tom Ricketts, George Lucas, Mark Hamill and LaShawn Ford were among those in attendance as well. The Obamas, Jarrett, and Nesbitt delivered remarks. 6,300 invitees were estimated to be in attendance at John Lewis Plaza. Thousands more attended the free official jumbotron watch party held at nearby Midway Plaisance Park, where many danced and sang and patronized local businesses invited to set up stands and food trucks; several live scenes and interview segments from the party were relayed back into the screen at the plaza during the dedication ceremony. The center opened to the general public on Juneteenth, June 19, 2026. The Obamas, Brandon Johnson and Bill Daley were in attendance for this event as well.

== See also ==
- Presidential Records Act
- Statue of Barack and Michelle Obama
- Torch Song (sculpture)
