= Strautmanis =

Strautmanis is a surname. Notable people with the surname include:

- Augusts Strautmanis (1907–1990), Latvian chess player
- Michael Strautmanis (born 1969), American lawyer
