= Sam Kirk =

Artist (b. 1981)

- Born: 1981 (age 44–45); Chicago, IL
- Education: Columbia College Chicago; International Academy of Design and Technology

Samantha "Sam" Kirk (born in 1981 in Chicago, Illinois) is a biracial, queer, American artist. She formerly worked in the advertising industry for ten years before pursuing an art career. She explores her mixed race, culture, and queer identity through many different art mediums including digital art, murals, and illustrations.

== Biography ==
Samantha Kirk was born in Chicago in 1981. As she was growing up, Kirk's family moved to different neighborhoods in the Chicago area, inspiring her to observe the changing scenery and different human experiences of those around her. Her experiences in these neighborhoods, namely the Pilsen Historic District, inspired her future murals. In Kirk's sophomore year of high school, she discovered art as an outlet for her to communicate her queer identity which she later integrated into her artwork. Kirk graduated from the International Academy of Art & Design earning her BFA in Interior Architecture in 2002 and later went on to earn her BA in Marketing Communication at Columbia College in 2004. Later in life, Kirk worked in the advertising industry as an integrated marketing specialist for ten years, eventually leaving the industry. Kirk felt the advertising industry no longer challenged her and was not paying enough. In 2010, the opportunity to pursue an art career presented itself when she was offered two huge art commissions.

== Murals ==
=== Logan Square Mural (2017) ===
Kirk and Antongiorgi collaborated once again to create Logan Square Mural. This mural highlights the culture that once thrived at Logan Square before being gentrified. Kirk and Antongiorgi wanted people to take a step back to understand the mural and attempt to understand each other's differences. The mural displays three oversized individuals (one male and two females) surrounded by gray and brick red buildings and yellow metro tracks above. Below the three individuals, there are small people playing with a fire hydrant, selling ice cream, protesting, and driving a car. Around all of them are palm trees and city signs that read "Wilsure Hotel" & "Furniture". This mural was funded by Ramirez-Rosa by $20,000 in city money to celebrate “the diversity and history of Logan Square".

=== Sister Cities (2018) ===
Kirk became the first woman invited to participate in the Casablanca street art festival, CasaMouja, for which she painted a 28 ft x 50 ft mural to celebrate 35 years of Chicago Casablanca Sister Cities International exchange. The mural depicts two women facing opposite directions, highlights the connection between the two cities though miles apart. The project was curated by Neysa Page-Lieberman, chief curator for the Wabash Arts Corridor in downtown Chicago.

=== The Love I Vibrate (2018) ===
Kirk collaborated with Andy Bellomo and Sandra Antongiorgi to create The Love I Vibrate, a mural is to honor non-binary community members and Chicago's LGBTQ community. The Love I Vibrate is on the side of the Howard Brown Health Clinic in Chicago. The mural displays swirls of pink, blue, purple, and gold with a non-binary individual in the center with a shaved head and lips painted gold and eyes hot pink. This mural was funded by the City of Chicago Department of Cultural Affairs.

=== A Tribute to Victoria Cruz (2019) ===
Kirk was one of fifty international artists selected by the city of New York to paint a mural in the city as part of WorldPride 2019. She selected Victoria Cruz as the subject of her mural to celebrate Transgender Women of color and to feature a living person.

== Pilsen Neighborhood Involvement and Murals ==
In her adult life, Kirk has painted murals in the neighborhood of Pilsen, Chicago aimed towards inclusion and celebration of the LQBTQ+ community. Kirk has a connection to this neighborhood not only being born in Chicago but also facing hate crimes in this neighborhood as a teen due to her sexual orientation. As a teen, Kirk was beaten unconscious for being gay on 19th Street and Ashland Avenue. In 2021, Kirk returned to the Pilsen neighborhood and created a mural celebrating LGBTQ pride just blocks from where this attack had occurred years earlier.

=== Do You Think Balloons Cry When You Let Them Go? (2012) ===
Kirk and her assistant Eva Cancino worked together to create the Do You Think Balloons Cry When You Let Them Go? mural. The goal of this particular mural is to raise awareness for homeless youth in the neighborhood. The mural displays two skeleton figures representing the homeless youth of Chicago reaching out to grab balloons that are slipping out of their reach. In the center of the mural there is a black and white depiction of buildings in Chicago.

=== Searching for Mentors in Memories (2016) ===
Kirk created this mural as a part of the “Mujeres Poderosas” Exhibit at Polsen Outpost in 2016. The goal of this exhibit and mural is to show empowered women in the Latina community. The mural shows two figures; on the left a young girl with brown, blue, pink, and yellow skin—a symbol of the bi-racial identity and on the right a larger figure of Frida Kahlo with red hair, jewelry made of skulls, and blue, brown, tan, and pink skin. Connecting these figures there is a banner reading “Searching for Mentors in Memories.” The young girl can be seen looking up towards Frida Kahlo who is looking back at her. This intergenerational exchange reflects Kirks hope that young Latina women of today can look for inspiration and empowerment from Latina women of the past.

=== Weaving Cultures (2016) ===
Kirk collaborated with Sandra Antongiorgi to create the Weaving Cultures mural. This brought awareness to the Chicago community about women growing up racially mixed and queer. The mural includes five women of different racial ethnicities and ages, including one transgender woman, all on a teal abstract background. All women displaying a stoic expression. The mural can be found on 16th and Blue Island in Chicago, Illiones.

=== Fierce (2021) ===
This mural was created in June 2021 during Pride to celebrate the Queer community in countries and cultures across the globe. The location of this mural is one block away from where Kirk was beaten due to her queer identity when she was younger. This mural has a celebratory tone, featuring queer individuals dancing, talking, and posing while surrounded by the bright colors of the Progress Pride flag. These colorful individuals are surrounded by black and white outlines of traditional Mexican figures such as the Virgin of Guadaloupe and a Mariachi suit with skulls on it. This side by side coexistence shows the intersectionality and diversity of queerness seen in Pilsen and around the world.

=== Pilseneros ===
Kirk depicts a colorful scene of the Pilsen neighborhood in this mural. A paletero (ice-rceam man) is seen pushing his cart and children are riding bicycles and playing in the background. The colors used in this mural are vibrant and lively, showing the bustling community life of Pilsen. A street sign on the right ride of the mural further solidifies that this scene is one of the Pilsen neighborhood showing that the scene is at the intersection of "Cermak" and "Paulina."

== Group exhibitions ==
=== ICONIC Black Panther ===
- Dates: November 2, 2018 – January 6, 2019
- Objective: Recognition of the past century influential political movements.

=== Peeling off the Grey ===
- Dates: May 11, 2018 - February 3, 2019
- Objective: Breaking down the layers of gentrification in Pilsen. Artwork is meant to represent the heartache and turmoil felt by the community of Pilsen, Chicago.

== Solo exhibitions ==
=== Double Dutch: An Exhibition by Sam Kirk ===
- 2016: Displayed through illustrations, paintings, and interactive artworks, Kirk shows her appreciation for Chicago & New York. Also shows how Kirk jumped between both cities as she discovered her identity and love.

== Commissions ==
On February 6, 2026, the Obama Foundation announced that it had commissioned Kirk, along with Dorian Sylvain, to create a work for the Obama Presidential Center. Kirk and Sylvain’s work will be a mural in the Center’s athletic facility.

== Collections ==
Kirk has works in the permanent collection at the National Museum of Mexican Art in Chicago.

== Honors and awards ==
- 2023: Leppen Leadership Award
- 2021: Human First Award, Telley Award (Color of Tomorrow), Communicator Award (Color of Tomorrow), LGBT State of Illinois Honoree
- 2020: Davey Silver Award (Color of Tomorrow), Human First Award
- 2018: Chicago Revueltas Award
- 2017: 3Arts Make a Wave Award
- 2014: Curators Choice Award

== Bibliography ==
- Keenan Teddy Smith (2018). "Challenging the Narrative of “Gentrification as Development” in Chicago", Hypoallergenic
- Ana Belaval (2018). "El Paseo Boricua welcomes new addition to public art that celebrates Latin cultures", WGN9 News
- Vanessa Buneger (2018). "Pilsen Fest x Sam Kirk: How Art and Collaboration Can Make Change in Our City", Ideas Blog
- Casera (CASH) Heining, (2018). "Sam Kirk | The importance of women of color in queer spaces, current residency at Chicago Art Department, and more", WGN Radio
- Marissa N. Isang (2017). "Public art display celebrates Hispanic Heritage with 16 unique doors", ABC 7 News
- Kim Janssen (2017). "City-funded Logan Square mural a response to gentrification, alderman says", Chicago Tribune
- Alfonso Gutierrez (2017). "Arte inspirado en Dolores Huerta en Chicago", Telemundo Chicago
- Columbia College Alumni (2017). "Colum Alum Spotlight: Sam Kirk '05", Columbia College Alumni
- K. GUZMAN ⋅(2016). "Lesbian Couple Releases Greeting Card Line for Queers of Color", TheLstop
- Sharyn Jackson, Gena Hymowech, and Kat Long (2015). "100 Women We Love 2015", GOMAG
- Claire Schubert (2015). "Through Eyes of Culture", Dekit Magazine
- Danielle Evenski (2015)."CELEBRA LO RICO: JOIN MORENA CUADRA FOR A CUP OF COFFEE WITH SAM KIRK", QUE RICA VIDA
- Ross Forman (2014). "Chicagoan Sam Kirk shines through art", Windy City Times
