= My Brother's Keeper Challenge =

Public-private partnership in the United States

My Brother's Keeper
- Formation: 2013; 13 years ago
- Founder: Barack Obama
- Legal status: Active
- Headquarters: United States

My Brother's Keeper Challenge is a public–private partnership of the United States federal government that promotes intervention by civic leaders in the lives of young men of color. The program was initiated in 2014 with sponsorship from the White House, the United States Department of Education, and the National Convening Council. The initiative obtained pledges by nonprofit organizations of $200 million over five years. The program was intended to be a call to action for mayors, Native American tribal leaders, county executives, and other municipal leaders to address persistent opportunity gaps for young men of color and help them reach their potential.

In 2017, the My Brother's Keeper Alliance (MBK Alliance) became a core initiative of the Obama Foundation, expanding upon the original My Brother's Keeper Challenge launched in 2014. The MBK Alliance focuses on addressing persistent opportunity gaps faced by boys and young men of color by supporting communities in implementing evidence-based solutions to improve life outcomes.

The partnership was expanded one year after program launch, with $100 million in additional funding from private entities. Private partners have included the College Board, Citi Foundation, AT&T, Discovery Communications, and the Emerson Collective. Youth Guidance's Becoming a Man program is an example of a recipient of funding from the My Brother's Keeper Challenge. The Boys of Color Collaboration is another example, pooling scholars from several universities.

The White House issued a one-year progress report on the My Brother's Keeper Challenge in March 2015.

== Mission and objectives ==
The MBK Alliance's mission is to build safe and supportive communities where boys and young men of color feel valued and have clear pathways to opportunity. The initiative works through partnerships with local governments, businesses, nonprofits, and individuals to drive sustainable, community-based change.

The MBK Alliance is structured around six key milestones that are considered critical for the success of boys and young men of color:

1. Getting a healthy start and entering school ready to learn
2. Reading at grade level by third grade
3. Graduating from high school ready for college and career
4. Completing post-secondary education or training
5. Successfully entering the workforce with the skills needed for long-term employment
6. Keeping youth on track and giving them second chances

== MBK Model Communities ==
In 2018, the MBK Alliance launched the MBK Model Communities initiative, selecting 19 organizations across 10 states and Puerto Rico to serve as national models for improving outcomes for boys and young men of color. These communities focus on reducing youth violence, enhancing mentorship programs, and supporting educational achievement.

As of May 2024, the MBK Alliance had recognized four MBK Model Communities for their commitment to the initiative's milestones:

- Newark, New Jersey
- Omaha, Nebraska
- Tulsa, Oklahoma
- Yonkers, New York

== Community engagement and impact ==
Nearly 250 MBK Communities have participated in the My Brother's Keeper Community Challenge. The alliance provides these communities with resources, tools, and opportunities to share best practices and scale effective interventions.

== See also ==
- Big Brothers Big Sisters of America
- 100 Black Men of America
