= Statue of Barack and Michelle Obama =

Artwork in Chicago, Illinois, U.S.

- The statue in 2026
- Subject: Barack Obama; Michelle Obama
- Location: Chicago, Illinois, U.S.; 41.786°N 87.586°W

A bronze statue of Barack and Michelle Obama is installed outside the Museum Tower at the Barack Obama Presidential Center in Chicago, Illinois, United States. The approximately 7-foot-tall (2.1 m) sculpture depicts the couple at the 2009 inauguration parade. Created by Brooklyn-based design studio StudioEIS, the work weighs approximately 1,200 pounds (540 kg). Many people wait in line to take photographs with the artwork.

== See also ==
- List of sculptures of presidents of the United States
- List of things named after Barack Obama
