= Shivon Zilis =

Canadian technology executive and venture capitalist (born 1986)

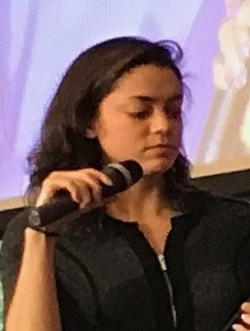
- Zilis in 2017
- Born: Shivon Alice Zilis; February 8, 1986 (age 40); Markham, Ontario, Canada
- Education: Yale University (BA)
- Children: 4

Shivon Alice Zilis (born February 8, 1986) is a Canadian technology executive and venture capitalist.

== Early life and education ==
Shivon Zilis was born in Markham, Ontario, Canada, to Richard and Sharda Zilis. Her mother is of Indian origin, while her father, Richard, is Caucasian Canadian. Zilis graduated from Markham's Unionville High School. She attended Yale University, graduating in 2008 with degrees in economics and philosophy. As a goaltender on Yale's ice hockey team, she became the school's all-time leader in goals-against average.

== Career ==
After graduating from Yale, Zilis started her career at IBM in New York, working in financial technologies in developing countries, especially Peru and Indonesia. From 2012 to 2018, she was one of the founding investors and partner of Bloomberg Beta, funded by Bloomberg L.P., utilizing what she calls "machine intelligence".

From 2017 to 2019, Zilis served as a project director for Tesla, Inc.'s Autopilot product and chip design team.

Zilis served as director of operations and special projects at Neuralink. Zilis met Elon Musk through her non-profit work at OpenAI, where she served as a board member until 2023. Zillis's tenure on the board later was scrutinized in a lawsuit Musk filed against OpenAI. According to text messages that came out in discovery from OpenAI's lawyers, Zillis acted as an agent for Musk while simultaneously serving on OpenAI's board and being in a romantic relationship with Musk. She wrote that she was "keeping the info flowing" to Musk about internal goings-on at OpenAI.

Zilis joined the board of defense technology company Shield AI in September 2023. She had previously written the company's term sheet for a seed round in 2016 while she was at Bloomberg Beta.

== Awards and honors ==
In 2015, Zilis was listed on the Forbes 30 Under 30 list of venture capitalists. Zilis was named among LinkedIn's 35 Under 35.

== Personal life ==
In July 2022, court documents in Travis County, Texas, revealed that Zilis and Elon Musk had twin children, a son and a daughter, in November 2021. The twins were conceived via in vitro fertilization (IVF). According to a court petition to change the twins' names, Musk and Zilis listed the same address in Austin. Elon Musk had his second child with Grimes, a Canadian singer-songwriter, via surrogate, in December 2021, with Walter Isaacson's biography of Elon Musk stating Grimes did not know about Musk's children with Shivon Zilis.

In June 2024, it was reported that Shivon Zilis had a third child with Musk. It was later revealed that in September that year her partner Elon Musk was also having another child with influencer Ashley St. Clair.

On February 28, 2025, Zilis announced the birth of her fourth child, a son who was conceived via IVF with Musk. The middle name Sekhar was given to one of their children, after the Nobel laureate Subrahmanyan Chandrasekhar. On February 1, 2026, Zilis and Musk attended White House Deputy Chief of Staff Dan Scavino's wedding together at Mar-a-Lago.

In October 2026, Zilis announced that her relationship with Elon Musk had ended. She said the separation had occurred suddenly and expressed hope that they would remain friends and co-parents to their four children.
