= 59th/60th Street/University of Chicago station =

Commuter rail station in Chicago, Illinois

59th/60th UChicago

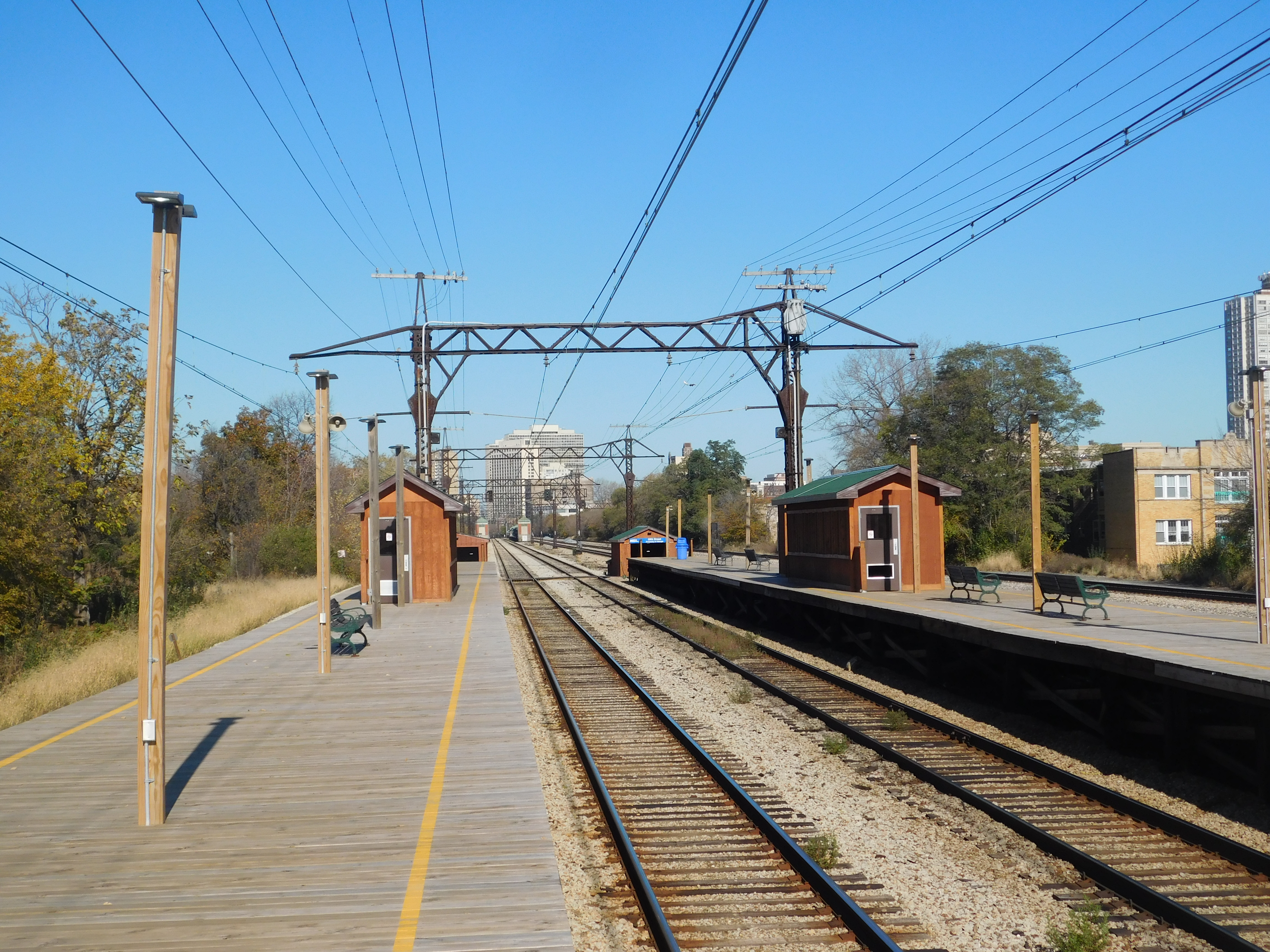
- The platforms of the Metra Electric station at 59th Street and University of Chicago

General information
- Location: 59th and Harper Streets; Hyde Park, Chicago, Illinois
- Coordinates: 41.7877°N 87.5888°W
- Line: University Park Sub District
- Platforms: 2 island platforms
- Tracks: 4
- Connections: CTA Bus

Construction
- Accessible: No

Other information
- Fare zone: 2

History
- Electrified: 1926
- Former names: South Park; 59th Street–Stony Island

Passengers
- 2018: 812 (average weekday) ▲20.5%
- Rank: 63 out of 236

Services
Preceding station	Metra	Following station
63rd Street toward University Park, South Chicago or Blue Island	Metra Electric	55th/56th/57th Street toward Millennium
Former services
Preceding station	Illinois Central Railroad	Following station
63rd Street toward Richton, 91st Street or Blue Island	Electric Suburban	55th–56th–57th Streets toward Randolph Street
Track layout
Location

59th Street/University of Chicago is a railway station that serves the Metra Electric District in Chicago, Illinois. The station is on 59th street, originally the University of Chicago's southern border, and the Midway Plaisance. To the north, trains run to Millennium Station downtown, to the south they run to University Park, Illinois.

As of 2018, the station is the 63rd busiest of Metra's 236 non-downtown stations, with an average of 812 weekday boardings. Before the 55th–56th–57th Street station to the immediate north was rebuilt into a major station in 2002, all express trains served 59th Street and the station had a staffed ticket window.

In June 2026 Metra announced that all weekday trains will stop at 59th/University of Chicago. The increased service aligns with the opening of the Obama Presidential Center across the street.

== Future ==
Metra plans to rebuild the station, which will incorporate ADA accessibility and reopen the 60th Street entrance south of the Midway Plaisance. In 2011, the University of Chicago committed $2.5 million on the planned rebuild. Due to the station being in proximity to historic places, in 2021, Metra and the Federal Transit Administration began a federal review process in accordance with Section 106 of the National Historic Preservation Act. In December 2022, the project received $37.6 million in federal grant.

Construction was initially scheduled to begin in 2020 but was delayed to the summer of 2026. The project is anticipated to cost $78 million, and the renovation will be finished in early 2030.

== Bus connections ==
CTA

- 2 Hyde Park Express
- 6 Jackson Park Express
- 15 Jeffery Local
- 28 Stony Island
