= Kenvi Phillips =

American librarian

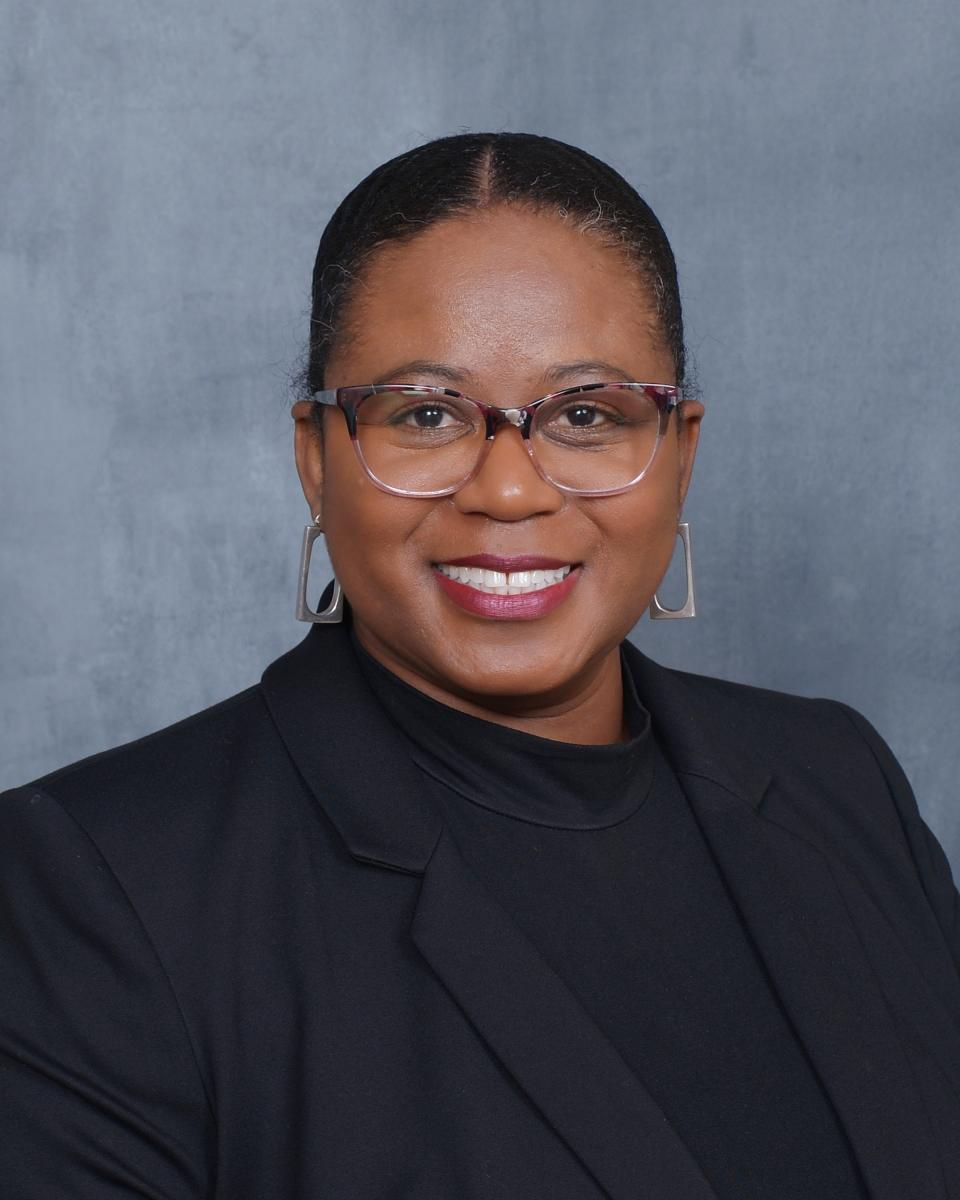
- Education: Howard University, PhD
- Alma mater: University of Tulsa
- Occupation: Director of the Barack Obama Presidential Library

Kenvi Phillips is an American librarian serving as the inaugural director of the Barack Obama Presidential Library since June 16, 2024.

== Education and career ==
Phillips earned a B.A. in history at the University of Tulsa, the M.A. in Public History and the PhD in American History from Howard University.

She was Historian at the Maryland-National Capital Park and Planning Commission from 2009 to 2013. She worked as Assistant Librarian at the Moorland-Spingarn Research Center at Howard University from 2013 to 2016.

She was the Johanna-Marie Frankel Curator for Race and Ethnicity at the Schlesinger Library of Harvard University from 2016 to 2021.

Phillips was Director of Diversity, Equity, and Inclusion for Brown University Libraries from 2021 to 2024.

She is Associate Editor of the Library History Round Table journal, Libraries: Culture, History, & Society.

== Presentations ==
In 2015 she presented at the Digital Initiatives Symposium on "Digitizing the Black Experience: The Building of 'Digital Howard' and the 'Portal to the Black Experience.'"

As part of the National Women's History Museum Centenary Celebration Series, "Determined to Rise": Women's Historical Activism for Equal Rights" in August 2020 Phillips presented on "Chicago's African American Women in the Fight for the Vote."
