= Brian Chesky =

American businessman (born 1981)

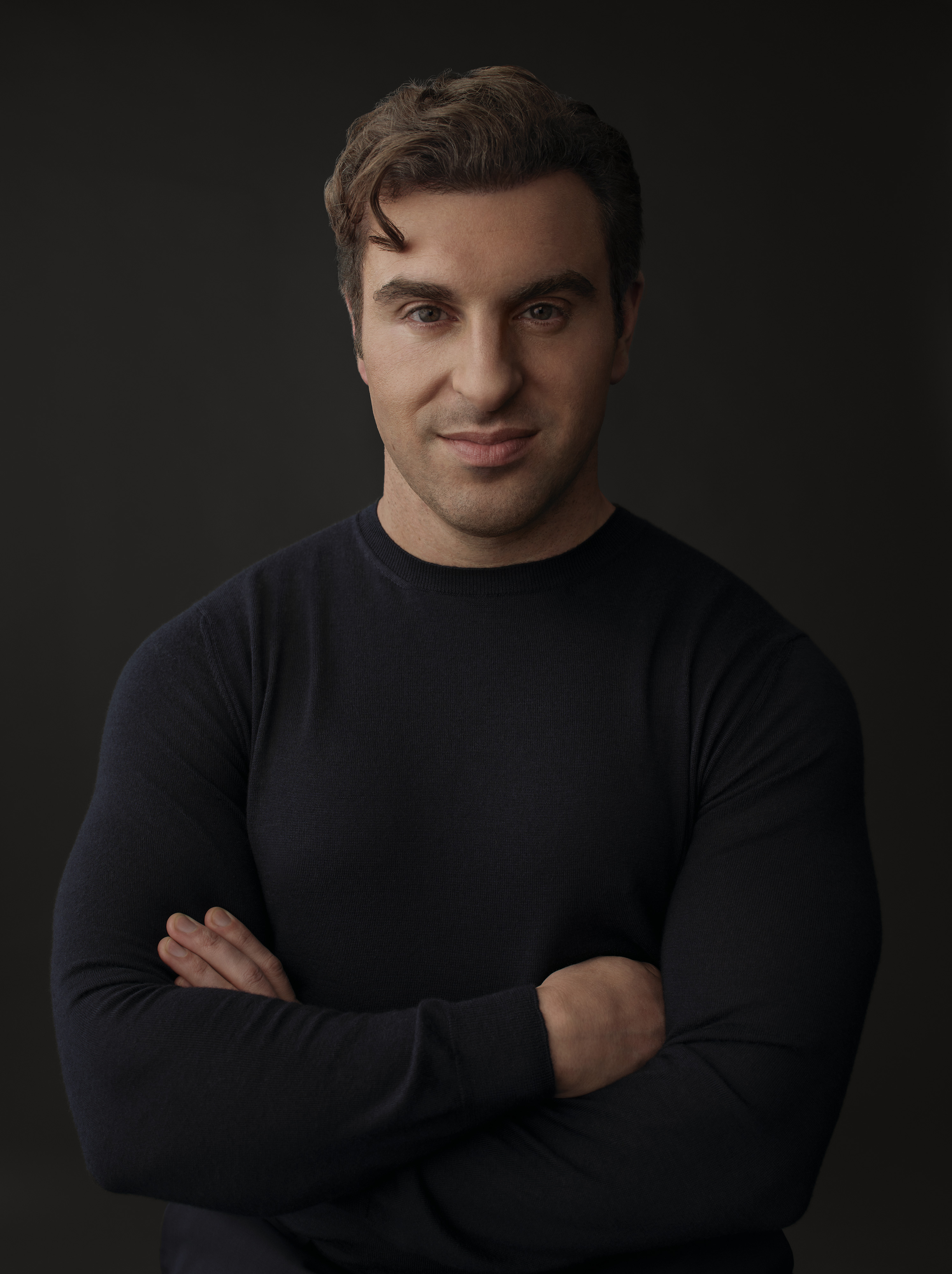
- Chesky in 2025
- Born: Brian Joseph Chesky; August 29, 1981 (age 45); Niskayuna, New York, U.S.
- Education: Rhode Island School of Design (BFA)
- Occupations: Industrial designer; businessman
- Known for: Co-founder and CEO of Airbnb

Brian Joseph Chesky (born August 29, 1981) is an American businessman, industrial designer, and the co-founder and CEO of Airbnb. Chesky is the 290th richest person in the world according to Forbes, with a net worth of $9.2 billion, largely due to his 10 percent ownership stake in Airbnb.

== Early life ==
Brian Chesky was born on August 29, 1981, in Niskayuna, New York, the son of Deborah and Robert Chesky. His father is of Polish origin, and his mother of Italian origin. Chesky's parents were both social workers. He has a younger sister, Allison. Chesky enjoys sketching and bonsai. He later acquired Polish and French citizenship through the naturalization of his parents. In discussing his childhood in a January 2026 interview with Debbie Millman on Design Matters, Chesky stated, "I'm not religious, but I went to religious classes a little bit."

In his youth, Chesky was captain of some of the ice hockey teams he was on. He developed an interest in art in his teens and cited Leonardo da Vinci as an early inspiration. He drew replicas of paintings, and redesigned toys and athletic shoes. In an interview with The New York Times, he said he watched friends of his parents redesign their backyard, which led to an interest in landscape architecture and later urban planning.

== Education ==
Chesky graduated from Niskayuna High School in 1999 and graduated from the Rhode Island School of Design (RISD) in 2004 with a Bachelor of Fine Arts degree in industrial design. While studying at RISD, Chesky was influenced by the works of Charles Eames, Ray Eames, and Walt Disney. He was captain of the RISD hockey team and was a competitive bodybuilder. Chesky was also the designer of the unofficial mascot of RISD, Scrotie.

== Career ==
Chesky moved to Los Angeles following graduation from RISD to work for 3DID as an industrial designer. He designed toys, guitars, medical equipment, and other items at 3DID. Chesky became disillusioned with the job and long commutes, particularly after being part of a team that worked on the Pureflush toilet seat for the television show American Inventor. He reduced his hours at 3DID in 2007 to work on furniture designs.

In October 2007, he moved to San Francisco to live with RISD classmate Joe Gebbia. Chesky did not have enough money to pay his rent, and they opened their house to short-term renters as a bed and breakfast, providing air mattresses for guests to sleep on and Pop-Tarts for breakfast during the Industrial Designers Society of America conference, when hotel rooms were scarce. The business became Airbnb.

Gebbia and Chesky asked Nathan Blecharczyk to work on a new website for the company, then known as Airbed & Breakfast. The site launched before 2008's South by Southwest (SXSW) in Austin, Texas, and generated two bookings, one of which was Chesky. He met Michael Seibel at SXSW, who would later connect him with Y Combinator and led to significant investment for Airbnb. The company re-launched again before the 2008 Democratic National Convention in Denver, Colorado. It was featured in TechCrunch, driving so much traffic to the company website that it crashed. Chesky and his partners targeted microblogs to advertise the service, which led to a trickle-up to larger Denver-area publications including the Denver Post, then national publications including The New York Times. The strategy led to 800 room listings and 80 guest bookings.

Chesky and Gebbia had US$20,000 in debt each after the Democratic National Convention. They developed and designed election-themed cereal boxes to generate funds. They purchased 1,000 boxes of commercial cereals and repackaged them as "Obama O's" and "Cap'n McCains". Sales of the rebranded cereal generated between US$20,000–US$30,000 and allowed the two to pay most of their debts.

In early 2009, Chesky, Gebbia, and Blecharczyk enrolled in a Y Combinator startup course. The course provided US$20,000 in seed money and training from Paul Graham, among others, in exchange for a six-percent stake in the company. Sequoia Capital partner Greg McAdoo invested US$585,000 in what was now known as Airbnb at the end of the course. The company continued to operate out of Chesky's and Gebbia's apartment, with Chesky eventually moving out to live in locations for rent on the platform. He assumed the title of chief executive officer of Airbnb in fall 2010. In 2011, Chesky and the cofounders decided against purchasing Wimdu, a rival firm heavily funded by Rocket Internet. Instead, Airbnb purchased Accoleo, a German imitator, and began a rapid expansion in Europe.

Chesky wrote blog posts about Airbnb's efforts to rectify issues after a host's house was vandalized in 2011. He was criticized for his handling of the situation after his comments were publicly contradicted by the victim. This led to Chesky writing a public message acknowledging his failure, the expansion of the Airbnb customer service team, and the creation of a fund for hosts should similar situations arise in the future. According to journalist Leigh Gallagher, Chesky considered the moment a "rebirth" for Airbnb.

During the coronavirus pandemic, Airbnb underwent significant restructuring, eliminating several departmental divisions and laying off approximately 1,900 employees. The company offered severance packages that included extended health care benefits and published a directory of affected employees. Chesky also took a more direct role in daily operations, involving senior leadership in broader company projects.

In December 2020, Airbnb became a public company via an initial public offering. Fortune ranked Chesky No. 43 on its "100 Most Powerful People in Business" in 2024.

== Founder mode ==
In September 2024, Chesky gave a 2-hour talk at a Y Combinator event on his leadership style, later coined "founder mode" by American computer scientist Paul Graham in an essay. Chesky's talk garnered attention quickly and became the subject of widespread discussion and memes. Reactions were mixed, with some noting that women were not allowed to lead in founder mode in the same way as men, while others criticized founder mode as "another misguided attempt to break down leadership into two binary personas" or a rebranding of micromanagement. Chesky responded to these criticisms by saying that the viral nature of Graham's essay led to a mistaken association between founder mode and "swagger", noting that founder mode was about company leadership maintaining expertise in its products and projects instead of micromanaging employees, and that a cultural change was needed so women would feel empowered to use the founder mode approach in their leadership.

== Recognition ==
In 2015, Chesky was included on the Forbes list of America's Richest Entrepreneurs Under 40. Chesky was recognized on the Time 100 for 2015. In May 2015, President Barack Obama named Chesky a Presidential Ambassador for Global Entrepreneurship. In 2016, Chesky was also named in the Youngest Forbes 400 list. Chesky was named one of the "World's Greatest Leaders" in 2017 by Fortune. He received an honorary doctorate from RISD that year. In 2018, Chesky was named the Bay Area Executive of the Year by American City Business Journals. In June 2022, Chesky was featured among the 100 Most Powerful People in Global Hospitality by the International Hospitality Institute.

== Philanthropy ==
In June 2016, Chesky joined Warren Buffett and Bill Gates' The Giving Pledge, a group of billionaires who have committed to giving the majority of their wealth away. Chesky donated $10 million to nonprofit organizations supporting frontline workers during the coronavirus pandemic in 2020. In 2022, Chesky was ranked No. 20 by contributions on the list of the 50 most prolific philanthropists in the United States by The Chronicle of Philanthropy. In May 2022, Chesky pledged $100 million over five years to the Obama Foundation to launch the Voyager Scholarship, for students pursuing careers in public service; the scholarship program aims to support students in their junior and senior year of college with up to $50,000 in financial aid, a $10,000 stipend, and free Airbnb housing to pursue a summer work-travel experience; a $2,000 travel credit every year for 10 years following graduation; an annual summit; and a network of mentors. On November 9, 2026 Chesky committed $100 million for the improvement of San Francisco parks, with $39 million to immediately help the city complete projects at five parks and the remaining $61 million to be allocated after the city studies how best to use the funds.
