= Bloomberg Beta =

American early stage venture capital firm

- Industry: Venture Capital
- Founded: June 2013; 13 years ago
- Founder: Bloomberg L.P.
- Headquarters: San Francisco, California, United States
- Key people: Roy Bahat; Karin Klein; James Cham; Shivon Zilis
- Total assets: $450 million
- Website: www.bloombergbeta.com

Bloomberg Beta is an early stage venture capital firm with $450 million under management, capitalized solely by Bloomberg. The fund exists to expand Bloomberg's horizons by investing in companies built by extraordinary founders that are creating profound change in the way business operates, with a focus on machine intelligence and the future of work. Bloomberg Beta was recognized by VC review site CB Insights as the #2 investor in AI.

Led by Roy Bahat, the firm has an unconventional investing model where anyone on the team can independently say "yes" to a deal. The fund's operating manual is publicly available online.

Bloomberg Beta launched in June 2013, with $75 million of funding from Bloomberg L.P. A second fund of $75 million was announced in July 2016. In October 2019, they announced a third fund of $75 million. In June 2022, they announced a fourth fund of $75 million, and their first opportunity fund, also of $75 million. Bloomberg Beta is headquartered in San Francisco, California, with additional operations in New York City.

The firm uses data to find new customers. Their "Future Founders" project started in 2014 to predict who will start companies before they do. In 2014, it began publishing an annual Machine Intelligence landscape to better understand what was happening in the start-up ecosystem with artificial intelligence and machine learning. The firm is the organizer behind "Comeback Cities", taking groups of venture capitalists and members of Congress on bus tours throughout America, to find untapped beds of talent and entrepreneurship.

== Relationship with Bloomberg L.P. ==
Bloomberg Beta is operated as a separate entity from Bloomberg L.P., which is the sole investor in the fund. It consists of three full-time partners: Roy Bahat, Karin Klein, and James Cham.
