= Midway Plaisance =

Public park in Chicago, Illinois

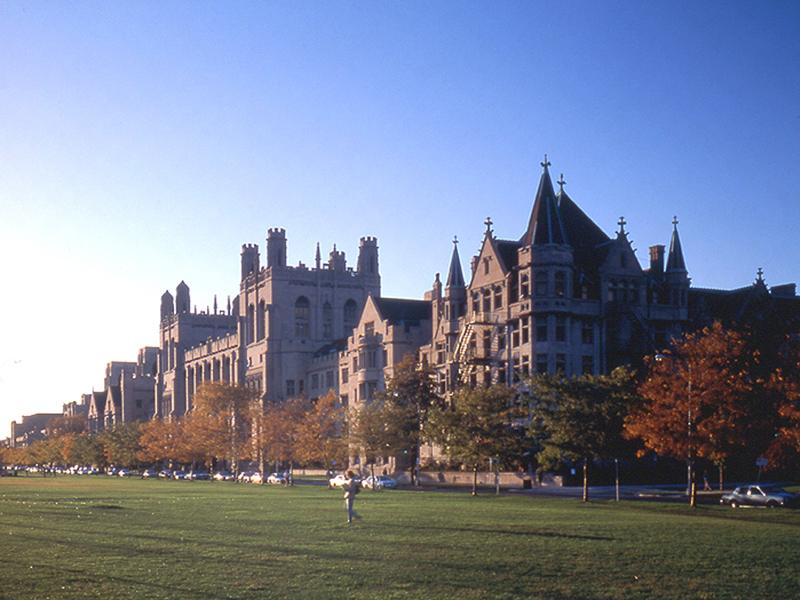
- Interactive map of Midway Plaisance
- Type: Urban park and boulevard
- Location: Chicago, Illinois, US
- Coordinates: 41°47′12.8″N 87°35′46.3″W
- Created: 1871; 155 years ago
- Operator: Chicago Park District
- Public transit: at 59th Street/University of Chicago station
- Jackson Park Historic Landscape District and Midway Plaisance
- U.S. National Register of Historic Places
- U.S. Historic district
- Architects: Frederick Law Olmsted, Lorado Taft
- NRHP reference No.: 72001565
- Added to NRHP: December 15, 1972

Midway Plaisance, known locally as the Midway, is a public park on the South Side of Chicago, Illinois. It is one mile long by 220 yards wide and extends along 59th and 60th Streets, joining Washington Park at its west end and Jackson Park at its east end. It divides the Hyde Park community area to the north from the Woodlawn community area to the south. The Midway is located near Lake Michigan, about 6 miles (10 km) south of the downtown "Loop". The University of Chicago was established just north of the park; university buildings now also front the Midway to the south.

Intended as part of the Chicago boulevard system, the park came to prominence when the Midway was laid out to host popular amusements at the World's Columbian Exposition in 1893, which hosted the world's first Ferris Wheel, later lending its name, "midway", to areas at countyand state fairs and amusement parks with sideshows. Landscaped with long vistas and avenues of trees at the start of the 20th century, the Midway in part followed the vision of its designer Frederick Law Olmsted, one of the creators of New York City's Central Park, but without his proposed feature of a Venetian canal down the Midway's center linking the lagoon systems of Jackson and Washington parks. Instead, the Midway is landscaped with a fosse, a lawn-covered depression where the canal would have been, although in the winter parts of the grounds are turned over for ice skating. The Midway Plaisance has a elements for visitors to explore, including lakes, trails, bridges, and fields. The park hosts concerts, ice-skating lessons, movie nights, and other events.

== Origin of the name ==
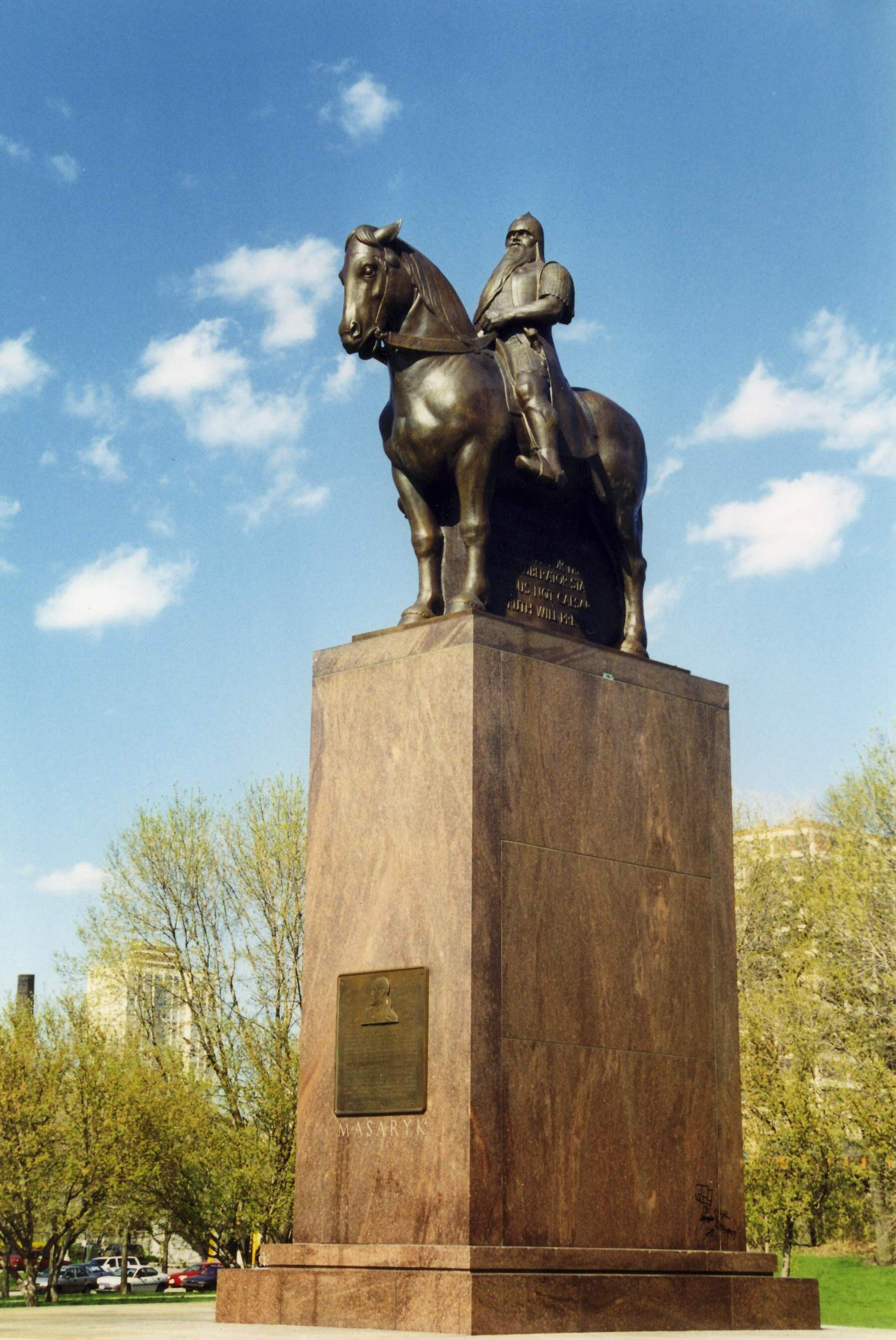
A view of the memorial on the Midway to Thomas Masaryk by sculptor Albín Polášek, represented as a legendary Knight of Blaník Mountain

The word "plaisance" is both the French spelling of and a quaint obsolete spelling for "pleasance", itself an obscure word in this context meaning "a pleasure ground laid out with shady walks, trees and shrubs, statuary, and ornamental water". In the western area, Olmsted, (the park designer) labeled a section “Upper Plaisance.” In the eastern area, he had a “Lagoon Plaisance.” Connecting the two was a “Midway Plaisance.” In other words, Midway Plaisance wasn’t a name. It was a description.

== The South Park Commission plan ==
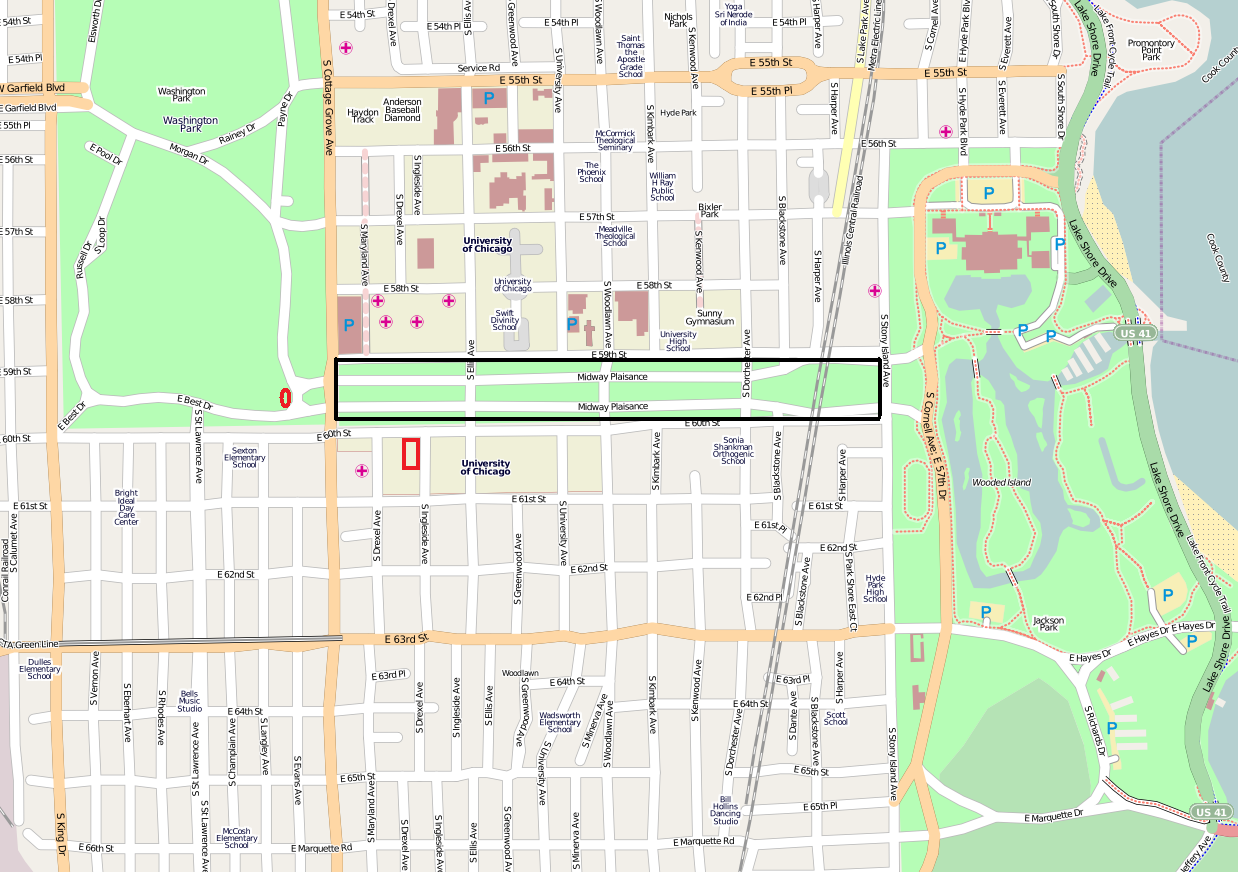
Maps showing the Midway Plaisance (black rectangle) between Washington Park to the west (left) and Jackson Park. (Chicago Park District is in green, University of Chicago in yellow background)

The Midway Plaisance began as a vision in the 1850s of Paul Cornell, a land developer, to turn an undeveloped stretch of infertile land south of Chicago into an urban lakeside retreat for middle- and upper-class residents seeking to escape city life. The area was a lakefront marsh ecosystem.

In 1869, Cornell and his South Park Commission were granted the right to set up a complex of parks and boulevards that would include Washington Park to the west, Jackson Park to the east on the lakeshore, and the Midway Plaisance as a system of paths and waterways connecting the two (see Encyclopedia of Chicago Map). The firm of Olmsted, Vaux, and Co., famous for creating New York City's Central Park, was hired to design the urban oasis. Part of their plan was that the Midway would function as "a magnificent chain of lakes", allowing boaters to travel from the ponds in Washington Park through the lagoons in Jackson Park and into Lake Michigan.

The South Park Commission office, where all the detailed plans were stored, was burned in the Great Chicago Fire of 1871. The expense of rebuilding the city eliminated the funds to cover expenditures that the plans would have entailed, and the South Park area remained largely in its natural swampy state.

== World's Columbian Exposition ==
The World's Columbian Exposition of 1893 was held in the underdeveloped parts of the South Park. The worldwide celebration of Columbus' transfer of "the torch of civilization to the New World" in 1492 was one of the most successful and influential of world's fairs. It covered over 600 acres (2.4 km^{2}) and attracted exhibitors and visitors from all over the world.

For the Exposition, the mile-long Midway Plaisance, running from the eastern edge of Washington Park on Cottage Grove Avenue to the western edge of Jackson Park on Stony Island Avenue, was turned over to the theatrical entrepreneur Sol Bloom, a protégé of Chicago mayor Carter Harrison III. It became a grand mix of fakes, hokum, and the genuinely educational and introduced the "hootchy-cootchy" version of the belly dance in the "Street in Cairo" amusement; it was the most popular, with 2.25 million admissions. George Washington Gale Ferris Jr.'s original Ferris Wheel carried over 1.5 million passengers. The Midway's money-making concessions and sideshows made over $4 million in 1893 dollars, and it was the more memorable portion of the Exposition for many visitors. The Midway also featured more scholarly exhibits which were overseen by Frederic Ward Putnam, head of Harvard University’s Peabody Museum of Archaeology and Ethnology, and ethnologist Otis Tufton Mason of the Smithsonian Institution.

In the years after the Exposition closed, "midway" came to be used in the United States to signify the area for amusements at a county or state fair, circus, or amusement park.

The Midway Plaisance led visitors from the Midway Plaisance to the Women's Building and then to the White City.

The park is one of the main settings in The Devil in the White City, the 2003 book by Erik Larson.

== University of Chicago ==
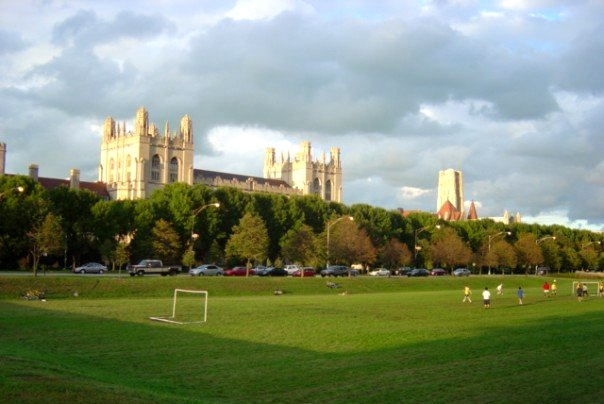
Spires of English Gothic buildings of The University of Chicago campus overlooking the tree-lined, grassy Midway Plaisance; view looking northeast.

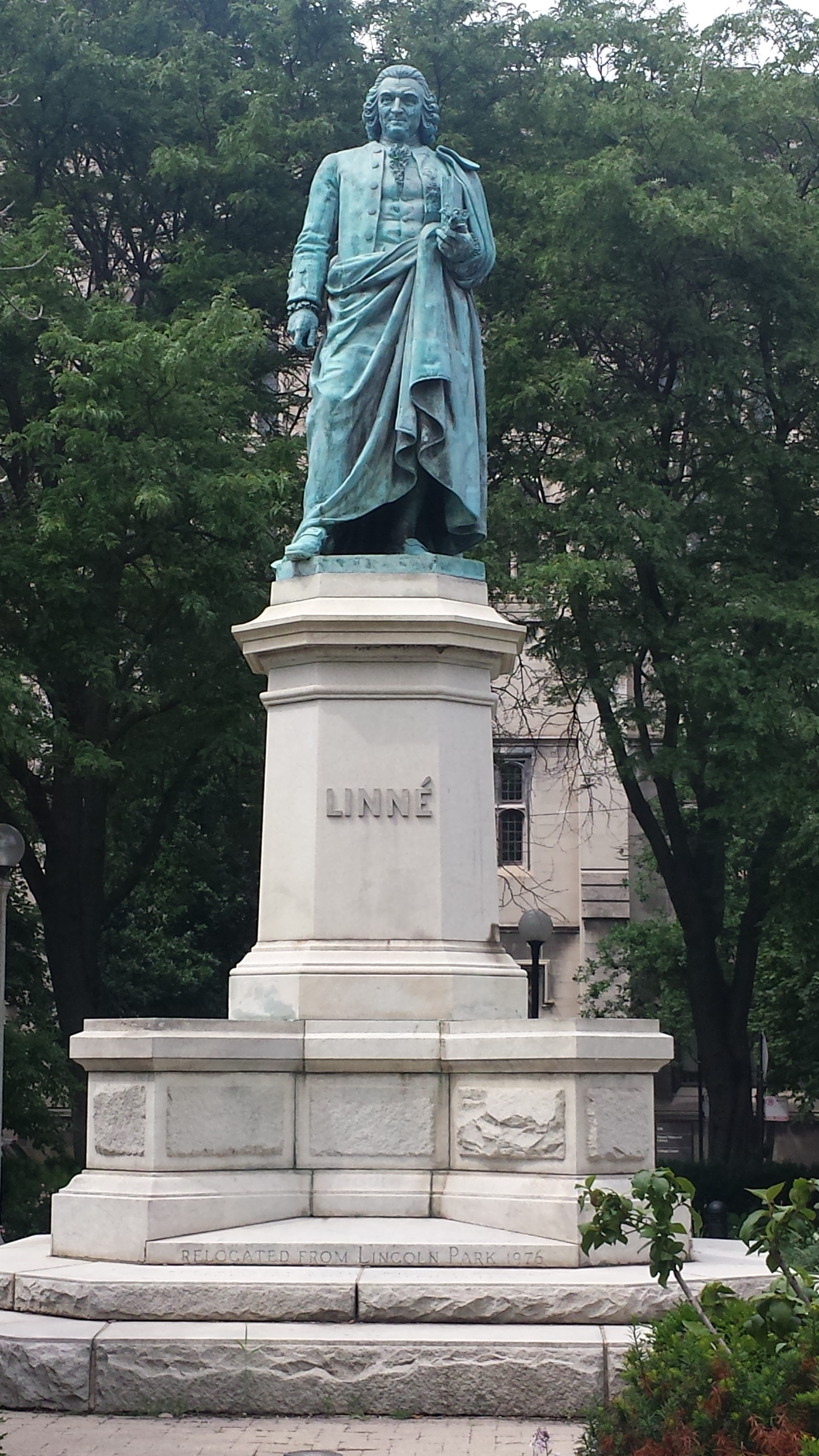
Linnaeus statue near the University of Chicago campus on the Midway

After the Exposition, the Midway Plaisance was returned to a park setting, under the renewed plans of Frederick Law Olmsted.

In 1926, the University of Chicago acquired land to the south of the Midway, which today sits between the original main campus to the north and the professional graduate schools the University of Chicago Law School, the Harris School of Public Policy, the Crown Family School of Social Work, Policy, and Practice, and the Graham School of Continuing Liberal and Professional Studies, as well as the University of Chicago Press.

Later designers and artists, including Lorado Taft, and Eero Saarinen added or sought to add their vision to the Midway, which hosts a statue of the father of modern taxonomy, Carl Linnaeus, and an equestrian statue by sculptor Albin Polasek of the Knight of Blanik, a legendary Czech savior who emerges from Blaník mountain in his nation's hour of need.

It has remained essentially a green area, a public resource subject to much speculation, and various plans of redevelopment. The sunken panels, home now to soccer players and ice skating and sports facility, the cross-street "bridges", and the east–west lines of trees, pay homage to Olmsted's vision.

In 1999, a new master plan for the Midway Plaisance done by OLIN, a landscape architecture firm, was unveiled by the University of Chicago and the Chicago Park District.

The proximity of the Midway to the university gave the school's early football teams, the Maroons, a second nickname, "Monsters of the Midway", a name later applied to the Chicago Bears when the University of Chicago dropped its football program. The program has since been reinstated, and the Maroons play at Stagg Field on 55th street, half a mile north of the midway.
