= Michael Strautmanis =

American politician (born 1969)

Mike Strautmanis
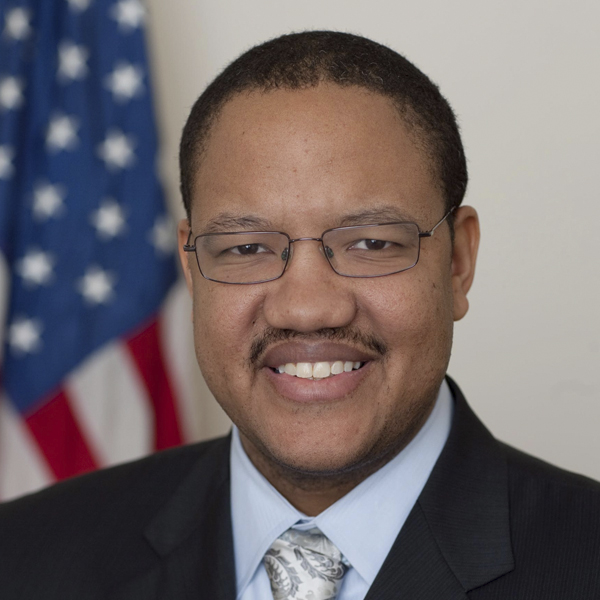
- Born: Michael Alexander Young; March 24, 1969 (age 57); Chicago, Illinois, U.S.
- Education: University of Illinois, Urbana-Champaign (BS); University of Illinois College of Law (JD)
- Occupations: Lawyer, political organizer
- Known for: Political appointee during the Presidency of Barack Obama
- Political party: Democratic

Michael Alexander Strautmanis (born Michael Alexander Young, March 24, 1969) is an American lawyer and political organizer who served as chief of staff to Valerie Jarrett in the White House Office of Public Engagement during the Presidency of Barack Obama. He currently works as Executive Vice President for Public Engagement at the Obama Foundation.

== Early life and education ==
Michael Alexander Strautmanis was born in Chicago and lived briefly on the South Side with his mother. When his mother married a Latvian immigrant, Juris Strautmanis, they moved to the Uptown neighborhood located in Chicago's North Side. He would later take the last-name of his step-father due to a fractured relationship with his biological father. He attended a prestigious local prep school, the Jesuit-run St. Ignatius College Prep, on a financial-aid program. His mother was a teacher at Jenner Elementary School, while his step-father was a guidance counselor.

He graduated from the University of Illinois Urbana-Champaign in 1991 with a degree in advertising, although he initially started as a theater major. His interest in law arose from a summer job he had in college as a bicycle messenger, where he was inspired by the law firm buildings that he delivered packages to; one of these buildings was Sidley Austin law firm. The year before law school, he called the head of human resources of Sidley 13 times and was eventually given a job as a paralegal. As a paralegal, he worked under Michelle Obama from 1991 to 1992.

At Sidley, Strautmanis became close friends with Michelle Obama, whom he credits as influential to his interest in practicing law. He later attended the University of Illinois College of Law where he would spend late-night study sessions with then-Representative Jesse Jackson Jr. at IHOP. He earned his J.D. in 1994. He practiced complex litigation, labor and employment law, and intellectual property matters in Chicago at Michael Best & Friedrich.

== Early political career ==
As a young lawyer with an interest in politics, Strautmanis met Thomas Hynes, an influential politician in Chicago, at a Christmas party, which lead to Strautmanis helping Hyne's son with Bill Clinton and Al Gore's Illinois statewide campaign. Wanting to go to Washington, Strautmanis gave his resume to then U.S. Assistant Attorney General Deval Patrick after Patrick gave a speech in Chicago; soon after, he was given a position in Washington to serve in the Clinton Administration as the Special Assistant to the General Counsel at the United States Agency for International Development (USAID), staying in the position from 1998 to 1999.

Strautmanis later secured a position as legislative director and counsel for then U.S. Congressman Rod Blagojevich and aided in him winning the 2002 Illinois gubernatorial campaign. During this period, Strautmanis had temporarily left this position to volunteer for Barack Obama's U.S. House of Representatives 2000 campaign, although he would return once Obama lost. In 2002, Strautmanis left to work for the American Association for Justice as a lobbyist for trial lawyers, a position he kept till 2005.

== Obama Administration ==
He served as Chief Counsel and the Director of Public Liaison and Intergovernmental Affairs on Obama's presidential transition team. In December 2008, Obama announced in a press release that Strautmanis would serve as Chief of Staff to the Assistant to the President for Intergovernmental Relations and Public Engagement for Valerie Jarrett.

== Post-political career ==
In March 2013, he announced his resignation from the White House staff in order to accept a post with the Walt Disney Company specializing in corporate citizenship. In November 2015, the Obama Foundation announced Strautmanis would become the Vice President of Civic Engagement.

Strautmanis is on the board of directors for Lyric Opera of Chicago and Next Street.

== Works ==
In 2018, Strautmanis detailed his longstanding relationship with Michelle and Barack Obama and his experiences in the Obama White House in a chapter in West Wingers: Stories from the Dream Chasers, Change Makers, and Hope Creators Inside the Obama White House.
