= Roy Bahat =

American venture capitalist

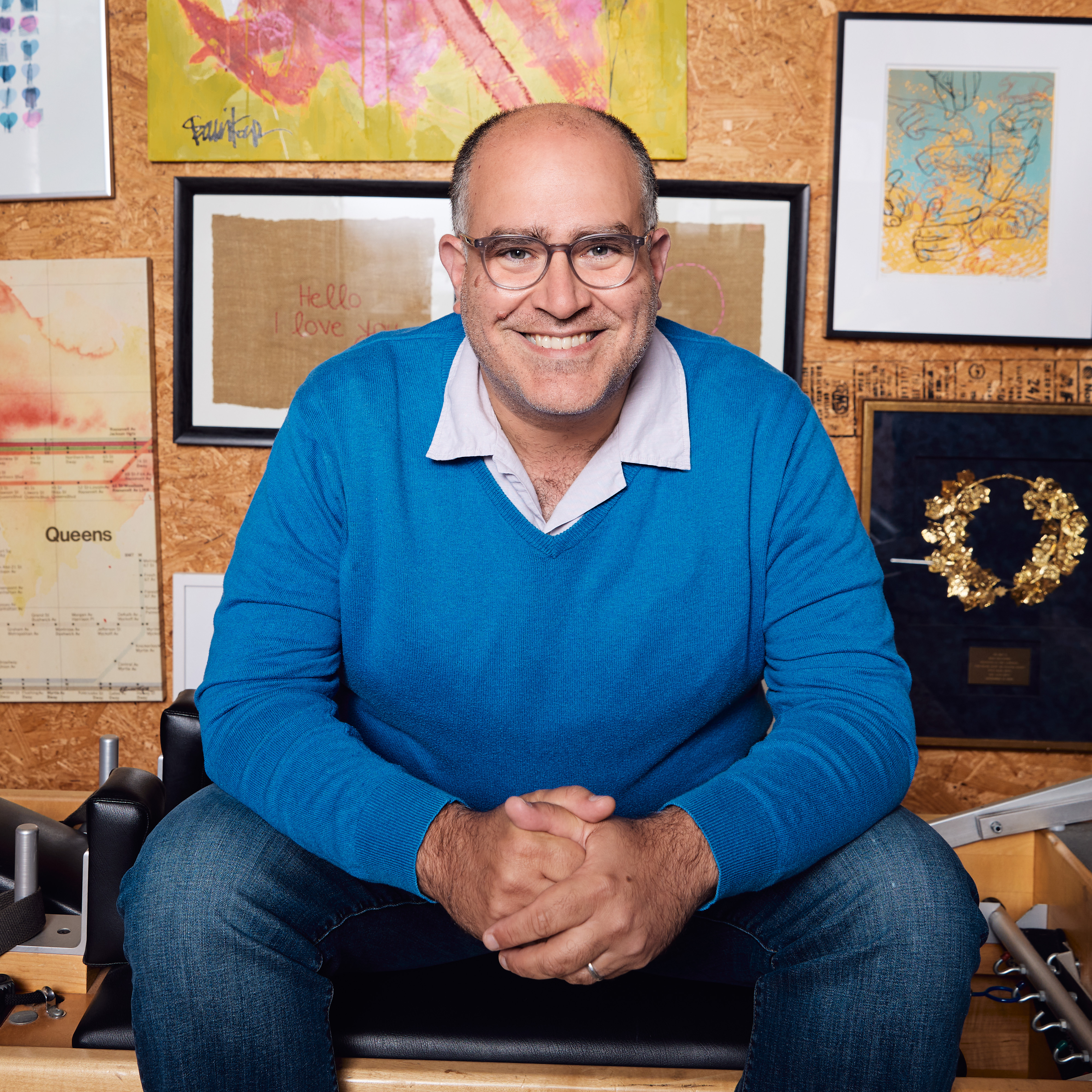
- Born: circa. 1977
- Education: Harvard University (AB); University of Oxford
- Occupations: Venture capitalist and activist
- Employer: Bloomberg Beta
- Title: Head of Bloomberg Beta
- Website: Personal website

Roy Bahat (born 1977) is a venture capitalist, educator, and activist. He is currently the head of Bloomberg Beta, the venture capital arm of Bloomberg. He teaches at UC Berkeley's Haas School of Business.

== Early life and education ==
Bahat was born in 1977. His mother worked for the American Jewish Committee and his father was an architect. He graduated from Harvard University magna cum laude with a degree in social studies and was a Rhodes Scholar at the University of Oxford. At Oxford, Bahat earned a master's degree in economics.

== Career ==
In 2002 Bahat worked for then-New York City Mayor Michael Bloomberg as the Senior Policy Director. He left to work for a non-profit called NYC2012, which advocated for the 2012 Summer Olympics to be held in New York City. In 2007, Bahat started at News Corporation. He later led the News Corp. brand IGN Entertainment. Bahat left News Corp. in August 2012. He also cofounded a gaming console company called OUYA and created a non-profit.

Bahat has been a venture capitalist since about 2012. He was known in part for funding smaller startups where the founders still had day jobs. In September 2020, Bahat moved temporarily to Milwaukee, Wisconsin in an effort to influence politics in a swing state. He raised money for the Democratic party. He was also involved with "Walk the Vote," a non-partisan group that organizes marches to voting booths. Bahat was on the board of a New York City Jewish day school called the Abraham Joshua Heschel School.

Bahat and his partners invested in artificial intelligence company Newsle in 2014. Roy Bahat advised the first Starbucks union organizers.

In 2013, Bloomberg Beta was created and Bahat was appointed head of the new entity. Bahat is a partner of Bloomberg Beta along with Karin Klein and James Cham. Bahat started teaching an MBA course on leading a unionized workforce at University of California, Berkeley. He also was a member of the Future of Work Commission, a governmental organization focused on economic growth in California.

== Personal life ==
Bahat and his wife Sara Fenske married in 2007. The couple share two children. He and his wife are both active supporters of the Democratic Party.
