= Obama Foundation =

Chicago-based nonprofit organization founded in 2014

The Barack Obama Foundation
- Formation: 2014; 12 years ago
- Founders: Barack Obama; Michelle Obama
- Type: Non-operating private foundation
- Tax ID no.: EIN 46-4950751
- Legal status: 501(c)(3) organization
- Headquarters: Hyde Park, Chicago, Illinois
- CEO: Valerie Jarrett
- Revenue: $143,158,266 (2019)
- Endowment: $429,545,259 (2019)
- Website: www.obama.org

The Barack Obama Foundation is a Chicago-based nonprofit organization founded in 2014. It oversees the Barack Obama Presidential Center, runs the My Brother's Keeper Alliance (a program Barack Obama began while he was president), and the Girls Opportunity Alliance begun by Michelle Obama. It also operates a leadership program and a scholarship program through the University of Chicago's Harris School of Public Policy.

== History ==
The foundation held its inaugural summit on October 31, 2017, in Chicago. According to Barack Obama, he intends for his foundation to be central to many of his post-presidential activities, which he sees as having the potential to be more consequential than his time in the White House.

The foundation's first president was Adewale Adeyemo, an economist and former Deputy National Security Adviser for International Economic Affairs who joined in August 2019. In 2020, President-elect Joe Biden selected Adeyemo to serve as Deputy Secretary of the Treasury, and he was replaced by Valerie Jarrett. Jarrett has been CEO of the Foundation since 2021.

The Foundation raised $232.6 million in 2017 and $164.8 million in 2018. In 2022, all contributions and in-kind gifts totaled $311 million. It has net assets of $925 million and has raised $1.1 billion since 2017.

== Barack Obama Presidential Center ==
The foundation's major project as of March 2018 is to oversee the creation of the planned presidential library of former president Obama. In May 2015, the foundation, along with Chicago mayor Rahm Emanuel, announced the development of the center and its location in the Jackson Park neighborhood of Chicago's South Side. The planning process met with criticism from some local leaders who questioned the benefit for the surrounding area and did not feel the community was sufficiently involved. On February 26, 2019, Chicago residents voted to require a community benefits agreement in order to make the Center official, something to which the Obama Foundation has objected.

Updated plans were released in 2019, with some changes based on feedback. The complex includes four buildings, with a museum, public space, public library branch, and athletic center. It was designed by the architectural firm Tod Williams Billie Tsien.

Construction on the 19.3-acre campus is expected to top out in April 2024, and be completed in October 2025.

Some of the Obama Foundation's programs will be headquartered at the new Presidential Center.

== Scholarships and programs ==
In February 2018, the foundation announced it had begun a scholarship program at the University of Chicago. The scholarships are awarded to 25 American and international master's students in the Harris School of Public Policy in an effort to cultivate leadership through the Presidential Center. It covers the students' tuition and living expenses while they work with the foundation and take classes. It also began sponsoring fellowships called Obama Foundation Scholars at Columbia University, Obama's alma mater. In its first year, 2018, the non-degree-granting program paid the expenses and provided a stipend for 12 international students.

=== Voyager Scholarship ===
In May 2022, The Obama Foundation announced a $100 million gift from Airbnb co-founder and CEO Brian Chesky. The gift was to launch a new scholarship program for students pursuing careers in public services. The Voyager Scholarship, also known as the "Obama-Chesky Scholarship for Public Service" aimed to support students in their junior and senior years of college with up to $50,000 in financial aid, a $10,000 stipend and free Airbnb housing to pursue a summer work-travel experience between their junior and senior years of college; a $2,000 travel credit every year for 10 years following graduation; an annual summit; and a network of mentors. On September 12, 2022, the inaugural cohort of 100 "Voyagers" was announced. The inaugural cohort represented 36 US states and territories and 70 US colleges and universities. Barack Obama and Brian Chesky surprised the 2022 cohort via a Zoom video call to share insights into their public service journeys and to congratulate the students on their selection.

=== My Brother's Keeper Alliance ===
The My Brother's Keeper Alliance (MBK Alliance) is a program inspired by President Obama's My Brother's Keeper Challenge that he started through the White House in 2014. Its purpose is to address challenges and opportunity gaps that boys and young men of color face, providing support through mentoring, education, job training, and other activities. In 2017, MBK Alliance was moved into the Obama Foundation. MBK Alliance operates the Model Communities initiative, which recognizes and provides funding and coaching for communities implementing evidence-based practices to meet six milestones: reduction of violence, increasing readiness to learn, reading at grade level by third grade, graduating high school, graduating college or vocational school, and finding employment. MBK Alliance has recognized four Model Communities as of May 2024: Newark, New Jersey; Omaha, Nebraska; Tulsa, Oklahoma; and Yonkers, New York.

=== Girls Opportunity Alliance ===
In 2018, Michelle Obama created the Girls Opportunity Alliance, a program within the Obama Foundation focused on adolescent girls' education.
