= Roti (restaurant chain) =

Mediterranean restaurant chain

- Logo from website in 2025

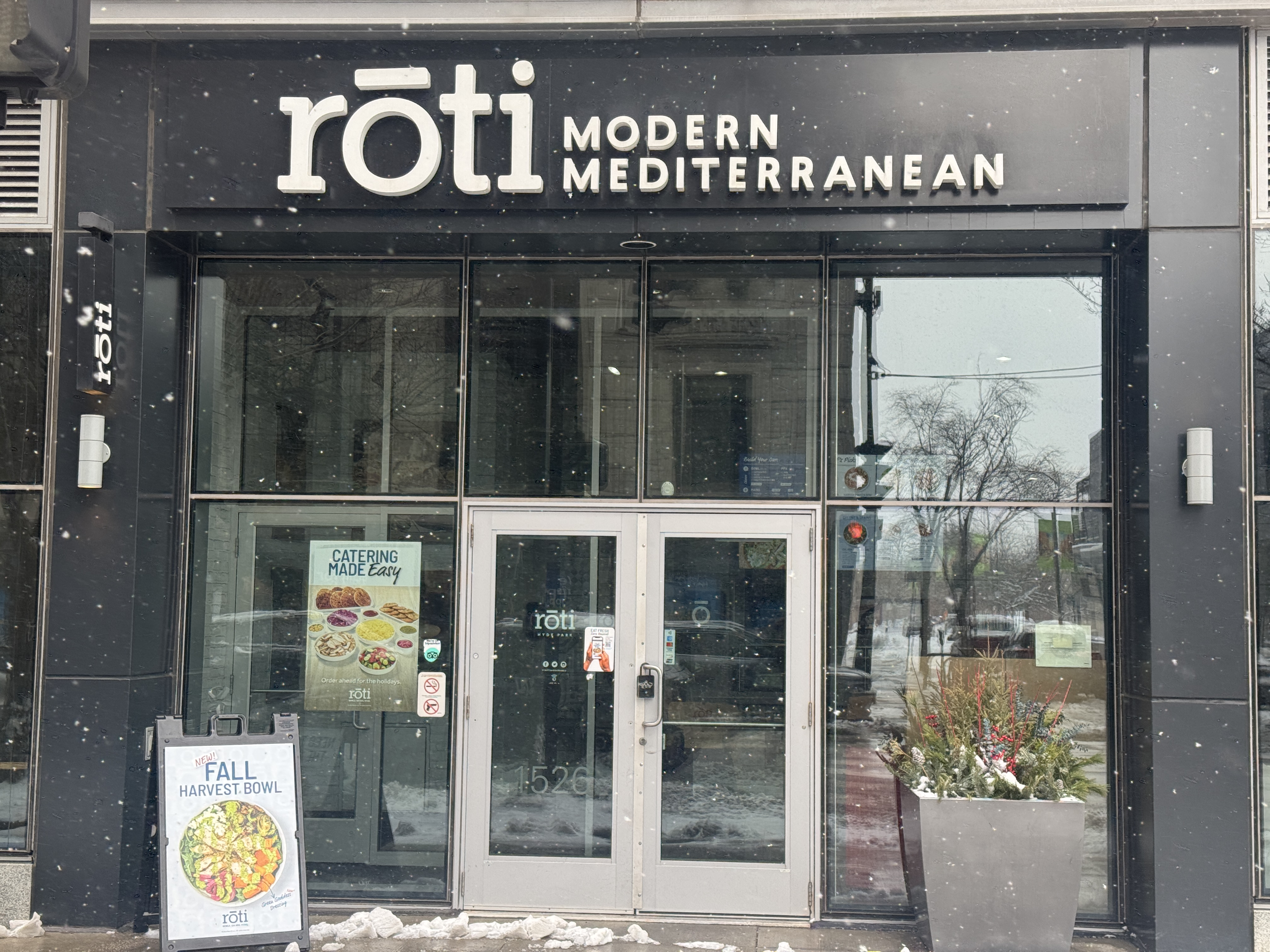
- Roti entrance at Harper Court on 53rd Street in Hyde Park, Chicago
- Type: Private company
- Industry: Restaurants
- Genre: Fast Casual
- Founded: 2007; 19 years ago Chicago, Illinois, U.S.
- Headquarters: 600 West Fulton Street; Suite 101; Chicago, Illinois, 6066, United States
- Number of locations: 17 stores + 1 stadium (2025)
- Area served: United States
- Number of employees: 200
- Website: roti.com

Roti (stylized as rōti) and formerly known as Roti Restaurants, Inc., Rōti Modern Mediterranean and Rōti Mediterranean Grill, is an American fast casual restaurant serving Mediterranean cuisine. The firm was founded in 2007, and at its peak prior to the COVID-19 pandemic it had 42 locations in Chicago, Minneapolis, Dallas, Houston, New York City, and Washington, D.C. It filed for bankruptcy in 2024 and was acquired by Edible Arrangements in 2025. Under Edible, it continued with 17 corporate-owned locations in Chicago, Minneapolis and Washington, D.C., and announced partnership plans, including a deal with Mercedes-Benz Stadium.

== History ==
The restaurant was founded in Chicago in 2007 to fill a void of healthy Mediterranean food options. In 2010, it expanded to the Washington, D.C., market. In 2011, it doubled from 6 to 12 locations. In 2013, it launched in New York City with its 16th location (including 9 in the D.C. area and 6 in Chicago) under the leadership of co-founder and CEO Bill Post and chairman Mats Lederhausen, who had been instrumental in the initial public offering of Chipotle Mexican Grill. In Roti's early years, healthy fast casual restaurants were the fastest growing sector of the restaurant industry, with both Chipotle and Panera Bread Company having over 1500 locations by early 2014. Its upstart mediterranean cuisine competitors at the time were GRK Greek Kitchen, Naf Naf Grill, and Zoës Kitchen. In March 2014, the 19-store (DC market (9), Chicago (8) and New York City (2)) franchise announced Carl Segal as its CEO. It was also planning three more DC locations.

At the time of the September 2015 rebranding name change from Roti Mediterranean Grill with Roti Modern Mediterranean, they expanded the beverage menu to a lineup of beer, wine, house-made juices, and tea to complement the entrees of wrap or pita sandwiches, rice plates, and salads. On February 29, 2016, it announced that all of their 21 locations would serve purely grass-fed beef. Other healthy/high-quality elements of the Roti cuisine include antibiotics-free chicken, organic chickpeas, and sustainably-raised Atlantic salmon. That December, Roti was sued for violating the Fair and Accurate Credit Transactions Act by printing too many credit card number digits on its receipts. In June 2017, it launched its first Texas location (in Uptown, Dallas). In July 2017, it debuted in Minnesota, and it followed with three further Minnesota locations in 2018. In March 2018, it accepted a $23 million investment from Valor Equity Partners to undertake a national expansion of its 34-store franchise. In November 2019, it launched in Houston.

In February 2020, Justin Seamonds was named CEO of the 42-location franchise. Its 42 locations included Chicago, Washington, D.C., Dallas, Houston, Minneapolis and New York City. The pandemic wiped out the downtown midday rush business and brought increased suburban, online and third-party delivery sales. In late 2020, it revamped its menu and business strategy from completely made to order to a combination of customized and curated one-click meal options in response to the pandemic's economic impact. In April 2021, it permanently closed 14 of its 42 prepandemic locations, while another 14 remained temporarily closed. In the Chicago area, seven of them quickly reopened and an extra five were scheduled to reopen, while six of them were permanently closed. Over half of its locations had been in the metropolitan business districts, where pandemic related business changes had resulted in less foot traffic. By early 2023, it had 26 locations, but 7 more closed by summer 2024. By that time pandemic-related rent deferral arrangements had expired and the cost environment became difficult to navigate.

In August 2024, Roti filed for Chapter 11 bankruptcy, due to pressure from the "consumer-spending downturn", increased expenses, and other business issues. In October 2024, Roti announced that 19 store locations, its intellectual property, equipment, operational and other assets were being made available in a November bankruptcy auction without any liabilities. The bid deadline was November 7 and minimum bid was $3.5 million for the 19 restaurants that had $25.7 million in sales in 2023. The leading bidder of the auction was unable to close the sale resulting in an open auction in which many bidders only sought the leases, but not the brand. BroadPeak Capital secured 17 of the leases (in 10 in Chicago, 3 in Minneapolis and 4 in the Washington DC area) and the intellectual property in three separate transactions, making the company's first acquisition for nearly $4.7 million in February 2025. Upon acquisition, Roti joined the Edible Brands platform. In August 2025, the company announced that to augment the corporate-owned store model, they would be accepting franchising applications with investments ranging from $494,300 to $813,700 as well as a partnership with Mercedes-Benz Stadium. At the time, the plan was to re-enter the Texas market as well as expand into Florida, Georgia, Michigan, North Carolina, Ohio, and South Carolina.
