= Harper Court =

Commercial development space in Chicago, USA

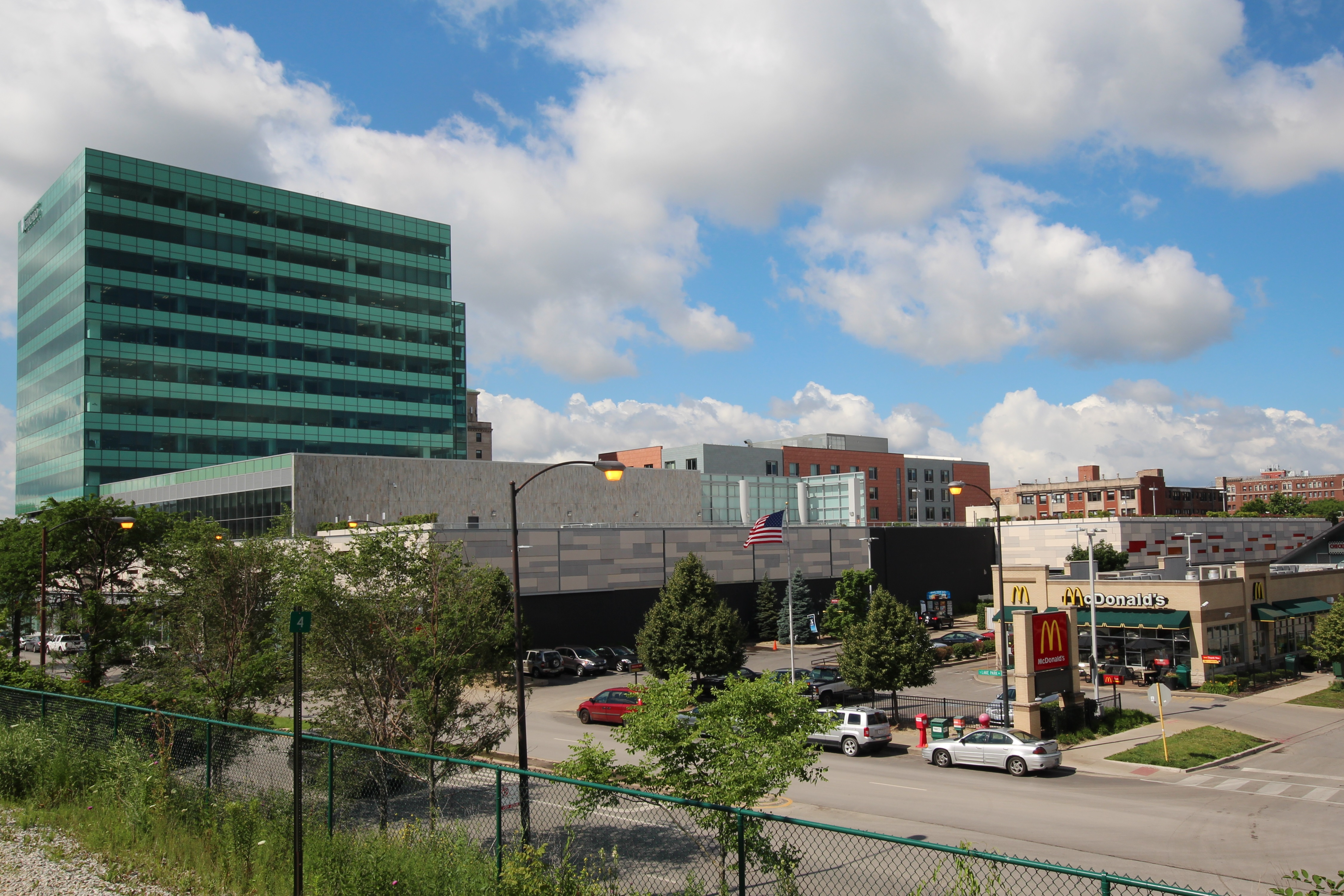
- Harper Court from the Hyde Park/53rd Street station of the Metra Electric District line in 2014

Project
- Size: 3.18-acre (1.3 ha)
- Developer: Vermilion Development; JFJ Development
- Owner: CLAL Insurance Company; University of Chicago
- Website: Official website

Physical features
- Major buildings: 2

Location
- Location within Chicago metropolitan area Location within Illinois
- Coordinates: 41°48′00″N 87°35′18″W
- Country: United States
- State: Illinois
- City: Chicago
- Neighborhood: Hyde Park
- Location: 5235 S Harper Ct, Chicago, IL 60615

Harper Court is a mixed-use commercial development in the Hyde Park community area on the South Side of Chicago, Illinois. It contains a Hyatt Hotel and a 12-story office tower that is leased and occupied by the University of Chicago. Although the hotel opened on September 17, 2013, the commercial structure, which also has extensive retail and parking space, officially opened on November 8, 2013. The University of Chicago exercised its option to purchase most of the development on November 13 and then put most of what it acquired up for sale in March 2014. The University provided much of the financing and retains a master lease over the retail tenants. The development was acquired by CLAL Insurance Company in July 2014.

== Details ==
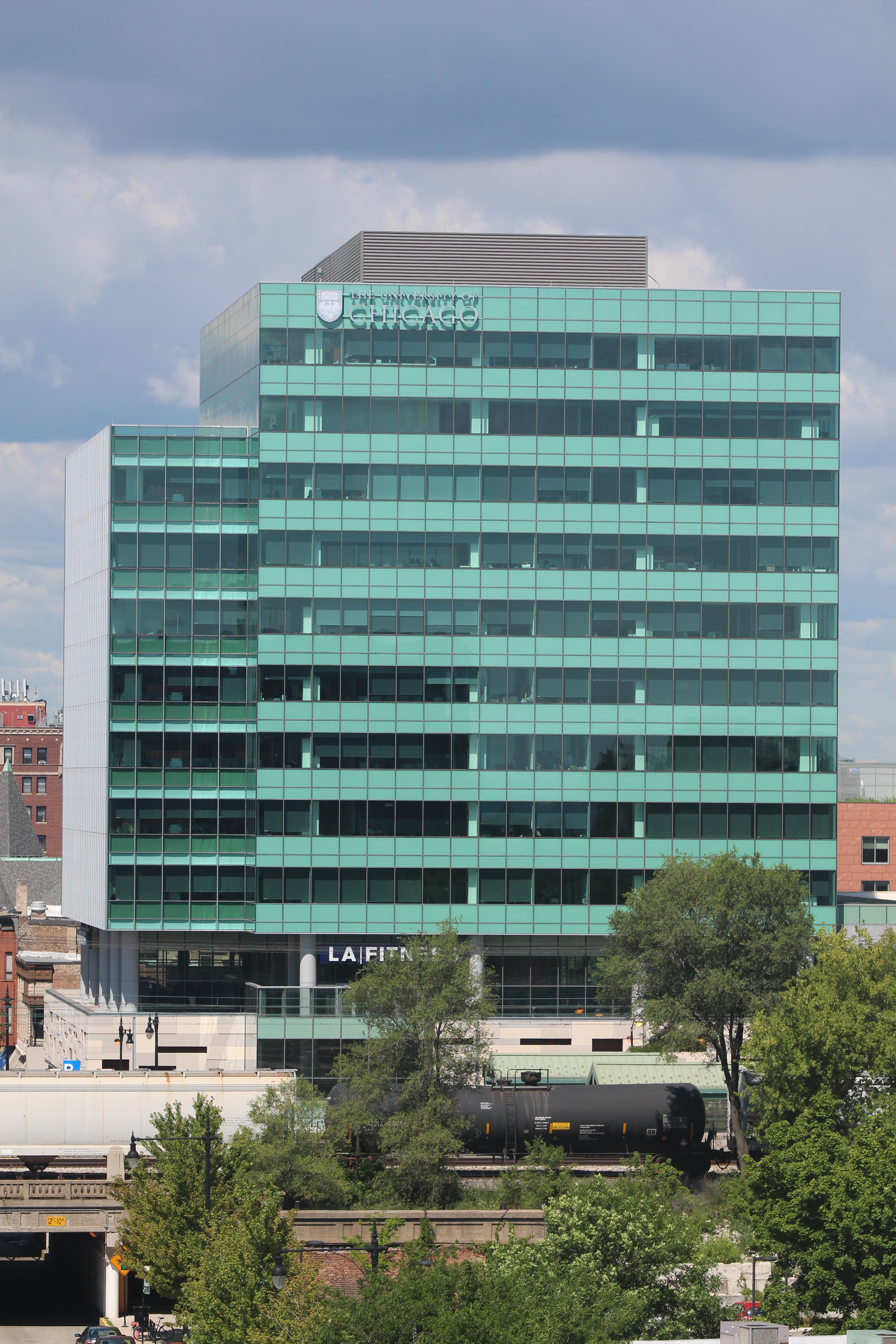
Harper Court from the Hampton House

Harper Court is located about 6 miles (9.7 km) southeast of downtown Chicago and is bordered on the south by 53rd Street, which is the main commercial corridor of Hyde Park, and to the east by the Metra Electric District line. Developers for the project were Vermilion Development and JFJ Development, while equity was provided by Canyon-Johnson Urban Funds (a joint venture investment arm for Canyon Capital Realty Advisors and Earvin "Magic" Johnson). At the time of its development, the University of Chicago was also involved in developing several surrounding properties on the 53rd street corridor. As a result of the collaboration between the city and the University several new businesses had opened up around the Harper Court site, including Clarke's (a 24-hour diner), Harper Theater (a movie theater), Akira (clothing store) and Five Guys. The street that bisects the development was changed from two-way to one-way on May 16, 2014.

In 2001, the city designated an 84-acre (34.0 ha) area on and around 53rd street as a tax increment financing (TIF) district due to the general underdevelopment and disrepair of properties on the corridor, making the properties eligible for tax incentives. Harper Court sits on a 3.18-acre (1.3 ha) site that the University purchased in 2008. The structure, which has a 131-room Hyatt Place brand Hyatt hotel and a 12-story office tower, includes 150,000 square feet (13,935 m^{2}) of office space, 75,000 square feet (6,968 m^{2}) of retail space and a parking structure with over 500 parking spaces. The building was partially financed by $20 million in TIF funding subsidy as well as land writedowns that bring the total financing assistance to $23.5 million. The TIF funds will not be allocated by the city until Harper Court has been declared completed. The Hyatt hotel received a separate $5.2 million subsidy from the Chicago City Council.

== Hyatt Place ==
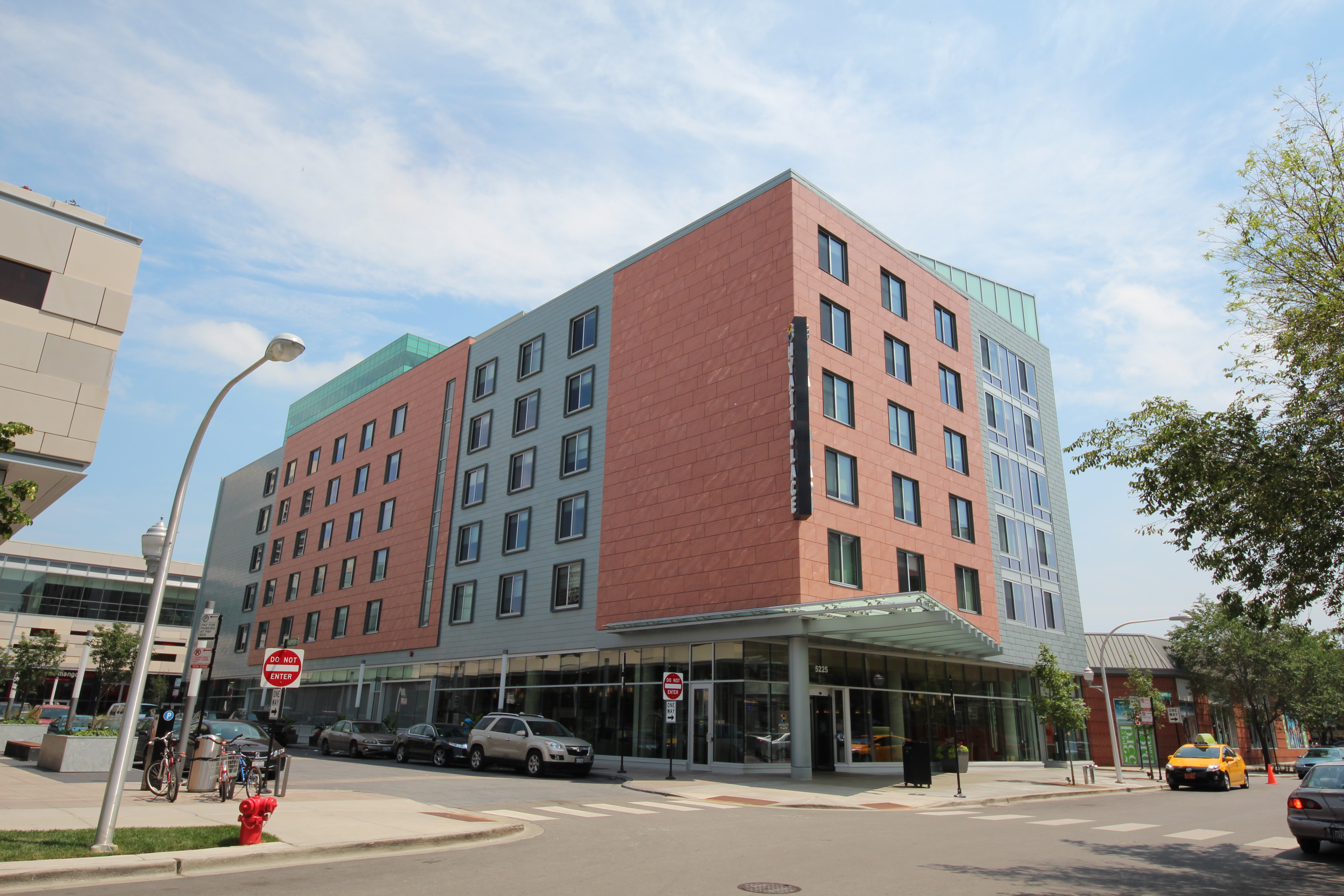
Hyatt Place Chicago–South/University Medical Center (July 6, 2014)

The Hyatt Place hotel portion, which is officially named Hyatt Place Chicago–South/University Medical Centre and has its own underground parking structure, opened on September 17, 2013. The hotel was the first built in Hyde Park in 50 years. Smart Hotels owns the Hyatt portion of the development, which is not for sale.

== University of Chicago involvement ==
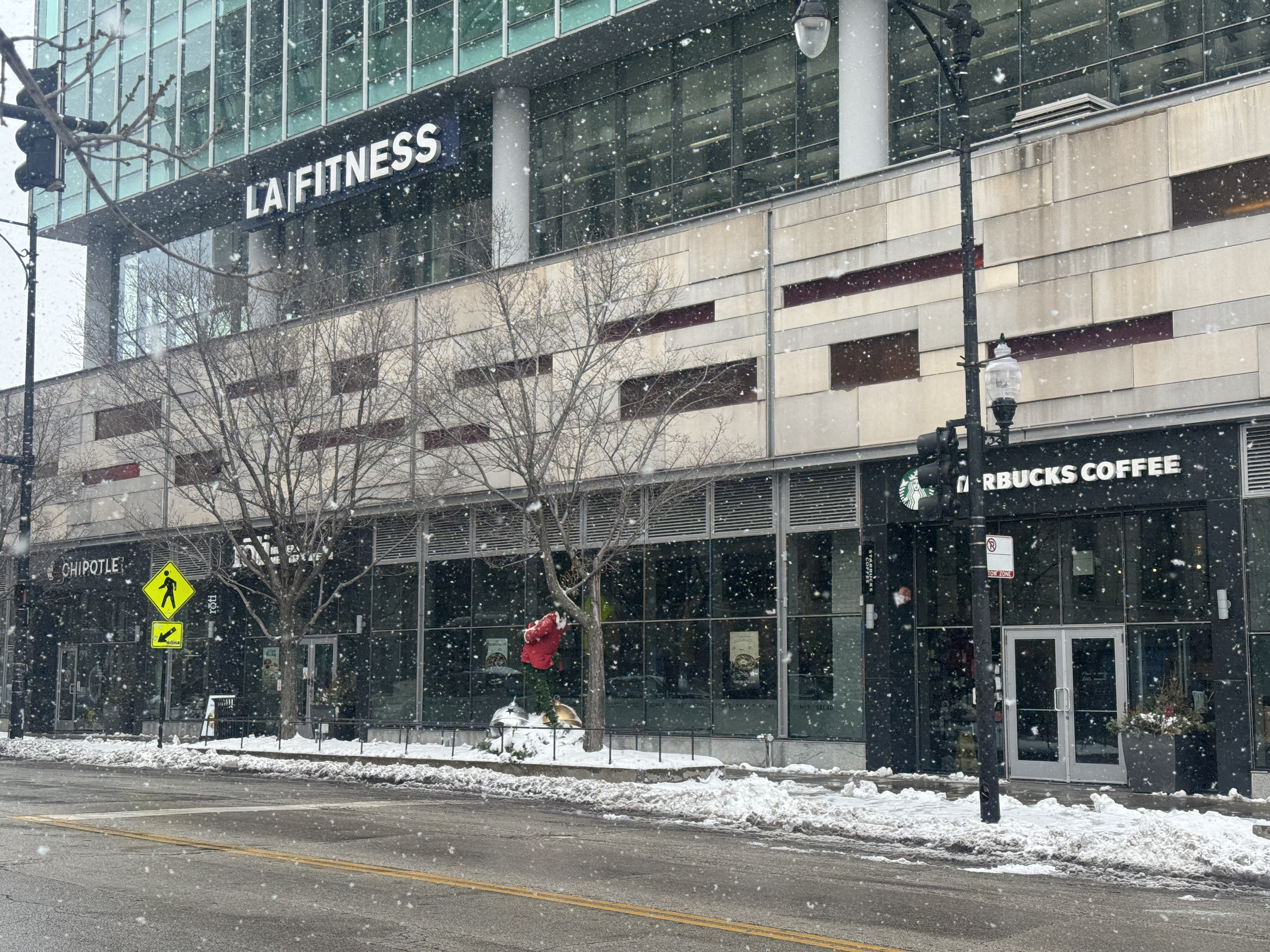
street level (left to right) Chipotle Mexican Grill, Roti (restaurant chain) and Starbucks and LA Fitness on the second floor.

The University of Chicago invested $30 million in the land acquisition and office space buildout in addition to providing a $21.5 million loan guarantee for construction of the new Hyatt Place hotel. The structure officially opened on November 8, 2013 and the University of Chicago exercised its option to purchase the office, parking and retail components as well as the rights to develop 425 residential units in the future for $98 million five days later. The University, which put the property up for sale in March 2014, leases all of the office space to host 550 employees. The University employees that started moving into Harper Court on November 7, 2013 were from the Information Technology Services (ITS), Alumni Relations and Development, and Facilities Services departments. The University's 20-year master lease includes the retail space. The University is not selling the residential development rights. On July 25, the city of Chicago approved the sale of the current structure (and not the phase 2 residential construction) to CLAL Insurance Company for $112 million.
