= Mayfair Apartments (Chicago) =

- U.S. National Register of Historic Places
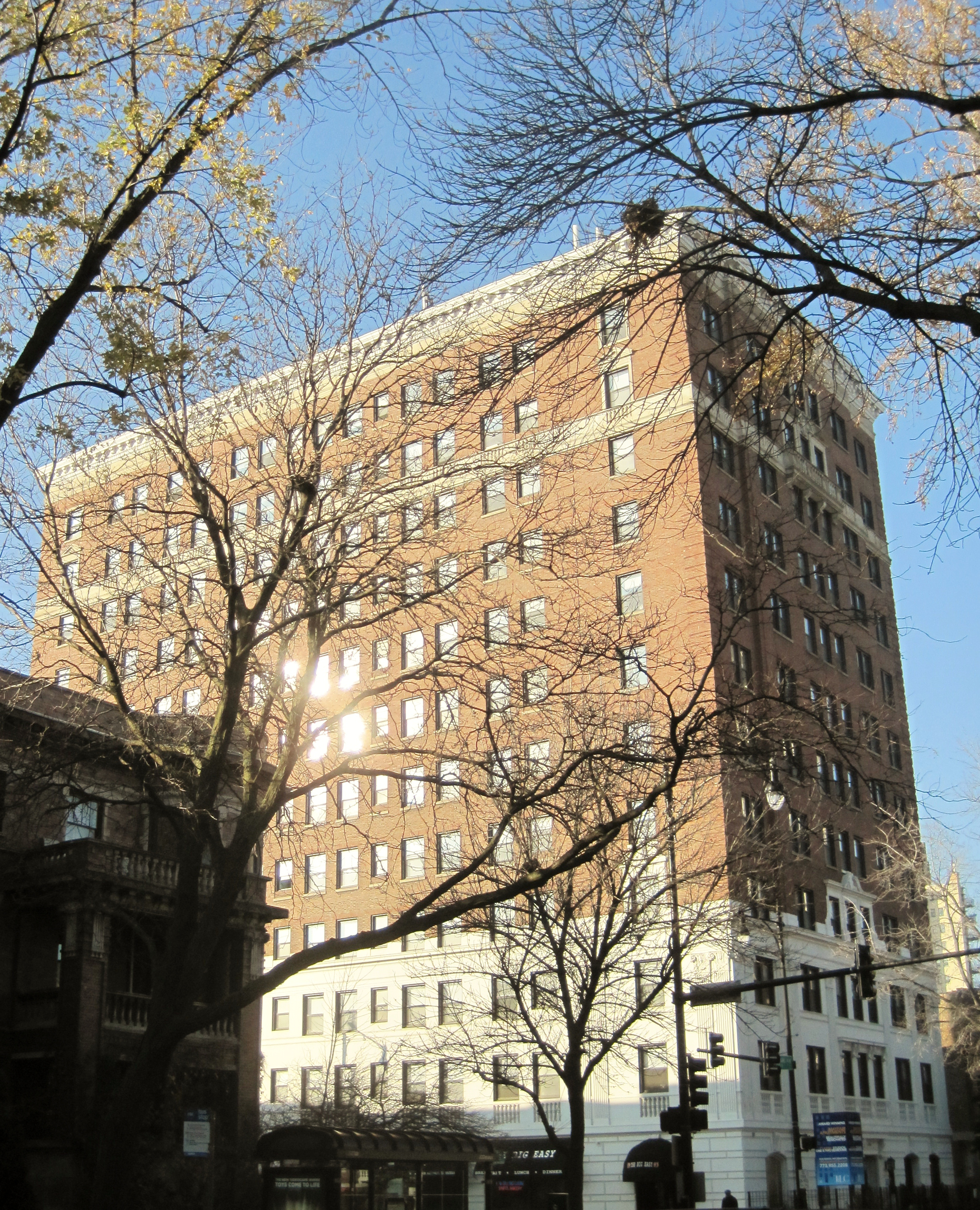

- Location within Chicago metropolitan area Location within Illinois Location within the United States
- Location: 1650-1666 E. 56th St., Chicago, Illinois
- Coordinates: 41°47′43″N 87°35′03″W
- Area: 0.2 acres (0.081 ha)
- Built: 1926
- Built by: B.W. Construction Co.
- Architect: Lowenberg & Lowenberg
- Architectural style: Georgian Revival
- MPS: Hyde Park Apartment Hotels TR
- NRHP reference No.: 86001198
- Added to NRHP: May 14, 1986

The Mayfair Apartments are a historic apartment hotel at 1650–1666 E. 56th Street in the Hyde Park neighborhood of Chicago. Built in 1926, the building was part of a wave of residential department in Hyde Park, and it was one of several apartment hotels constructed there in the late 1910s and 1920s. Apartment hotels were popular among wealthy workers looking for part-time city housing, as they combined the amenities and prestige of a hotel with the price and location of apartments. The architecture firm Lowenberg & Lowenberg designed the building in the Georgian Revival style. The building's first three stories are clad with limestone and decorated with flat Corinthian columns and balustrades on the second-story windows. The remainder of the building is brick and includes a dentillated cornice at its roof and a second cornice above its eleventh story.

The building was added to the National Register of Historic Places on May 14, 1986.
