= Hyde Park, Chicago =

Community area in Chicago, Illinois

Hyde Park
- Community area
- Community Area 41 – Hyde Park
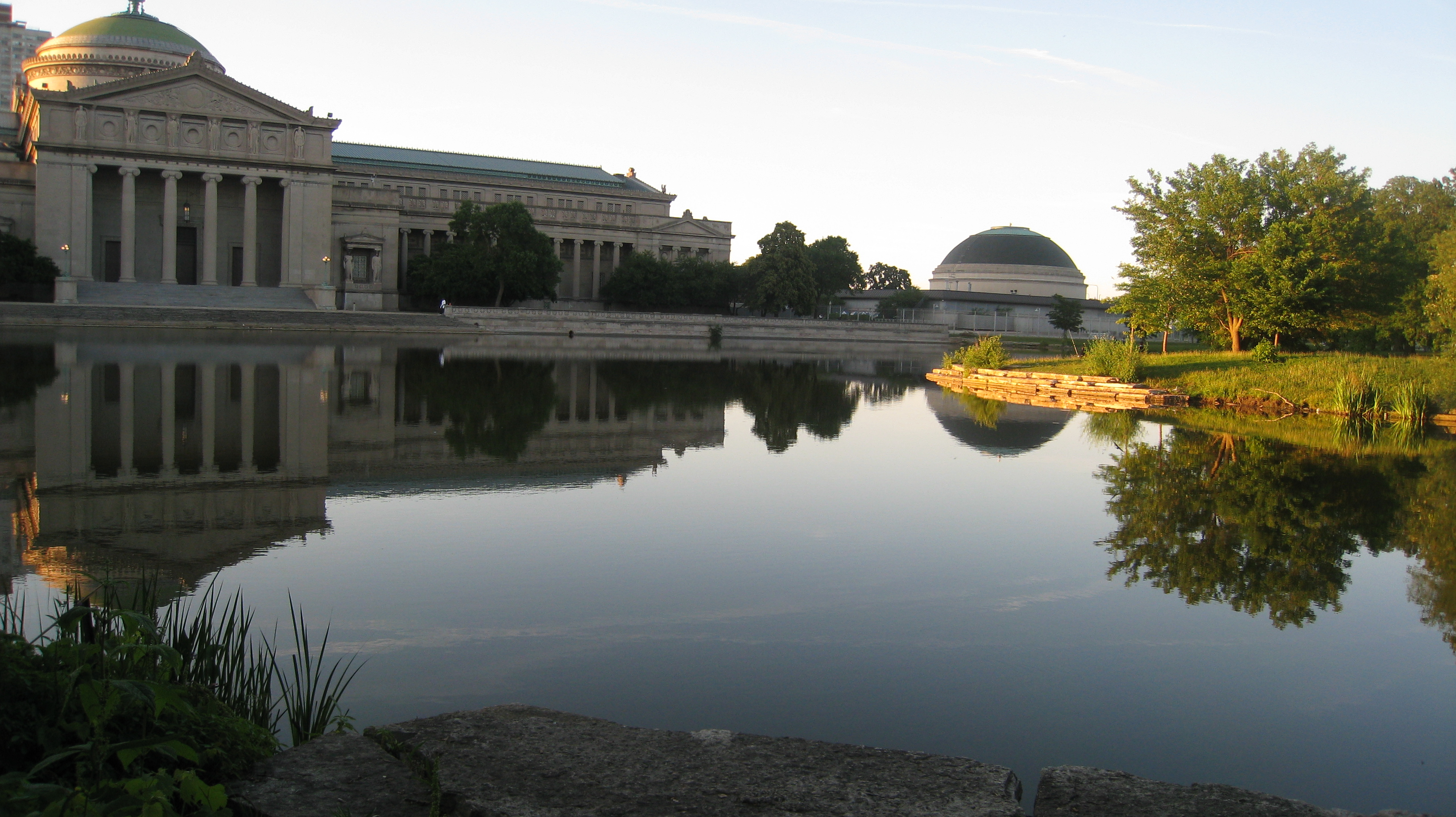
- Hyde Park in Chicago

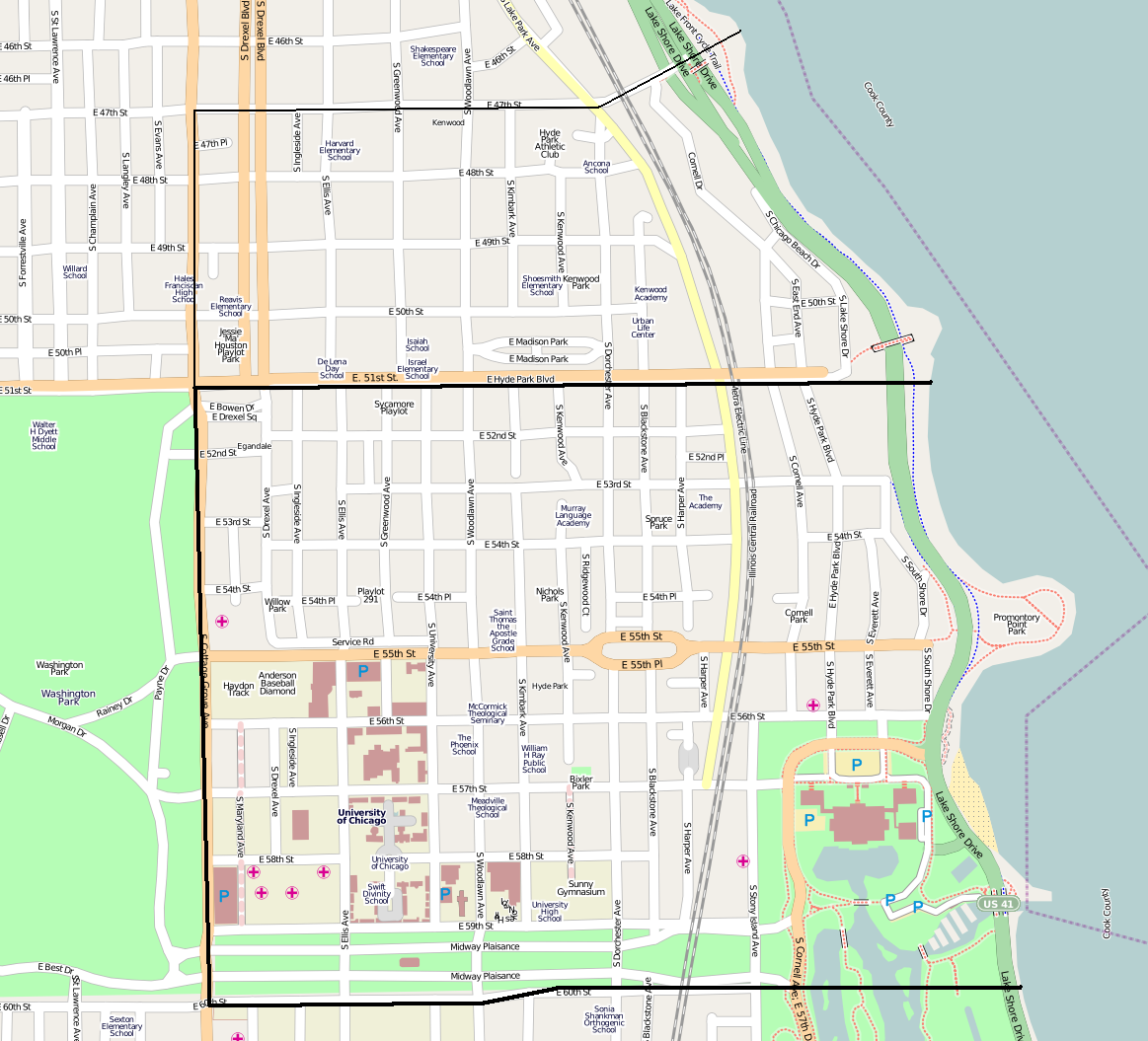
- The official Hyde Park community area (bold black) and the unofficial Hyde Park-Kenwood neighborhood extending into the official Kenwood community area (thin black).

- Location of Hyde Park in Chicago
- Coordinates: 41°48′N 87°35.4′W
- Country: United States
- State: Illinois
- County: Cook
- City: Chicago
- Named for: Hyde Park, New York
- Neighborhoods: List: Hyde Park; East Hyde Park

Area
  - Total: 1.65 sq mi (4.27 km^{2})

Population (2024)
  - Total: 30,599
  - Density: 18,600/sq mi (7,170/km^{2})

Demographics (2024)
  - White: 40.7%
  - Black: 26.0%
  - Asian: 16.9%
  - Hispanic: 8.1%
  - Other: 8.4%

Educational Attainment 2024
  - High School Diploma or Higher: 97.4%
  - Bachelor's Degree or Higher: 80.1%
- Time zone: UTC-6 (CST)
  - Summer (DST): UTC-5 (CDT)
- ZIP codes: parts of 60615 and 60637
- Median household income 2020: $52,423
- Source: U.S. Census, Record Information Services

Hyde Park is a neighborhood in and one of the 77 municipally recognized community areas of Chicago, Illinois, United States. It is on the South Side of the city, located on and near the shore of Lake Michigan, 7 miles (11 km) south of the Loop.

Hyde Park is home to the University of Chicago and several seminaries and graduate schools of theology. (Note: Catholic Theological Union, the Lutheran School of Theology at Chicago, the Chicago Theological Seminary, and McCormick Theological Seminary (in addition to, UChicago's own Divinity School)) The Griffin Museum of Science and Industry and two of Chicago's four historic sites listed in the original 1966 National Register of Historic Places—Chicago Pile-1, the world's first artificial nuclear reactor, and Robie House—are also in the neighborhood. In the early 21st century, Hyde Park received national attention for its association with U.S. president Barack Obama, who, before running for president, was a Senior Lecturer for twelve years at the University of Chicago Law School, an Illinois state senator representing the area, and U.S. senator from Illinois. The Barack Obama Presidential Center is in Jackson Park, on its border with Hyde Park.

Hyde Park's boundaries and subdivisions have several local definitions. The community area's formal boundaries are 51st Street (signed locally as Hyde Park Boulevard) on the north, Midway Plaisance on the south, Washington Park on the west, and Lake Michigan on the east. Another local definition considers a section to the north between 47th Street and Hyde Park Boulevard to be in Hyde Park, although this area is, according to municipal boundaries, the southern half of the Kenwood community area. As such, it is often called "South Kenwood". Hyde Park and South Kenwood are also sometimes collectively termed "Hyde Park-Kenwood" (as in the name of the epoynmous Historic District, for example). Meanwhile, the portion of Hyde Park that lies between the Illinois Central Railroad tracks and the lake is usually referred to as "East Hyde Park" and is usually also taken to include "Indian Village", the small southeastern corner of Kenwood.

== History ==
=== Founding and early years ===
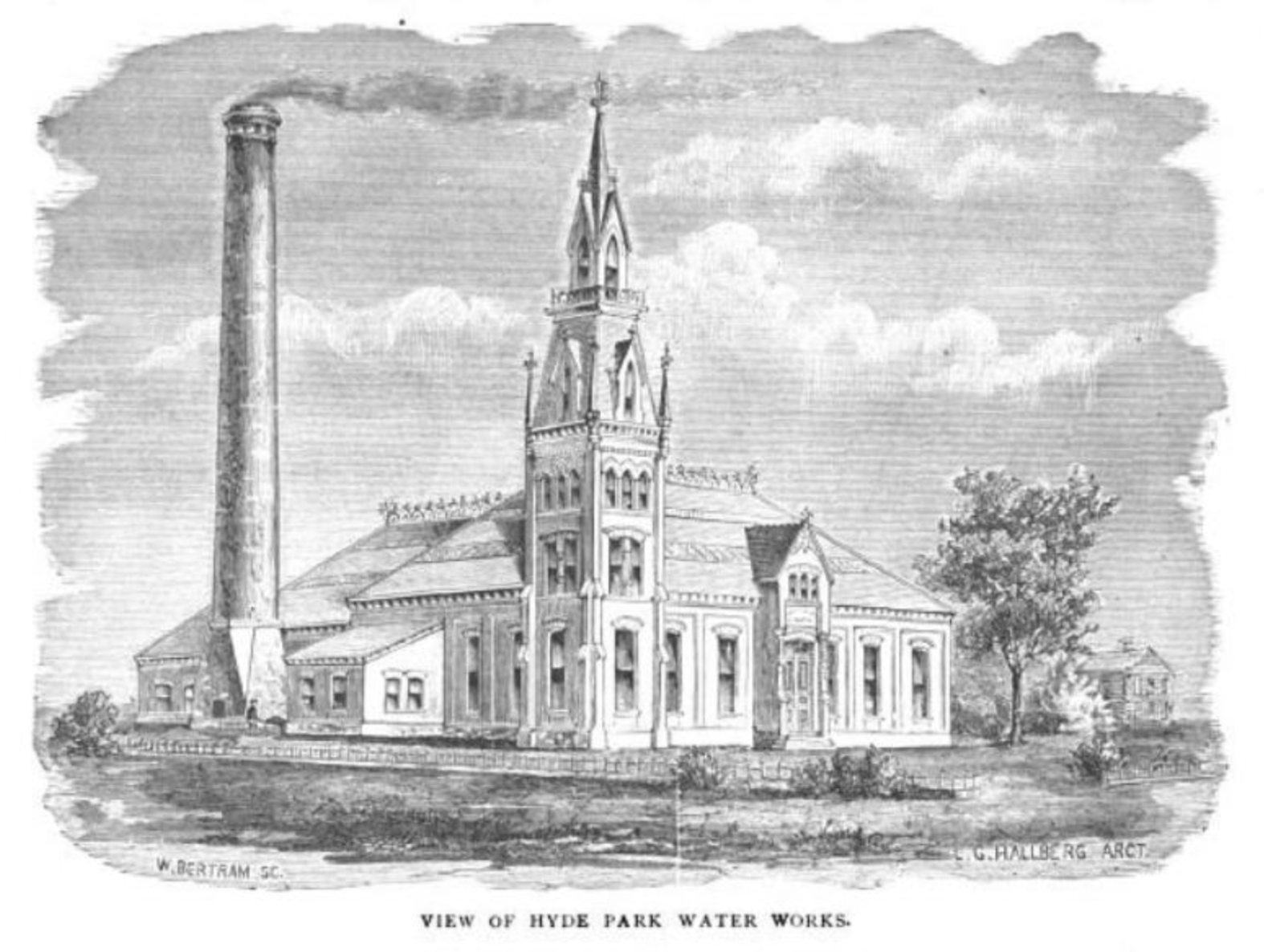
Engraving of the Hyde Park Water Works, 1882

In 1853, Paul Cornell, a real estate speculator and cousin of Cornell University founder Ezra Cornell, purchased 300 acres (1.2 km^{2}) of land between 51st and 55th streets along the shore of Lake Michigan, with the idea of attracting other Chicago businessmen and their families to the area. The neighborhood was named after a hamlet on the Hudson River of the same name in New York. The land was located seven miles south of Downtown Chicago in a rural area that enjoyed weather tempered by the lake – cooler in the summer and warmer in the winter. It was conveniently located near the Illinois Central Railroad, which had been constructed two years earlier. Cornell successfully negotiated land in exchange for a railroad station at 53rd Street. Hyde Park quickly became a suburban retreat for affluent Chicagoans who wanted to escape the noise and congestion of the rapidly growing city.

In 1857, the Hyde Park House, an upscale hotel, was built on the shore of Lake Michigan near the 53rd Street railroad station. For two decades, the Hyde Park House served as a focal point of Hyde Park social life. During this period, it was visited or lived in by many prominent guests, including Mary Todd Lincoln, who lived there with her children for two and a half months in the summer of 1865 (shortly after her husband was assassinated). The Hyde Park House burned down in an 1879 fire. The Sisson Hotel was built on the site in 1918 and was eventually converted into a condominium building (the Hampton House).

In 1861, Hyde Park was incorporated into an independent township (called Hyde Park Township). Its boundaries were Pershing Road (39th Street) on the north, 138th Street on the south, State Street on the west, and Lake Michigan and the Indiana state line on the east. The territory of the township encompassed most of what is now the South Side of Chicago. Hyde Park Township remained independent of Chicago until it was annexed to the city in 1889. After annexation, the definition of Hyde Park as a Chicago neighborhood was restricted to the historic core of the former township, centered on Cornell's initial development between 51st and 55th streets near the lakefront.

The Hyde Park Herald, the neighborhood's community newspaper, was established in 1882 and continues to be published weekly.

=== Growth and notability ===
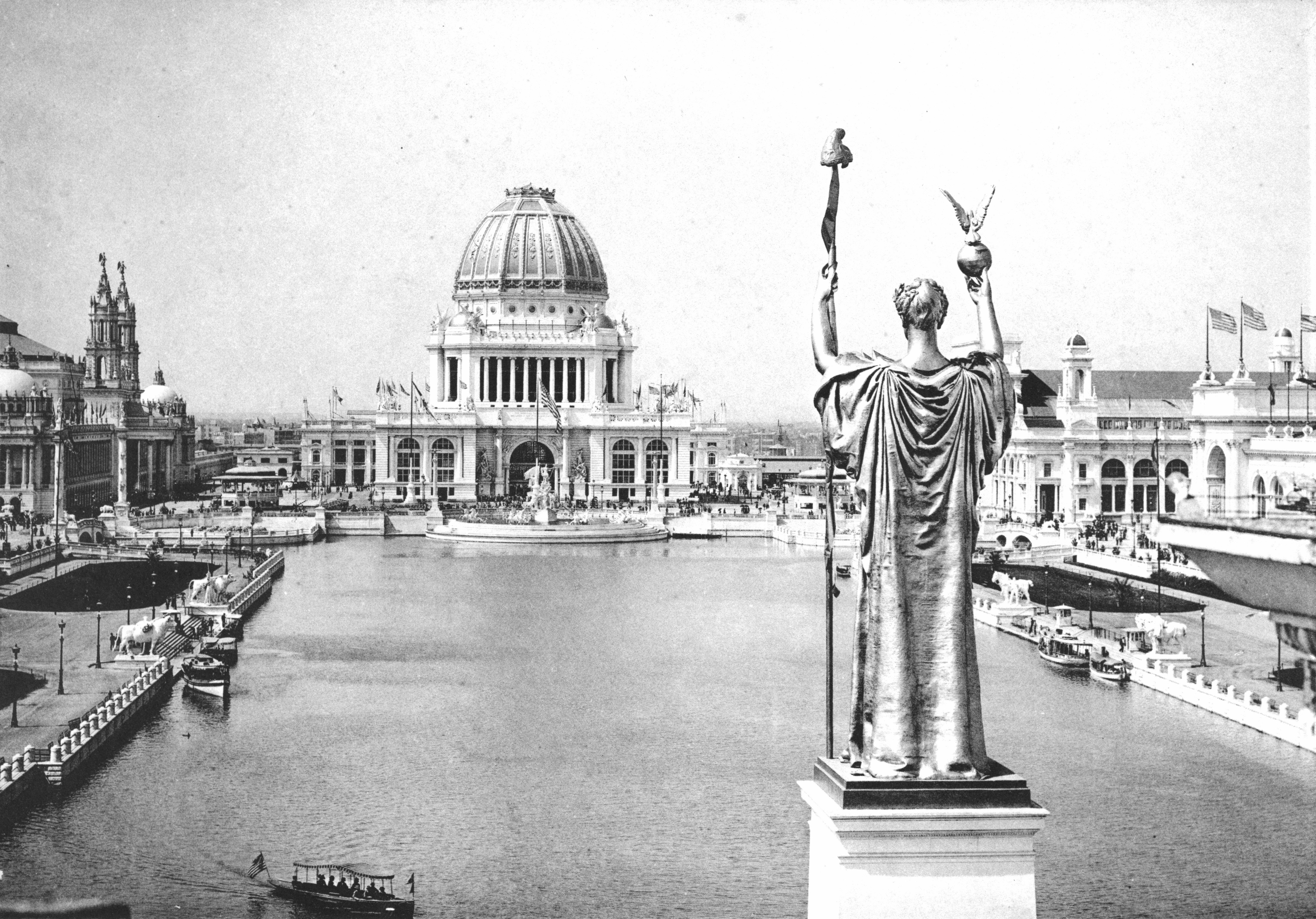
In 1893, the World's Columbian Exposition was held in Hyde Park and Woodlawn.

In 1891, two years after the city of Chicago annexed Hyde Park, the University of Chicago was established in the neighborhood through the philanthropy of John D. Rockefeller and the leadership of William Rainey Harper.

In 1893, Hyde Park hosted the World's Columbian Exposition (a world's fair marking the 400th anniversary of Christopher Columbus' arrival in the New World). The World's Columbian Exposition brought fame to the neighborhood, which gave rise to an inflow of new residents and spurred new development that gradually started transforming Hyde Park into a more urban area. However, since most of the structures built for the fair were temporary, it left few direct traces in the neighborhood. The only major structure from the fair that is still standing today is Charles Atwood's Palace of Fine Arts, which has since been converted into the Museum of Science and Industry.

In the early decades of the twentieth century, many upscale hotels were built in Hyde Park (mostly along the lakefront). Hyde Park became a resort area in Chicago. Most of these hotels closed during the Great Depression, and were eventually converted into apartment and condominium buildings (most of which are still standing today).

Historical images of Hyde Park can be found in Explore Chicago Collections, a digital repository made available by Chicago Collections archives, libraries and other cultural institutions in the city.

=== Racial integration, economic decline, and urban renewal ===
Until the middle of the twentieth century, Hyde Park remained an almost exclusively white neighborhood (despite its proximity to Chicago's Black Belt). Hyde Parkers relied on racially restrictive covenants to keep African Americans out of the neighborhood. At the time, the use of such covenants was supported by the University of Chicago.

After the Supreme Court banned racially restrictive covenants in 1948, African Americans began moving into Hyde Park, and the neighborhood gradually became multiracial. In 1955, civil rights activist Leon Despres was elected alderman of Hyde Park and held the position for twenty years. Despres argued passionately for racial integration and fair housing on the floor of the Chicago City Council, and became known as the "liberal conscience of Chicago" for often casting the sole dissenting vote against the policies of Chicago's then-mayor Richard J. Daley.

During the 1950s, Hyde Park experienced economic decline as a result of the white flight that followed the rapid inflow of African Americans into the neighborhood. In the 1950s and 1960s, the University of Chicago, in its effort to counteract these trends, sponsored one of the largest urban renewal plans in the nation. The plan involved the demolition and redevelopment of entire blocks of supposedly decayed buildings with the goal of creating an "interracial community of high standards." After the plan was carried out, Hyde Park's average income soared by seventy percent, but its African American population fell by forty percent, since the substandard housing primarily occupied by low-income African Americans had been purchased, torn down, and replaced, with the residents not being able to afford to remain in the newly rehabilitated areas. The ultimate result of the renewal plan was that Hyde Park did not experience the economic depression that occurred in the surrounding areas and became a racially integrated middle-class neighborhood.

== Subdivisions ==
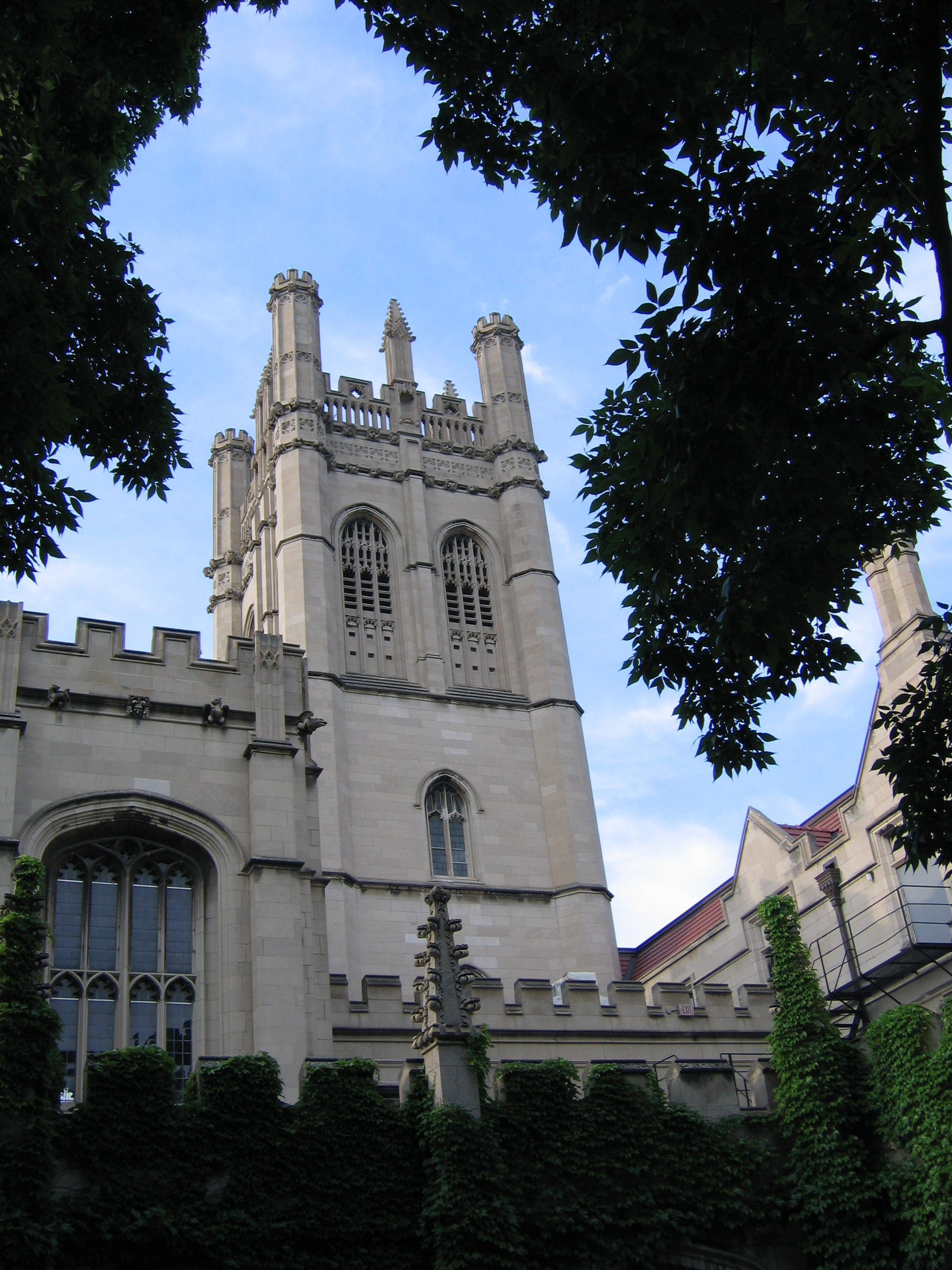
The southwestern part of Hyde Park serves as the campus of the University of Chicago

=== The University of Chicago ===
The main campus of the University of Chicago—including Pritzker School of Medicine, the University of Chicago Hospital, the historic Main Quadrangles, and the Booth School of Business—is bounded by Washington Park on the west, 55th Street on the north and 61st Street on the south, placing most of the university within Hyde Park's southwestern quadrant (with the remainder, south of the Midway, being in Woodlawn). The university also owns a number of additional properties throughout Hyde Park, with many concentrated along a narrow corridor along 59th Street between the central campus and the Metra tracks—including, for example, the University of Chicago Laboratory Schools and International House. Due to the university's proximity, the blocks just east of the central campus are dominated by (privately owned) student and faculty residences.

=== East Hyde Park ===
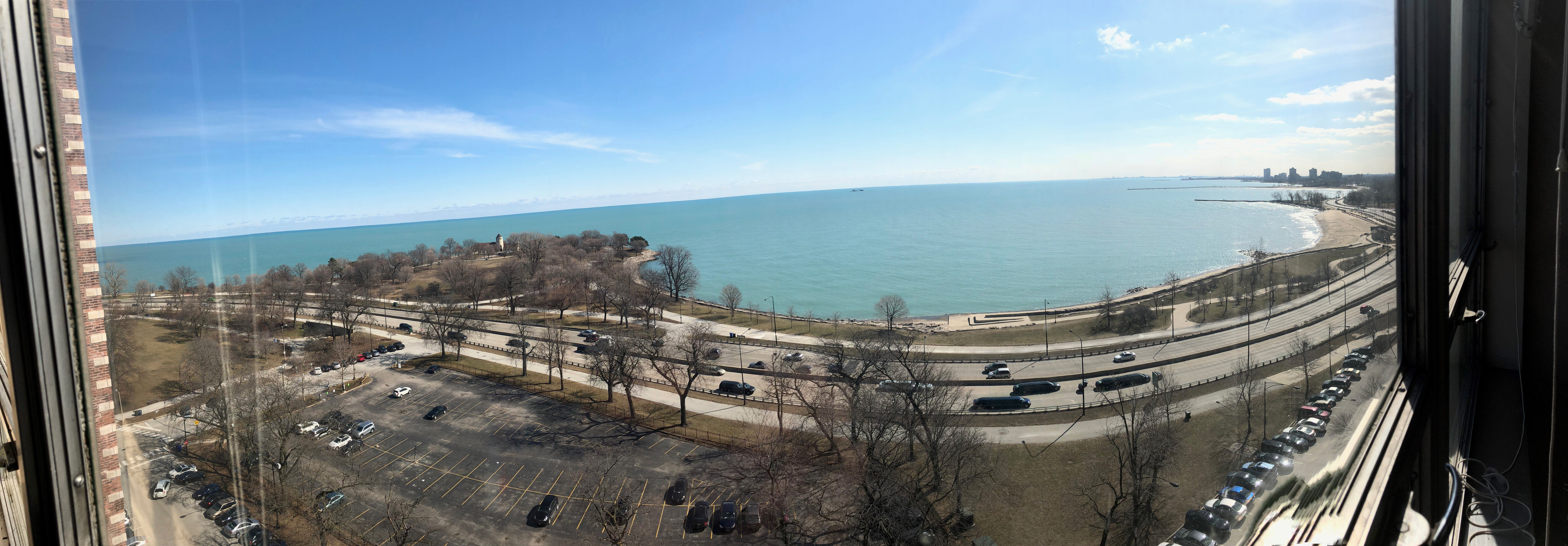
Looking east along South Shore Drive near 55th St. in Hyde Park (aka East Hyde Park)

The part of Hyde Park located east of the Metra tracks is locally called East Hyde Park. This area, the part of Hyde Park nearest to Lake Michigan, has a large number of high-rise condominiums, many of them facing the lakefront. Some of these condominiums are remnants of older hotels, like The Mayfair or Regents Park. In this respect, East Hyde Park differs markedly from the rest of Hyde Park, where the vast majority of residences are either three-story apartment buildings or single-family homes (with only a small number of high-rise condominiums).

=== South Kenwood ===
U.S. President Barack Obama lived in Hyde park for 12 years and has owned a home adjacent to Hyde Park since 2005.

Although the neighborhood bounded by 47th Street on the north, 51st Street (Hyde Park Boulevard) on the south, Cottage Grove Avenue on the west, and Lake Michigan on the east is officially the southern half of the Kenwood community area, it is often considered part of Hyde Park due to the two areas' shared culture and history; "Hyde Park-Kenwood" is thus sometimes applied to this collective area (as in, e.g., the "Hyde Park-Kenwood Historic District"). Some differences are nonetheless apparent: unlike Hyde Park, which is dominated by three- and four-story apartment buildings and modest family homes, southern Kenwood boasts a great many luxurious mansions, built mainly at the end of the nineteenth and the beginning of the twentieth centuries for wealthy Chicagoans. A number of prominent Chicagoans currently reside or own homes in this area, including former U.S. president Barack Obama and Nation of Islam leader Louis Farrakhan. Boxer Muhammad Ali and former Nation of Islam leader Elijah Muhammad also once resided in south Kenwood.

== Demographics ==
Historical population
Census	Pop.	Note	%±
1930	48,017		—
1940	50,550		5.3%
1950	55,206		9.2%
1960	45,577		−17.4%
1970	33,531		−26.4%
1980	31,198		−7.0%
1990	28,630		−8.2%
2000	29,920		4.5%
2010	25,681		−14.2%
2020	29,456		14.7%

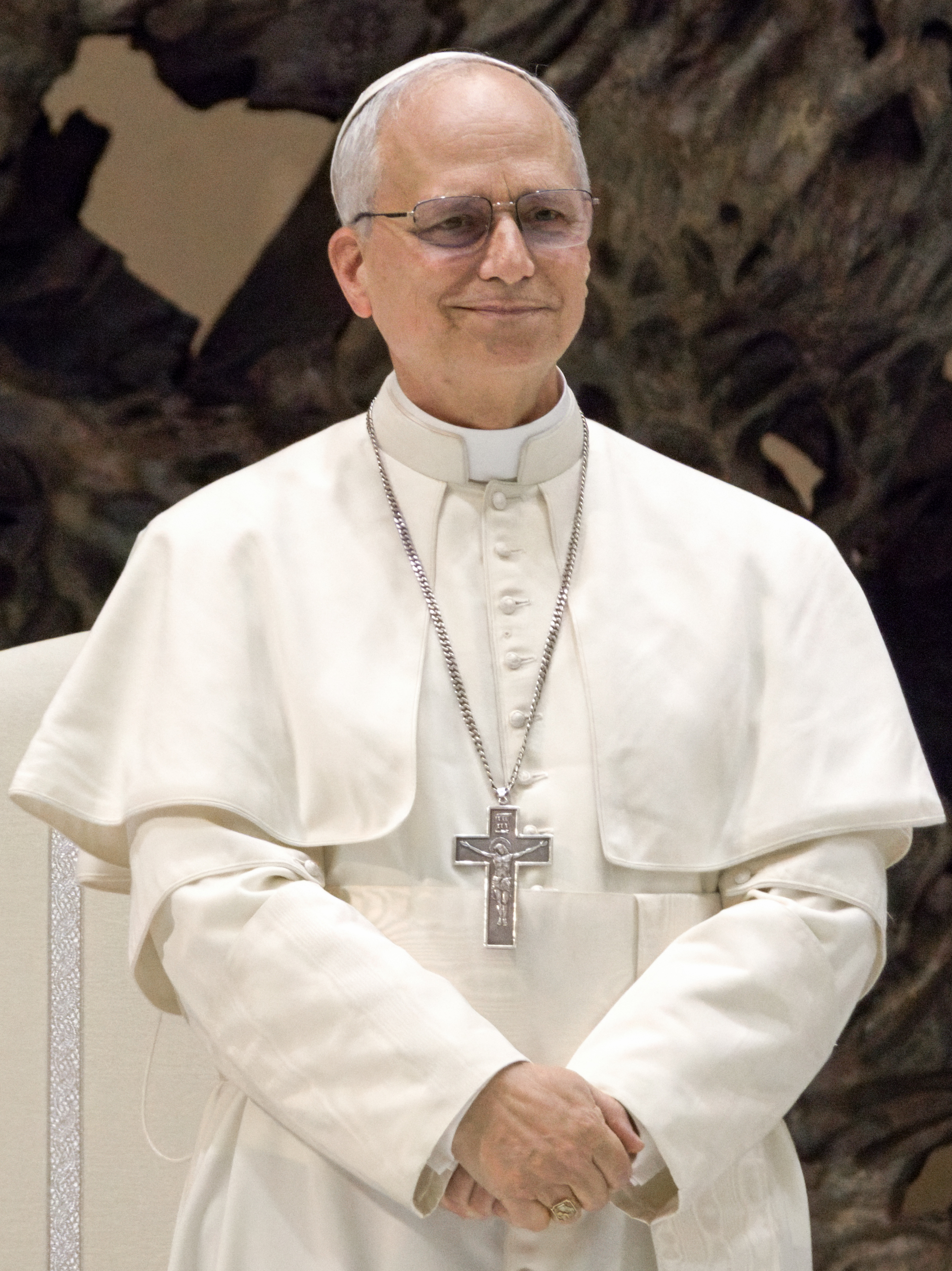
Pope Leo XIV completed graduate studies while living in Hyde Park.

Hyde Park is a very racially diverse neighborhood. As of 2023, the neighborhood's residents are 40.2% White, 28.0% Black, 15.5% Asian, and 8.0% Hispanic, while a further 8.3% identified as belonging to two or more races. The neighborhood's northern and southern halves exhibit some demographic differences, however: south of 55th Street, the population is predominantly white and Asian-American, with a smaller percentage of African-Americans and Hispanics. North of 55th Street, African-Americans make up approximately half of the population, and there is a more robust Hispanic presence.

Hyde Park's location in the center of the predominantly African-American South Side, as well as the neighborhood's large population of affluent and upper-middle class Black residents, have made it an important cultural and political hub for Chicago's Black community. Many of Chicago's prominent African-American politicians live or have lived in Hyde Park, including former Chicago mayor Harold Washington, the city's first Black mayor; former U.S. Senator Carol Moseley Braun, the first Black female U.S. senator; former U.S. President Barack Obama; Toni Preckwinkle, the current President of the Cook County Board of Commissioners; and Kwame Raoul, the current Attorney General of Illinois.

== Landmarks ==
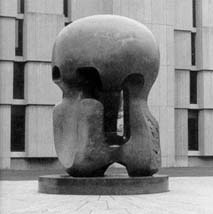
Nuclear Energy, a sculpture by Henry Moore marking the site of Chicago Pile-1, the world's first nuclear reactor.

The following Hyde Park community area properties have been added to the National Register of Historic Places: Chicago Beach Apartments, Arthur H. Compton House, East Park Towers, Chicago Pile-1, Flamingo-on-the-Lake Apartments, Mayfair Apartments, Isadore H. Heller House, Charles Hitchcock Hall, Hotel Del Prado, Hotel Windermere East, Frank R. Lillie House, Robert A. Millikan House, Poinsettia Apartments, Promontory Apartments, Jackson Shore Apartments, Frederick C. Robie House, George Herbert Jones Laboratory, St. Thomas Church and Convent, Shoreland Hotel, German submarine U-505, and University Apartments.

In addition, the NRHP Hyde Park-Kenwood Historic District and Jackson Park Historic Landscape District and Midway Plaisance are located, at least in part, within the Hyde Park community area.

== Parks ==
=== Promontory Point ===
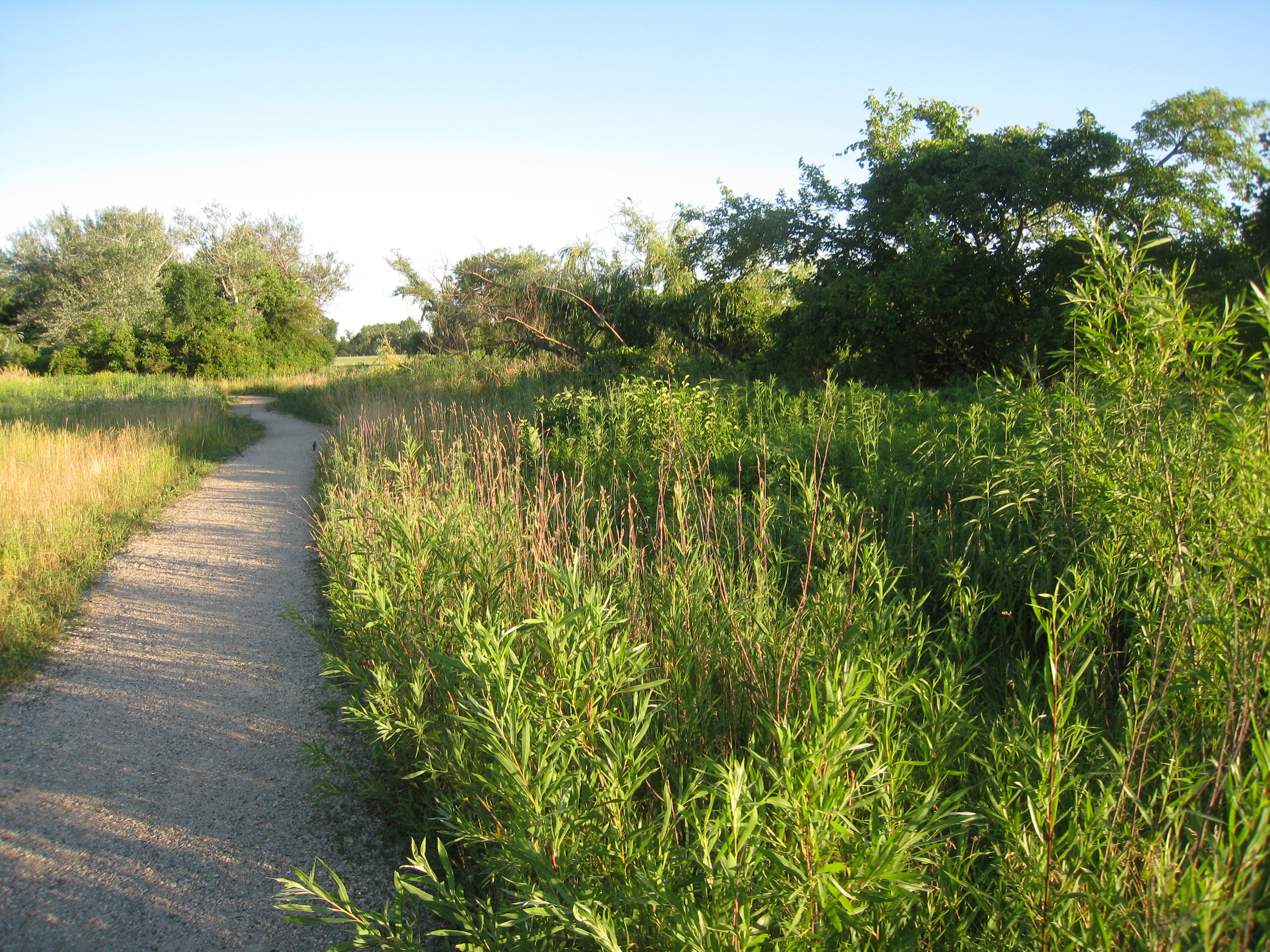
A trail in Jackson Park

Promontory Point is an artificial peninsula that extends into Lake Michigan at 55th Street, providing views of the Downtown Chicago skyline to the north. Promontory Point is a common location for picnicking, sunbathing, and swimming. It made news as the location of the wedding reception between George Lucas and Mellody Hobson in June 2013.

=== Jackson Park ===
The southeastern corner of Hyde Park contains the northern end of Jackson Park. Jackson Park consists of lagoons surrounding an island in the middle (called the Wooded Island), on which a small Japanese garden is located. It is home to a large population of beavers and over two dozen species of birds. The Midway Plaisance, a wide boulevard that runs from Stony Island Avenue to Cottage Grove Avenue between 59th and 60th streets, connects Jackson Park to Washington Park (located to the west of Hyde Park).

Jackson Park has been selected by the Obama Foundation as the site of the future Obama Presidential Center.

== Retail corridors ==
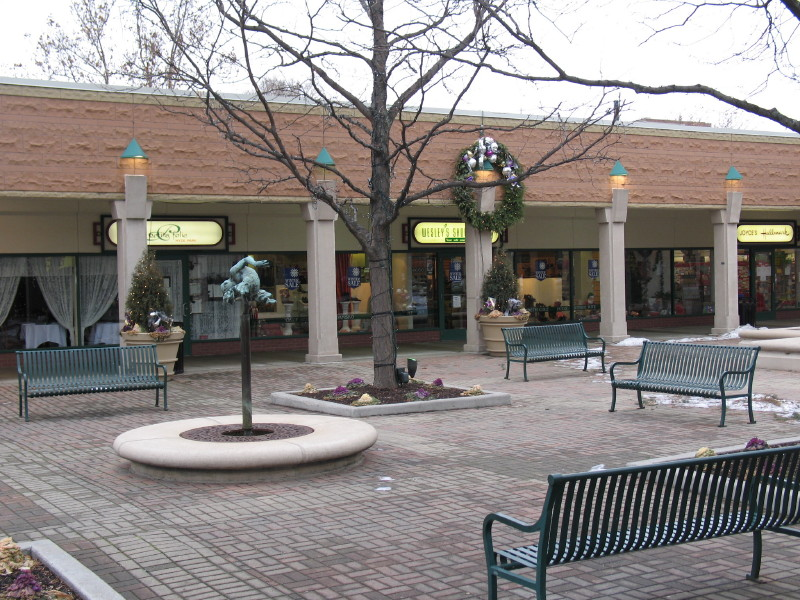
The courtyard of the Hyde Park Shopping Center

The shopping areas on 53rd, 55th, and 57th streets host most of the retail businesses in Hyde Park.

=== 53rd Street ===
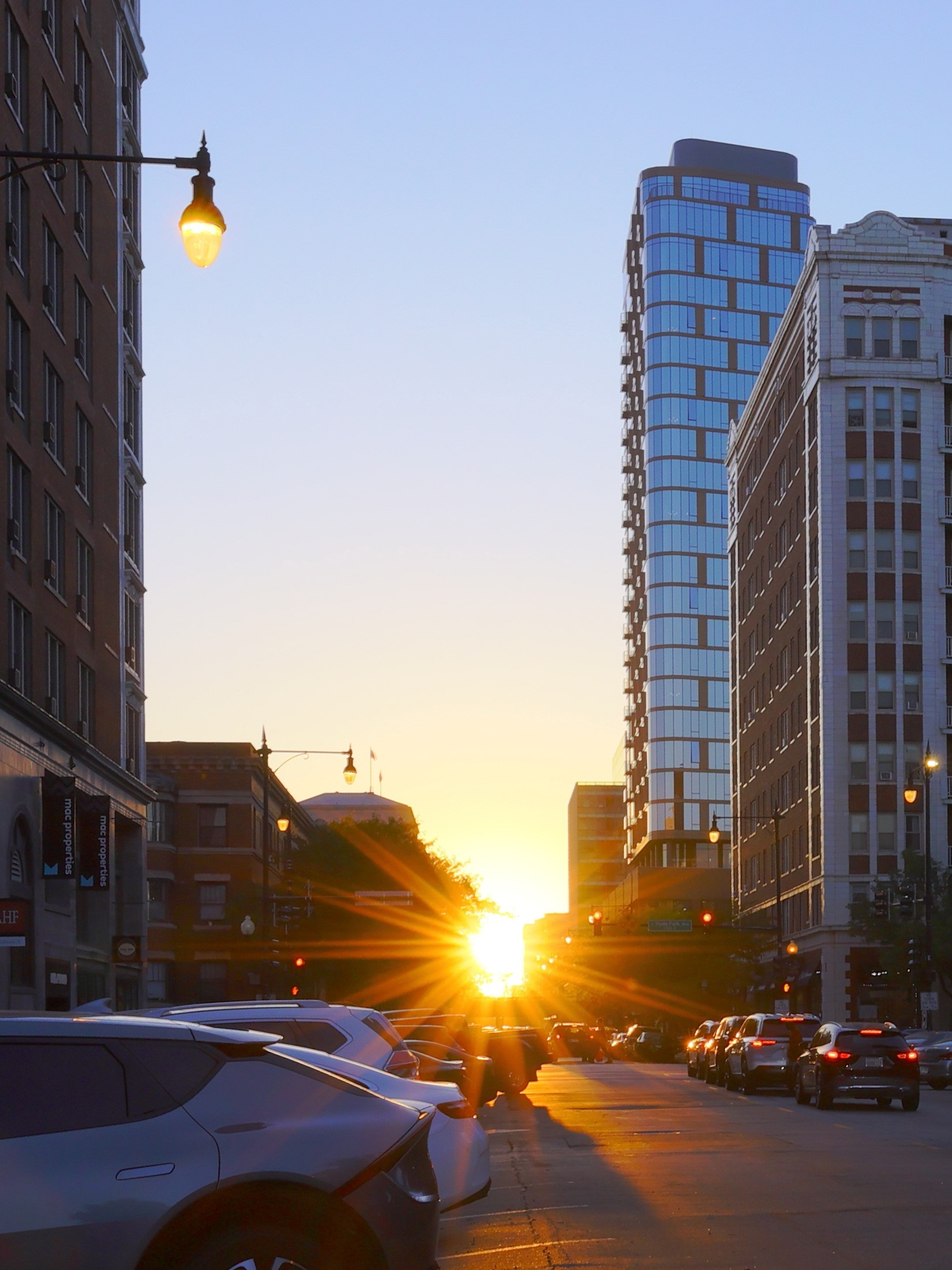
A diffraction spike over the Metra Electric District tracks at 53rd Street with East Park Towers and 5252 South Cornell in the foreground.

53rd Street is Hyde Park's oldest shopping district, lined with many small businesses and restaurants offering various dining options. Harper Court, a small-business-oriented shopping center, extends north of 53rd Street along Harper Avenue. A farmers' market is held there in the summer.

=== 55th Street ===
The segment of 55th Street between the Metra line and the lake offers a series of ethnic restaurants serving Thai, Japanese, and Korean cuisine. To the west of the Metra line between 54th and 55th streets lies the Hyde Park Shopping Center.

Among the best-known establishments on East 55th Street is Woodlawn Tap ("Jimmy's"), a neighborhood bar operating continuously since 1948.

=== 57th Street ===
57th Street is noted for its independent bookstores. 57th Street also offers restaurants along with small grocery stores, hair stylists, and dry cleaners. On the first weekend in June, the venerable 57th Street Art Fair takes up 57th Street between Kimbark and Kenwood avenues.

== Museums ==
- DuSable Museum of African American History (located just outside Hyde Park on the eastern edge of Washington Park)
- Hyde Park Art Center
- Museum of Science and Industry
- Institute for the Study of Ancient Cultures – an archaeology museum (mostly focusing on the ancient Near East) within the University of Chicago.
- Smart Museum of Art – an art museum within the University of Chicago.

== Educational institutions ==
- Catholic Theological Union – a seminary of Roman Catholic religious orders and lay women and men.
- Chicago Theological Seminary – a seminary of the United Church of Christ.
- Lutheran School of Theology at Chicago – a seminary of the Evangelical Lutheran Church in America.
- McCormick Theological Seminary – a seminary of the Presbyterian Church.
- University of Chicago – a private research university.
- University of Chicago Laboratory Schools – a private coeducational nursery-12 school founded by educational reformer John Dewey in 1896.

== Churches and houses of worship ==
- Congregation Rodfei Zedek
- The First Baptist Church of Chicago, the oldest Baptist church in the city
- First Unitarian Church of Chicago
- The Hyde Park Chapel of the Church of Jesus Christ of Latter-day Saints
- The Hyde Park Seventh-day Adventist Church
- Hyde Park Union Church
- KAM Isaiah Israel
- Rockefeller Chapel
- St. Paul & the Redeemer Episcopal Church
- St. Thomas Church and Convent
- 57th Street Meeting of Friends, a Quaker meeting for worship
- University Church

== Politics ==
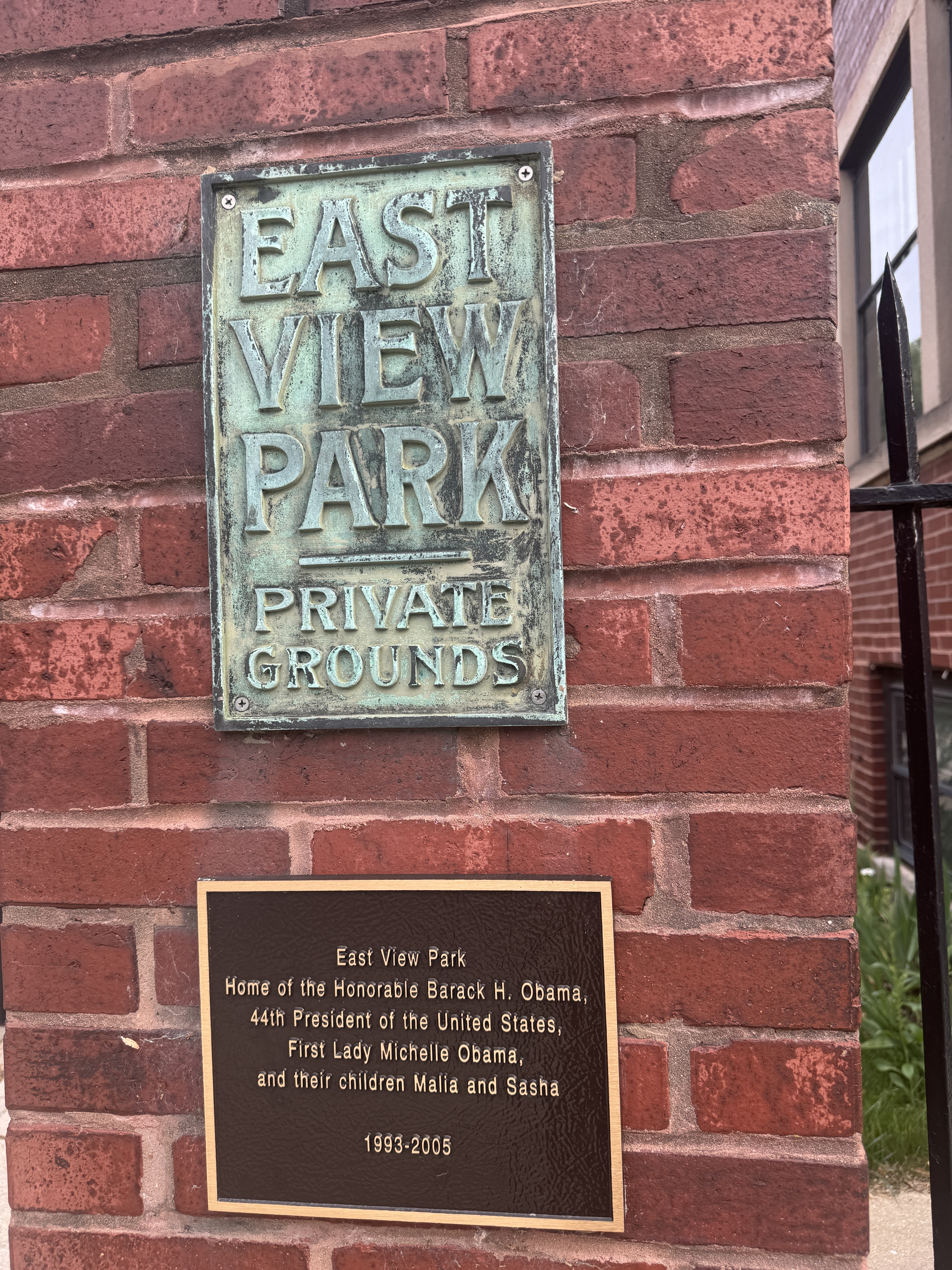
Plaque documenting that the Obama family resided in a cul-de-sac at 54th and Shore Drive until the year he became a United States Senator

The Hyde Park community area has supported the Democratic Party in the past two presidential elections by overwhelming margins. In the 2016 presidential election, Hyde Park cast 10,479 votes for Hillary Clinton and 442 votes for Donald Trump (91.9% to 3.9%). In the 2012 presidential election, Hyde Park cast 9,991 votes for Barack Obama and cast 651 votes for Mitt Romney (91.4% to 6.0%).

== Transportation ==
By car, Hyde Park is easily accessed from Lake Shore Drive, which runs along the neighborhood's easternmost edge. The Dan Ryan Expressway and Chicago Skyway also lie within a short driving distance.

In terms of public transit, Hyde Park is served by eleven Chicago Transit Authority bus lines; Metra, Chicago's commuter rail system; and the South Shore Line, an interurban passenger rail service that runs between Chicago and South Bend, Indiana. The latter two use the former Illinois Central Railroad's embankment in East Hyde Park, near Lake Michigan.

The Metra Electric—which has three stations in the neighborhood (51st/53rd St./Hyde Park, 55th-56th-57th St., and 59th St./University of Chicago)—and the CTA's #6 Jackson Park Express bus provide express service to the Loop from early morning to late night. The #2 Hyde Park Express and #28 Stony Island busses provide similar service during rush hours. Off-peak, however, the #2 does not run, while the #28 does so only to points south. CTA's #10 Museum of Science and Industry route also provides express service to downtown, but only between Memorial and Labor Days and from one stop at the museum itself.

CTA's #15 Jeffrey Local bus runs diagonally through Hyde Park, connecting the neighborhood to points south and to CTA's rapid transit system, the "L", at the Red Lines' 47th station and the Green Lines' 47th and 51st stations. The #55 Garfield bus runs east–west through the neighborhood, connecting it to the Garfield (Red Line) and Garfield (Green Line) stations, and, ultimately, to Chicago's Midway Airport. The #4 Cottage Grove and #X4 Cottage Grove Express bus routes run north–south along Hyde Park's westernmost edge.

The University of Chicago operates shuttles that operate within Hyde Park, with some routes going to Woodlawn, Fuller Park (for Garfield (Red Line) and Garfield (Green Line)), Kenwood or the Loop. The university also has the Via RideSmart ride-sharing service for students on campus and the immediate Hyde Park neighborhood. CTA also operates three bus routes in collaboration with the University of Chicago: #171 University of Chicago/Hyde Park, #172 University of Chicago/Kenwood, and #192 University of Chicago Hospitals Express. The #171 and #172 are local circulator routes that run on a reduced schedule during the summer, while the #192 runs during rush hours only to and from major rail stations in the Loop.

South Shore Line trains stop only at 55th-56th-57th St. They only board passengers southbound and discharge passengers northbound due to a non-compete agreement with Metra.

== Notable people ==
- Gertrude Abercrombie – painter
- Muhammad Ali – boxer
- Young Roddo - artist
- Bill Ayers – educator, activist, terrorist
- Saul Bellow – writer, 1976 Nobel Prize laureate
- Lee Botts – environmentalist
- Chesa Boudin (born 1980) – 30th District Attorney of San Francisco (2020–2022). He was raised in Hyde Park by his legal guardians Bill Ayers and Bernardine Dohrn. His childhood in the neighborhood became a source of contention during his short-lived political career due to Ayers's and Dohrn's involvement in the Weather Underground, a terrorist organization.
- Carol Moseley Braun – U.S. Senator from Illinois
- Oscar Brown Jr. – singer, songwriter, playwright, poet, civil rights activist, and actor.
- Paul Butterfield – blues musician
- Subrahmanyan Chandrasekhar – astrophysicist, 1983 Nobel Prize laureate
- James W. Cronin – physicist, 1980 Nobel Prize laureate
- Clarence Darrow – lawyer
- Barbara Flynn Currie, former Illinois House of Representatives Majority Leader
- Leon Despres – civil rights activist
- William Dodd – U.S. Ambassador to Germany
- Bernardine Dohrn – lawyer, activist, convicted terrorist
- Paul Douglas – U.S. Senator from Illinois
- Arne Duncan – U.S. Secretary of Education
- Amelia Earhart (day resident as student of Hyde Park High School) – aviator
- Kurt Elling – jazz musician
- Louis Farrakhan – leader of the Nation of Islam.
- Enrico Fermi – physicist, 1938 Nobel Prize laureate
- Marshall Field – retail icon and founder of Marshall Field's
- Susan Fiske – social psychologist
- Milton Friedman – economist, 1976 Nobel Prize recipient, taught economics at the University of Chicago (1946–1977)
- Francis Fukuyama – political scientist
- Caroline Glick – journalist
- Dick Gregory – comedian, activist
- Austan Goolsbee – economist, writer, senior Obama administration official, former Chair of the Council of Economic Advisers
- Bonnie Harris – painter
- Hugh Hefner – magazine publisher, founder of Playboy
- Maria Hinojosa – journalist
- Mahalia Jackson – gospel singer
- Elena Kagan – Associate Justice of the Supreme Court
- Jim Karvellas – play-by-play sportscaster
- Echo Kellum (born 1982), actor and comedian known for his roles in Arrow and Sean Saves the World. He was a childhood resident of Hyde Park.
- Sydney Kamlager-Dove (born 1972), member of the United States House of Representatives from California's 37th congressional district since 2023. She was a childhood resident of Hyde Park
- Chaka Khan – singer
- R. Kelly – singer and convicted sex offender
- Karen Lewis (1953–2021) – American labor leader, former reform president of Chicago Teachers Union
- Ramsey Lewis – jazz musician
- Mary Todd Lincoln – wife of 16th U.S. President Abraham Lincoln
- John A. List – Distinguished Service Professor of Economics, University of Chicago
- Leopold and Loeb – convicted murderers
- Vic Mensa – rapper
- Albert Abraham Michelson – physicist, 1907 Nobel Prize laureate
- Robert Andrews Millikan – physicist, 1923 Nobel Prize laureate, Robert A. Millikan House is National Historic Landmark
- Elijah Muhammad – former leader of the Nation of Islam
- NeonSeon – writer and illustrator Seon Ricks
- Barack Obama – 44th President of the United States
- Clara Peller (1902–1987) – actress best known for her appearances in Where's the beef? campaign of Wendy's. She was a longtime Hyde Park resident.
- Richard Posner – former federal judge and senior lecturer at the University of Chicago Law School
- Toni Preckwinkle – Cook County Board President, activist
- Louis Marius Prevost (1920–1997) – father of Robert Francis Prevost, later Pope Leo XIV. Grew up at 5465 S. Ellis Ave.
- Pope Leo XIV – Pope Leo XIV pursued his Master of Divinity from Catholic Theological Union while residing in Hyde Park.
- Kwame Raoul – Illinois Attorney General
- Ronald Reagan – 40th President of the United States
- Janet D. Rowley – cytogeneticist and cancer research pioneer
- Antonin Scalia – Associate Justice of the Supreme Court, residency at the University of Chicago Law School (1977–1982)
- John Paul Stevens – Associate Justice of the Supreme Court
- George Stigler – economist, 1982 Nobel Prize laureate
- Dana L. Suskind – professor
- James Tiptree Jr. – author
- Harold Washington – Mayor of Chicago
- Bernard Wasserstein – professor
- Jody Watley – singer
- Henry Clay Work – composer
- Hubert Louis Will – federal judge
- Quentin Young – physician, a founder of Physicians for National Health Care (PNHP)

== Gallery ==
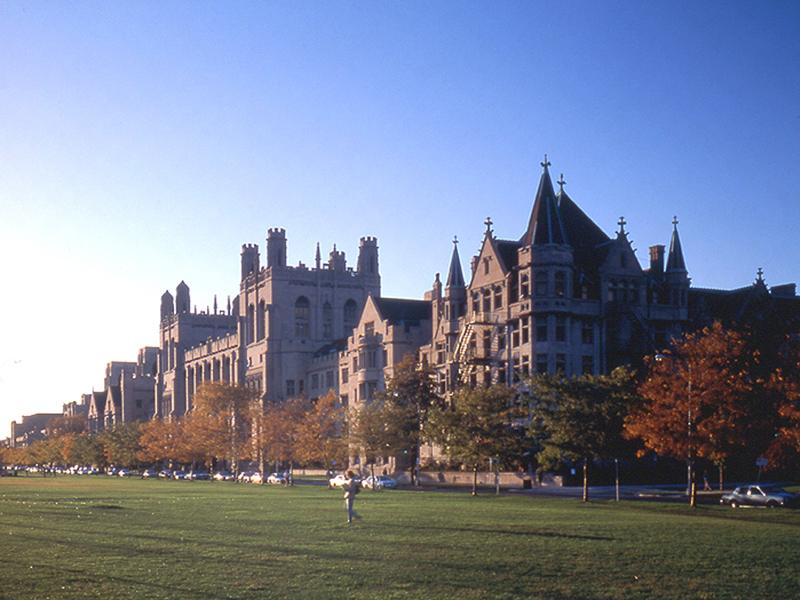
The University of Chicago as seen from the Midway Plaisance, a wide boulevard connecting Jackson Park and Washington Park.

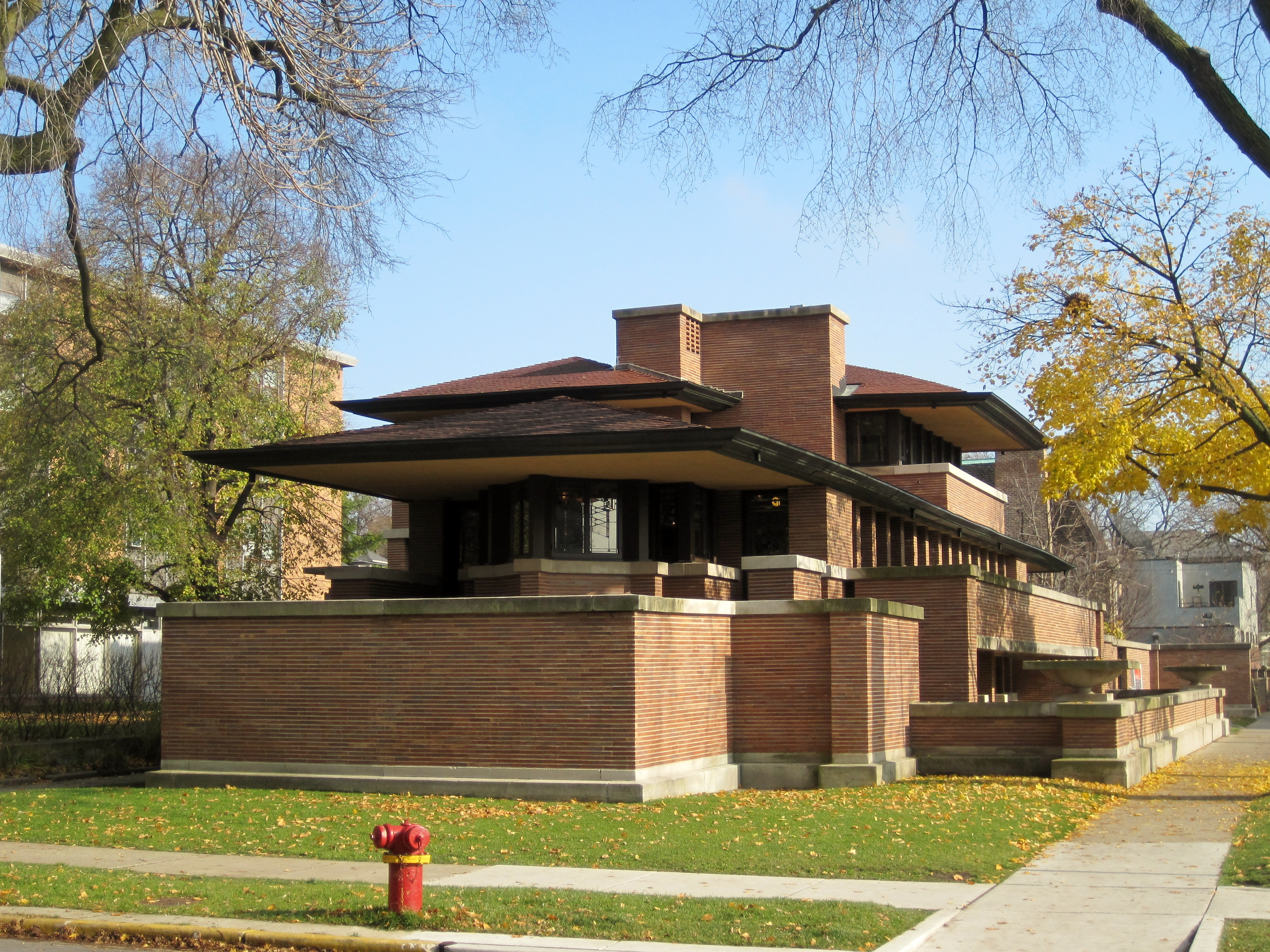
The Robie House, a National Historic Landmark designed by architect Frank Lloyd Wright in 1908.

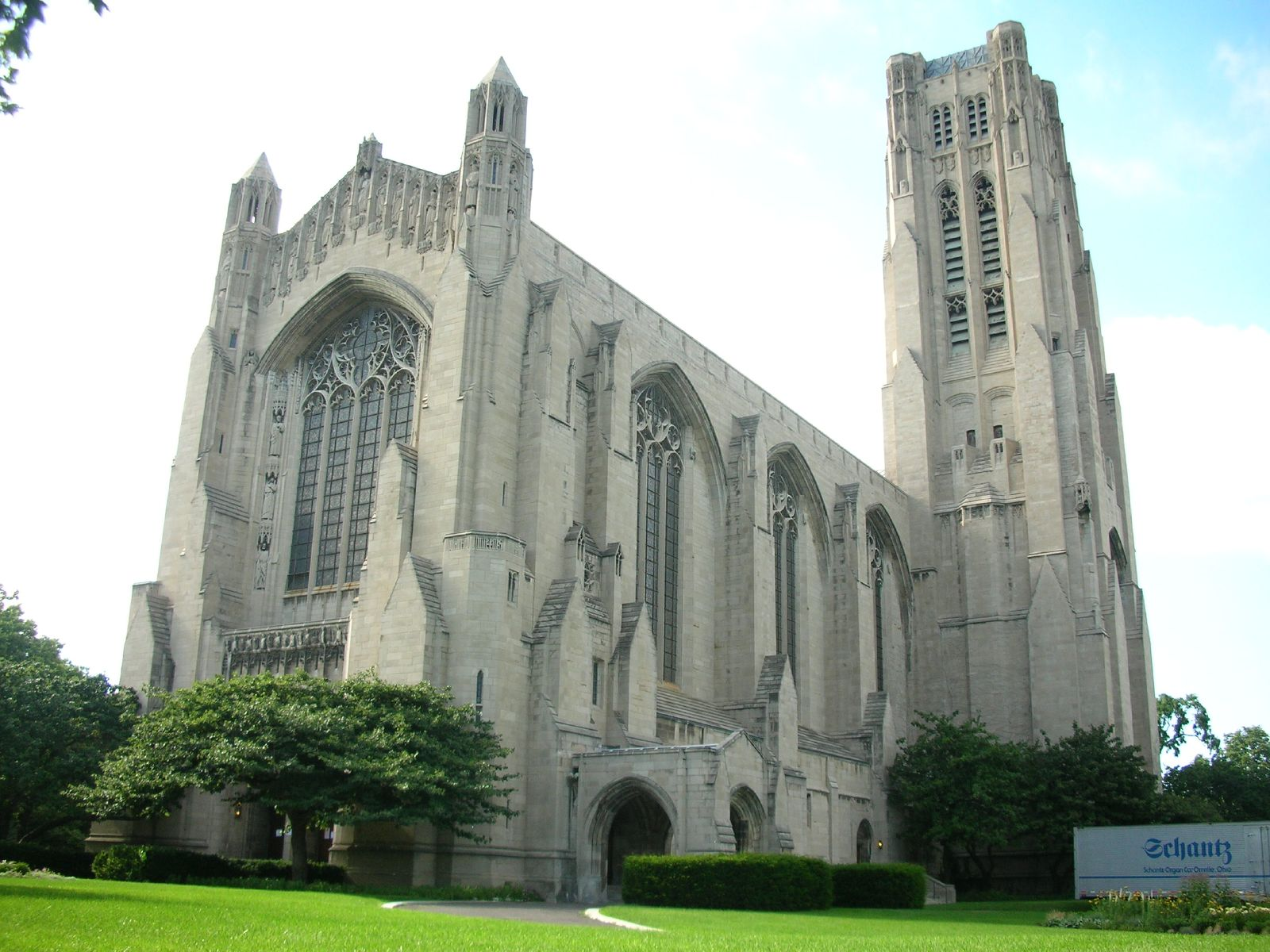
The Rockefeller Chapel, located on the University of Chicago campus and named after University of Chicago founder John D. Rockefeller.

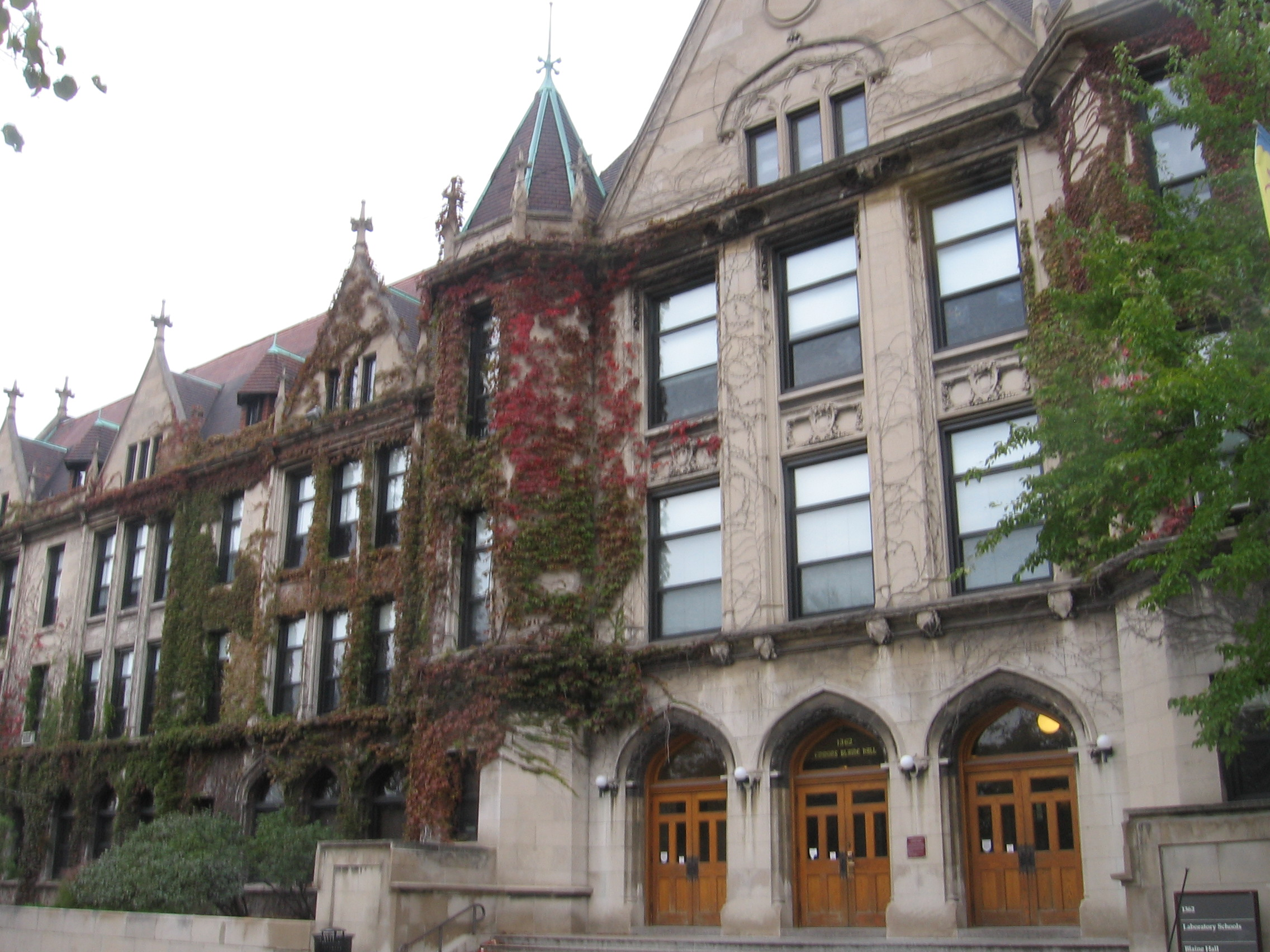
The University of Chicago Laboratory Schools, founded by the prominent educational reformer John Dewey in 1896.

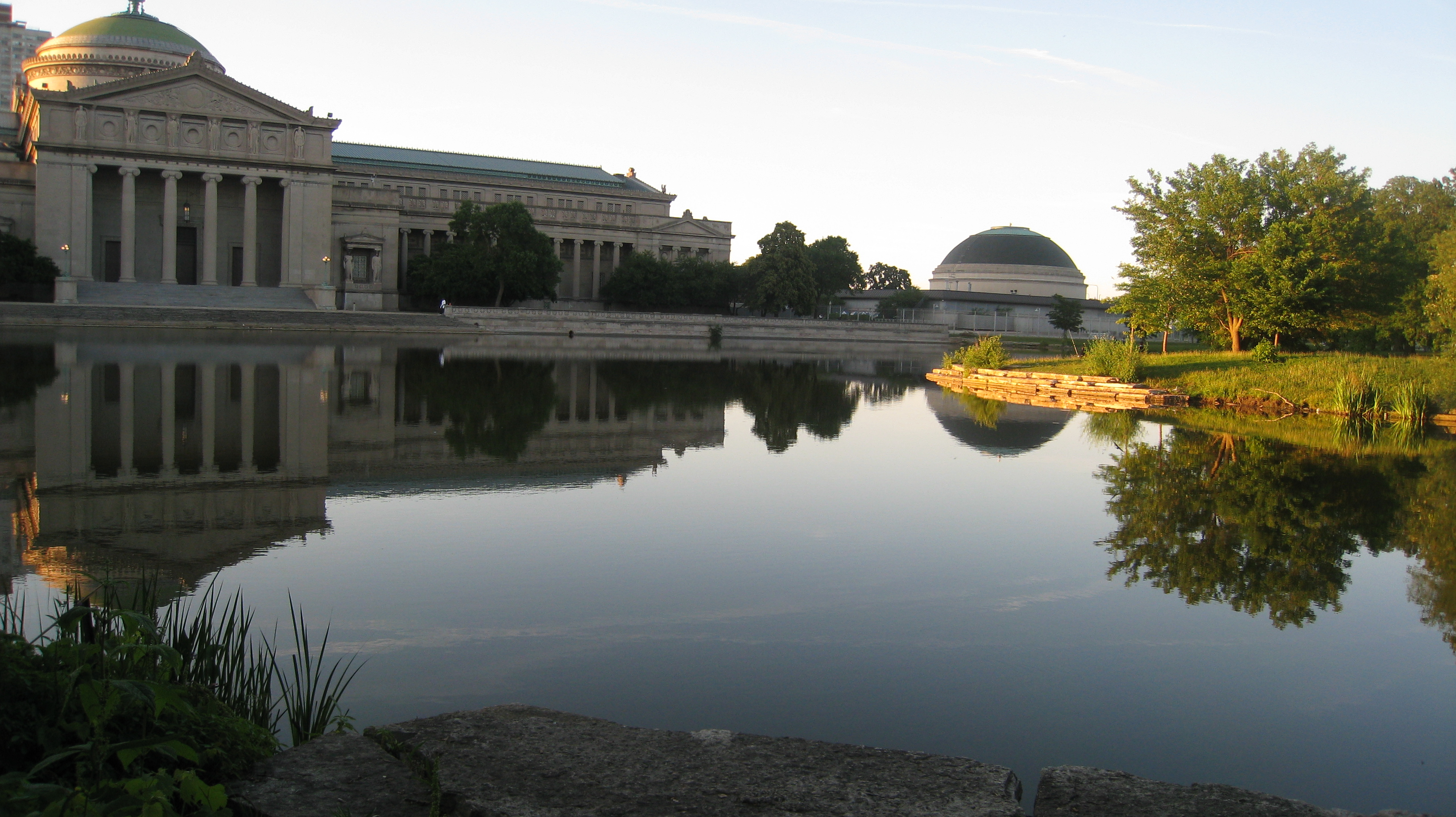
The Museum of Science and Industry, housed in the former Palace of Fine Arts from the 1893 World's Columbian Exposition, as seen from the northern edge of Jackson Park.

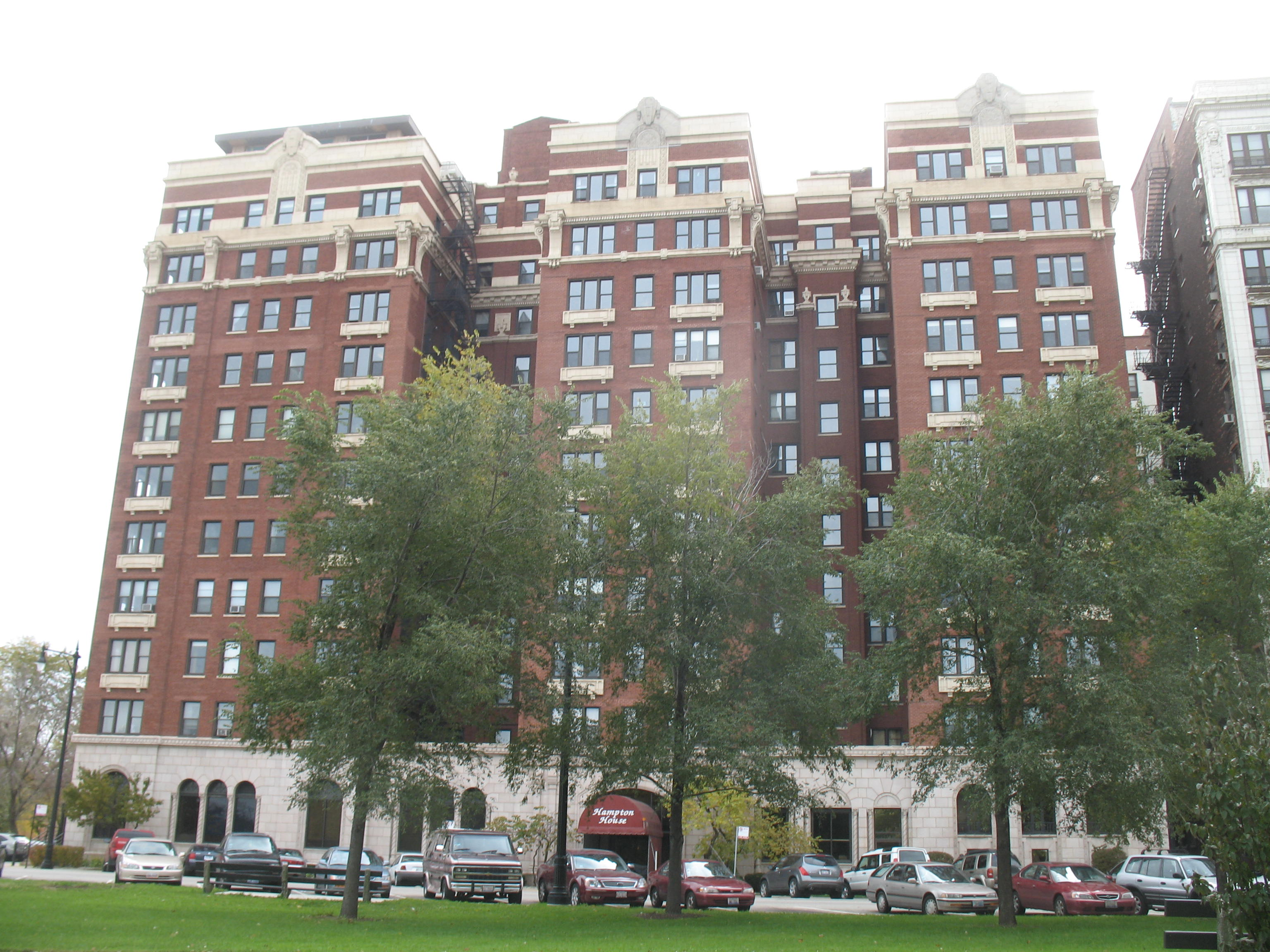
The Hampton House, a condominium located on the property that once housed the Hyde Park House (Hyde Park's first hotel). In the 1980s, the Hampton House was home to Chicago Mayor Harold Washington.

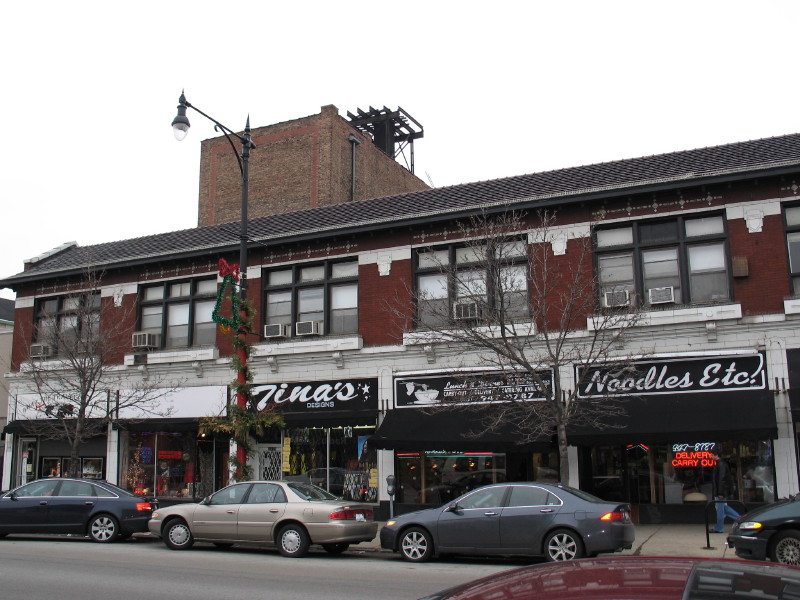
Shops and restaurants on 53rd Street.

A monument marking the location of the first kiss between Barack Obama and Michelle Obama, located on the corner of 53rd Street and Dorchester Avenue.

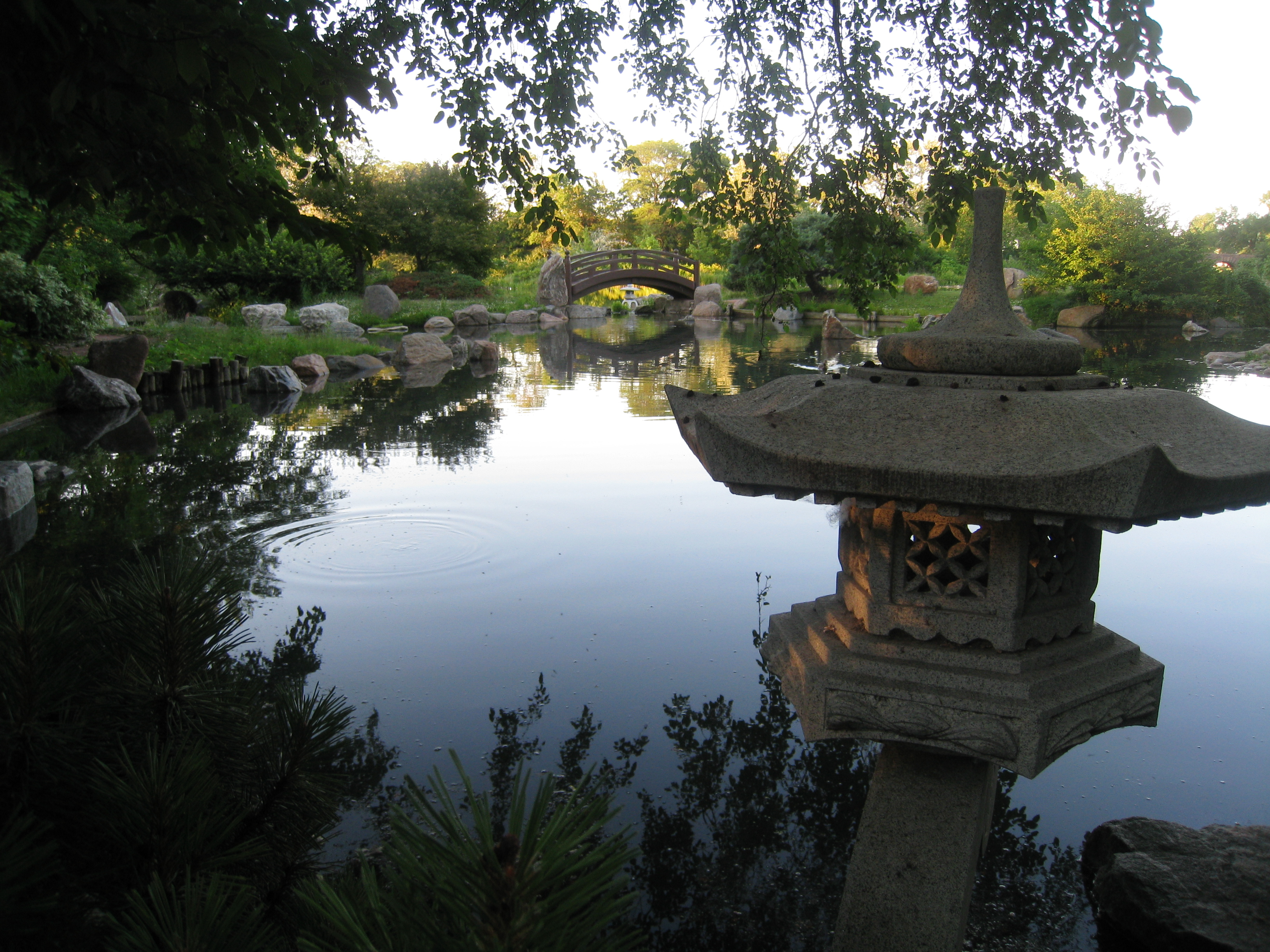
Osaka Garden, a Japanese garden in Jackson Park.

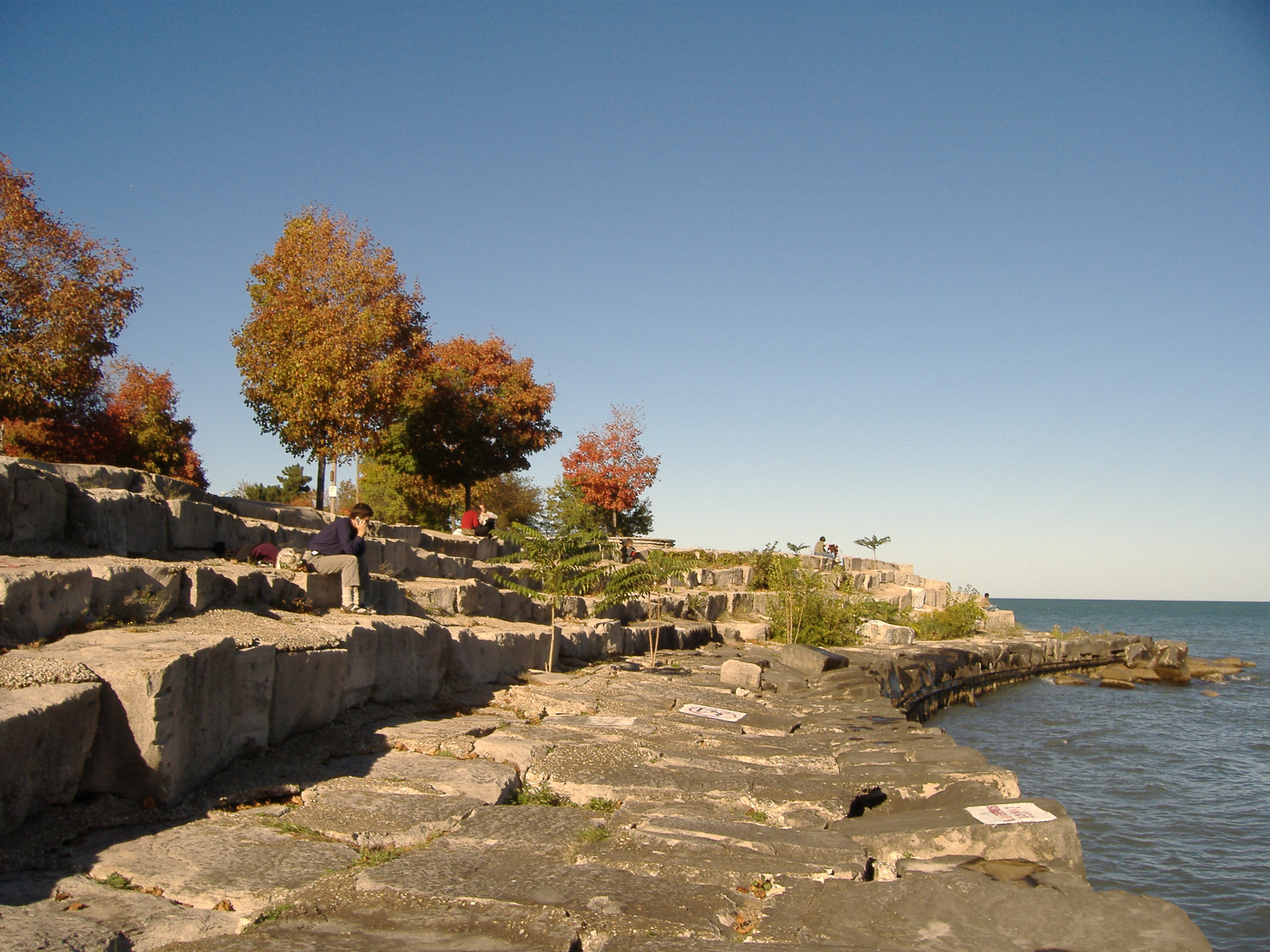
The banks of Promontory Point.

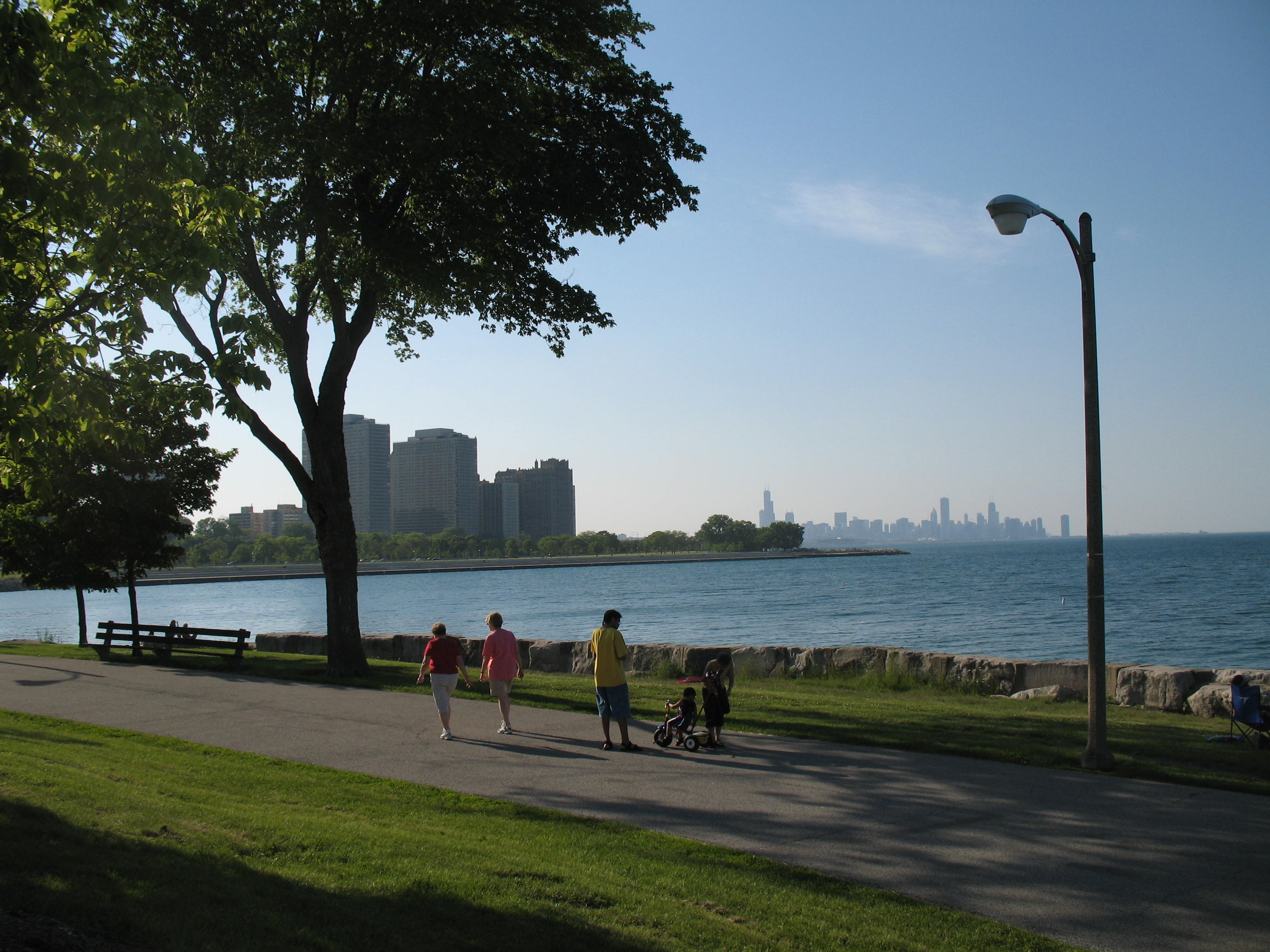
Downtown Chicago and lakefront condominiums in Hyde Park as seen from the northern side of Promontory Point.
