= Woodlawn Tap =

- Location within Chicago metropolitan area

Restaurant information
- Established: 1948
- Owner: Matt Martell
- Previous owner: Jimmy Wilson
- Food type: American
- Location: 1172 East 55th Street, Chicago, Illinois, United States
- Coordinates: 41.7948°N 87.5966°W
- Other information: Also known as "Jimmy's"

Woodlawn Tap, also known as Jimmy's, is a neighborhood bar located at 1172 East 55th Street in Hyde Park, Chicago, Illinois. Opened in 1948, the establishment is recognized for its decades of service, diverse clientele, and strong association with the University of Chicago.

The bar has long been regarded as a cultural institution, recognized as one of Chicago's essential dive bars, and has attracted a range of notable patrons including writers, performers, and academics.

== History ==
Woodlawn Tap was founded in the spring of 1948 under Jimmy Wilson, who owned the bar until his death in 1999. Though officially named "Woodlawn Tap," the bar is more commonly referred to as "Jimmy's."

The bar survived Hyde Park's urban renewal projects of the 1950s, which closed many other taverns in the area. Its survival has been linked to support from local leaders, including Father Jack Farry of St. Thomas the Apostle Catholic Church. During this decade, the bar's liquor license was temporarily revoked due to allegations of serving a minor, but it was later restored after community support.

Following Wilson’s death in 1999, ownership was assumed by brothers Jim and Bill Callahan, who reopened the bar in 2000 once they had successfully regained its liquor license. City officials initially challenged the license on zoning grounds, citing proximity to a school, but community testimony clarified that the property in question was a church parking lot rather than a school, leading to reinstatement.

In 2021, former bartender and University of Chicago alumnus "Matt Martell" became the owner.

== Layout, food, and atmosphere ==
The bar occupies a one-story brick building with a plain exterior. Inside, a mahogany bar, mirrored shelves, tin ceiling, swinging doors, and dark wood paneling have been preserved since the 1940s. Renovations by Bill and Jim Callahan after 1999 to meet code requirements left the space with much of its mid-century character intact.

Woodlawn Tap consists of three rooms: a front bar, a middle area formerly a packaged goods store, and a rear space sometimes used for performances. The Chi Bar Project notes that from 1958 to 1967 the back was reserved as a student-only 'University Room'. A small reference collection was traditionally available, with encyclopedias, Shakespeare, and anthologies kept in the back room. The collection once included a hefty atlas, later removed under uncertain circumstances.

The bar serves a rotating menu of simple American fare, including burgers and sandwiches. For decades, prices remained notably low. The bar offers a mix of domestic and imported beers, available on tap and in bottles, though Budweiser has never been carried after founder Jimmy Wilson refused to stock it during a pricing dispute.

The bar operates on a cash-only basis.

== In popular culture and notable patrons ==
Over the decades, Woodlawn Tap has attracted a broad clientele, including university affiliates, local regulars, and well-known visitors.

Notable patrons recorded in the bar’s guest book include poet Dylan Thomas (March 16, 1950), columnist Mike Royko, and journalist Jimmy Breslin. Other visitors have included novelist Saul Bellow, anthropologist Margaret Mead, comedian Bob Newhart, and Compass Players performers such as Mike Nichols, Elaine May, Del Close, and Jerry Stiller, a troupe that later became the foundation for The Second City. The University of Chicago Magazine also notes recollections from David Brooks, while the Chicago Literary Hall of Fame reports that Philip Roth and Richard Stern were among those said to have visited.

The University of Chicago recognized Wilson in 1982 with an honorary alumni title for his role in campus social life, while the Illinois legislature passed a resolution recognizing his contribution to community cohesion.

== Legacy and significance ==
Woodlawn Tap is considered a Hyde Park landmark. The 'University of Chicago Magazine described it as a longstanding presence, serving as a place for both conversation and social life.

Woodlawn Tap is one of the few surviving bars from 55th Street's once-dense tavern scene, and has been named among Chicago's essential dive bars.
