= Chicago Beach Apartments =

- U.S. National Register of Historic Places
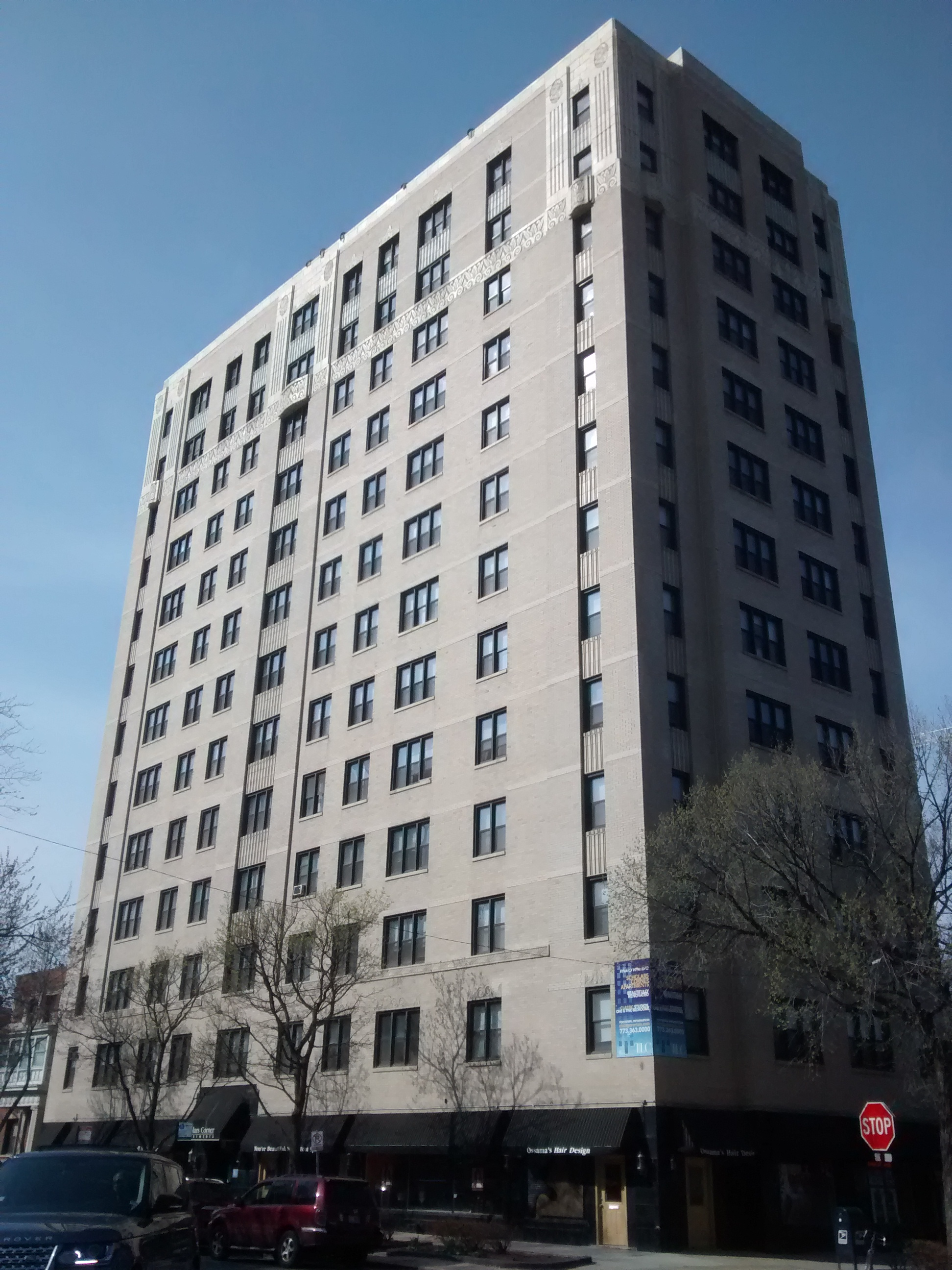
- Scholars Corner Apartments

- Location within Chicago metropolitan area Location within Illinois Location within the United States
- Location: 5100 South Cornell Avenue, Chicago, Illinois
- Coordinates: 41.8022°N 87.5868°W
- Built: 1929
- Architect: Pearson, Warner M.; Beachview Building Corp.
- Architectural style: Art Deco
- MPS: Hyde Park Apartment Hotels TR
- NRHP reference No.: 86001193
- Added to NRHP: May 14, 1986

The Chicago Beach Apartments, built in 1929, are located at 5100 South Cornell Avenue in Chicago, Illinois, US. Landfilling and other reconfiguration of the lakefront means that the building is not as close to a beach as it once was. Currently known as Scholars Corner Apartments, the building was added to the National Register of Historic Places on May 14, 1986.
