= Culture Coast Chicago =

Culture Coast Chicago is a collection of artistically vibrant neighborhoods on the South Side of Chicago, Illinois, United States. Known for its high concentration of museums, music and theater ensembles, performance venues, cultural nonprofits, and arts education opportunities, the region spans from just south of McCormick Place to the South Shore Cultural Center and is bordered by Lake Michigan to the east and the Dan Ryan Expressway to the west.

Hyde Park is the heart of the Culture Coast, with neighboring Bronzeville and Woodlawn adding to the region's diverse cultural offerings. It is home to the Museum of Science and Industry, the Western hemisphere's largest science museum, and the Hyde Park Art Center, the city's oldest alternative exhibition space.

Other key institutions include the DuSable Museum of African American History, the country's first museum dedicated to the study of African American history; and the University of Chicago, which houses the Institute for the Study of Ancient Cultures, the David and Alfred Smart Museum of Art, and the Renaissance Society. The university hosts numerous visiting artists, performances, and lectures. The region is also home to several independent bookstores and community arts initiatives.

The Culture Coast's artistic heritage includes creative icons such as playwright Lorraine Hansberry, novelist Saul Bellow, and jazz pioneer Herbie Hancock. The lakefront area has evolved into an eclectic architectural landscape since the mid-1800s, featuring Frank Lloyd Wright's Prairie-style homes, the Hyde Park-Kenwood Historic District, and the University of Chicago's Collegiate Gothic quadrangles and modern constructions, such as the Joe and Rika Mansueto Library and the Reva and David Logan Center for the Arts.

Since the 2008 election of former Kenwood resident Barack Obama as President, the Culture Coast has experienced renewed tourist interest. It is also a key focus of Chicago mayor Rahm Emanuel's 2012 Chicago Cultural Plan, which calls for increased capital infrastructure for the "Museum Campus South" area surrounding the Museum of Science and Industry and the DuSable Museum.

== History ==
=== Early development ===
In 1853, New York lawyer and businessman Paul Cornell purchased 300 acres of swampy lakefront land south of Chicago and named it Hyde Park in a nod to the London park. He secured regular rail access to and from downtown Chicago, deeding 60 acres of land to the Illinois Central Railroad in exchange for a train station at present-day 53rd Street.

In 1857, Cornell opened the upscale Hyde Park House hotel on 53rd Street and successfully marketed Hyde Park as an urban escape for affluent Chicagoans. Over the next three decades, the region experienced steady residential development.

=== World's Columbian Exposition ===
In 1893, Hyde Park and its surrounding areas were thrust into the international spotlight as hosts of the World's Columbian Exposition. Held in Jackson Park and along the Midway Plaisance, the fair drew more than 27 million attendees during its 179-day operation and paved the way for the region's enduring cultural influence.

Under the Beaux-Arts vision of urban planner Daniel H. Burnham, the exposition's director of works, and landscape architect Frederick Law Olmsted, the fair transformed the South Side. Several neoclassical buildings adorned with white paint were constructed for the fair's scientific and cultural exhibits, giving rise to the site's nickname, the White City. Among the architecture was Jackson Park's massive Palace of Fine Arts, which housed the Field Museum of Natural History (formerly the Field Columbian Museum) until 1920.

In 1933, philanthropist Julius Rosenwald, Sears, Roebuck and Company's chairman, renovated the palace to house the Museum of Science and Industry. The museum was the first in North America to feature interactive exhibits and now draws more than a million visitors to the Culture Coast every year.

=== The University of Chicago ===
Founded in 1890, the University of Chicago is a private research institution and home to several of the Culture Coast's arts and cultural organizations, including the David and Alfred Smart Museum of Art, the Oriental Institute, and the Court Theatre, which The Wall Street Journal has described as "the most consistently excellent theater company in America."

Started with an investment from philanthropist John D. Rockefeller and land donated by retailer Marshall Field, the university was described by Rockefeller as "the best investment I ever made." Between its undergraduate, graduate, professional, and continuing education schools, the university enrolls around 14,000 students each quarter and is affiliated with more than 80 Nobel laureates.

== The arts ==
=== Music, dance, and theater ===
Chicago's vibrant jazz and blues scene both have strong roots in the Culture Coast. In 1918, jazz cornet player and bandleader Joe "King" Oliver came up from New Orleans and set up shop in Bronzeville. In 1922, he recruited the 22-year-old Louis Armstrong, a younger rival from his native Louisiana, to join his King Oliver's Creole Jazz Band as second cornet. Other band members were Johnny Dodds (clarinet), Honore Dutrey (trombone), Lil Hardin (piano), Baby Dodds (drums) and Bill Johnson (double bass and banjo).

Throughout the 1920s, King Oliver's Creole Jazz Band and other musicians like Benny Goodman and Jelly Roll Morton entertained crowds at the Grand Terrace, Midway Gardens Ballroom, and other South Side venues. The post-World War II era gave rise to blues greats such as Buddy Guy, Muddy Waters, Howlin' Wolf, Little Milton, Etta James, Bo Diddley, Magic Sam, Robert Lockwood Jr., Junior Wells, and Freddie King. Eclectic jazz composer Sun Ra played with his Arkestra at the renowned Club De Lisa on Chicago's South Side.

A later blues/folk revival introduced Chicago to a new generation of musicians, including blues vocalist and harmonica player Paul Butterfield and Grammy nominee David Bromberg, a Hyde Park resident.

Today the Hyde Park Jazz Festival honors the Culture Coast's jazz heritage. Created in 2007, the annual fall event offers visitors two days of free jazz performances in museums, theaters, art galleries, and outdoor spaces throughout the Culture Coast. In 2011, Chicago named it the city's "Best Neighborhood Music Festival." The 2012 festival will feature saxophonist and "genius grant" MacArthur fellow Miguel Zenón.

The Culture Coast is also home to a diversity of classical music, gospel, and opera ensembles and organizations, including the Chicago Chorale and the University of Chicago Presents, one of Chicago's oldest concert series. Founded in 1943, the series is open to the public and has featured performers ranging from composer Igor Stravinsky to the Grammy Award-winning Pacifica Quartet.

The Culture Coast has several professional and amateur dance and theater organizations, including the Court Theatre, South Shore Opera Company, Hyde Park Community Players, Gilbert and Sullivan Opera Company, and many student performance groups at the University of Chicago. Chicago magazine has voted the Hyde Park School of Dance one of the city's top ballet training programs.

=== Visual arts ===
The Culture Coast houses several of the city's fine-arts institutions, including the David and Alfred Smart Museum and the Hyde Park Art Center. The Smart Museum's permanent collection features works from Francisco Goya, Henri Matisse, Pablo Picasso, Diego Rivera, Ansel Adams, Edgar Degas, and Mark Rothko. Recent exhibitions include Feast: Radical Hospitality in Contemporary Art, a large-scale survey of works focused on the shared meal.

The post World War II era gave birth to a group of Chicago artists, primarily painters, who became loosely known as the Chicago Imagists. They were known for an existential, figurative style that eschewed high-art tradition and often gravitated toward the surreal or grotesque. As Chicago Tribune art critic Alan G. Artner wrote, "the subjects the Chicagoans strived to express were of the everyday, ofttimes proving aggressively funky."

The early Imagists, mentored by surrealist printmaker Vera Berdich, an instructor at the School of the Art Institute of Chicago, were dubbed "The Monster Roster" and included Hyde Park Art Center exhibitions director Don Baum, Leon Golub, Nancy Spero, H.C. Westermann, and Seymour Rosofsky. In the 1960s, another group of Imagists showcased their work at the Hyde Park Art Center in series of exhibitions titled "Hairy Who," and subsequently became known by that name. The Hairy Who included Jim Nutt, Gladys Nilsson, James Falconer, Art Green, Suellen Rocca, and Karl Wirsum. Other Imagist artists who exhibited work at the Hyde Park Art Center during the 1960s and 1970s included Ed Paschke, Barbara Rossi, and Roger Brown.

A number of smaller art venues and galleries dot the Culture Coast. The Renaissance Society is an art museum on the University of Chicago campus that features contemporary art, such as the 2012 career survey of Chicago photographer Dawoud Bey.

Every summer, upwards of 250 artists and 20,000 visitors visit the Culture Coast for the 57th Street Art Fair, Chicago's oldest juried art fair.

=== Architecture ===
In the early 20th century, the Culture Coast became a focal point for Prairie-style architecture with the construction of Frank Lloyd Wright's Robie House. Characterized by horizontal lines and open floor plans, Prairie-style homes embodied Wright's philosophy that architecture should reflect its natural surroundings.

Completed in 1910 at 5757 South Woodlawn Avenue, the Robie House is considered by many to be one of the most important examples of the movement. The building was designated a U.S. National Historic Landmark in 1963 and is now a museum.

The Isidore Heller House, an 1897 construction credited as one of Wright's early Prairie-style creations, sits just north of the Robie House at 5132 South Woodlawn Avenue. It was named a U.S. National Historic Landmark in 2004.

Architect Howard Van Doren Shaw built several constructions in the Hyde Park and Kenwood neighborhoods during the late 19th and early 20th centuries, including more than 20 private residences, University Church (5655 South University Avenue), and the Quadrangle Club at 1155 East 57th Street.

In more recent years, the University of Chicago campus has been recognized for architectural innovation and distinction. Its Joe and Rika Mansueto Library, designed by Helmut Jahn, won the American Institute of Architects' Chicago chapter Distinguished Building Citation of Merit and the Chicago Architecture Foundation's 2011 Patron of the Year Award.

The university's Midway Crossings project, a series of 50-foot tall light masses along campus pedestrian walkways, received a 2012 Honor Award for Excellence in Landscape Architecture from the Society for College and University Planning.

The university's recently constructed Reva and David Logan Center for the Arts at 915 E. 60th Street includes classrooms, studios, an art gallery, and multiple performance spaces for productions open to the general public. Architects Tod Williams and Billie Tsien have described the 184,000-square-foot space as a "mixing bowl" for artistic disciplines. It officially opens Fall 2012.

=== Literature ===
Over the past century, the Culture Coast has inspired several writers who visited or lived in its neighborhoods. Well-known literary depictions of the South Side include novelist Theodore Dreiser's Sister Carrie (1900) and Upton Sinclair's gritty The Jungle (1906).

In the 1930s, South Side native James T. Farrell portrayed the area in his Studs Lonigan trilogy, which was named 29th on the Modern Library's list of 100 best English-language novels of the 20th century. Author Richard Wright set his influential work, Native Son, in and around 1930s Hyde Park and Kenwood.

Poet and activist Langston Hughes lived on the South Side and wrote for prominent African American newspaper, the Chicago Defender before moving to New York and becoming a key figure in the Harlem Renaissance.

The post-World War II years brought poet Gwendolyn Brooks to the Culture Coast, where she wrote her collection Annie Allen, the first work by an African American to win a Pulitzer Prize. Dramatist Lorraine Hansberry later made history as the first black woman produced on Broadway with the 1959 debut of her play Raisin in the Sun, a fictionalized account of her family's experience of trying to move into a white neighborhood in Woodlawn.

Pulitzer and Nobel Prize-winning novelist Saul Bellow taught at the University of Chicago for many years and set much of his best-known works, including The Adventures of Augie March (1953), Herzog (1964), and Humboldt's Gift (1975), around the South Side.

Today local organizations such as the Neighborhood Writing Alliance, which publishes the award-winning Journal of Ordinary Thought, provide writing opportunities to Chicago residents.

Even as major chain booksellers like Borders have gone out of business, the Culture Coast remains home to several thriving independent bookstores. They include the Seminary Co-op near the University of Chicago campus, which offers the country's largest selection of academic volumes.

=== Arts education and accessibility ===
Culture Coast artists and nonprofit institutions have long used the arts as a mobilizing force for community revitalization on the South Side. North Kenwood's Little Black Pearl Art & Design Center, for example, provides arts and entrepreneurial training to local youth and adults and opened Options Laboratory Arts & Technology Charter School in 2011.

Since 1999, the Experimental Station in Woodlawn has housed cultural activities, exhibitions, lectures, and small businesses in an effort to create a thriving center of "locally-controlled cultural production". More recently, cultural planner Theaster Gates has brought the arts to historically neglected neighborhoods on the South Side with his Dorchester Project, a set of abandoned houses turned cultural incubator.

"My art practice makes room for the possibility for redevelopment," Gates, the director of the University of Chicago's Arts and Public Life initiative, said at the 2012 Aspen Ideas Festival. "People everywhere deserve the right to experience culture and experience it locally in their neighborhoods, no matter where those neighborhoods are."

In 2010, the Art Here Art Now initiative brought public art to 53rd Street as artists set up window installations and studios in neighborhood storefronts. Exhibitions included multimedia presentations with fabrics, metals, glasswork, and photography.

== Notable people ==
Several major literary, music, and artistic figures have lived or worked in the Culture Coast. They include:

Jelly Roll Morton	Joe "King" Oliver	Louis Armstrong
Benny Goodman	Johnny Dodds	Honore Dutrey
Lil Hardin	Baby Dodds	Bill Johnson
Buddy Guy	Muddy Waters	Howlin' Wolf
Little Milton	Etta James	Bo Diddley
Magic Sam	Robert Lockwood Jr.	Freddie King
Paul Butterfield	David Bromberg	Theodore Dreiser
James T. Farrell	Richard Wright	Gwendolyn Brooks
Lorraine Hansberry	Langston Hughes	Nelson Algren
Studs Terkel	Saul Bellow	Don Baum
Leon Golub	Nancy Spero	H.C. Westermann
Seymour Rosofsky	Jim Nutt	Gladys Nilsson
Art Green	James Falconer	Suellen Rocca
Karl Wirsum	Barbara Rossi	Roger Brown
Ed Paschke	Sun Ra	Herbie Hancock
Allan Bloom	Philip Glass	Philip Roth
Bernard Sahlins	Paul Sills	Mike Nichols
Sara Paretsky	Mark Strand	J. M. Coetzee
David Auburn	Theaster Gates

== Transportation ==
The Culture Coast is located roughly seven miles south of downtown Chicago and accessible by Lake Shore Drive and several forms of public transportation. The 18-mile Chicago Lakefront Trail runs along the lakefront and through Jackson Park, making it a frequent route for bikers exploring the coast.
