= Hampton House (Chicago) =

Condominium building in Chicago, Illinois

Coordinates: 41.799503°N 87.582772°W

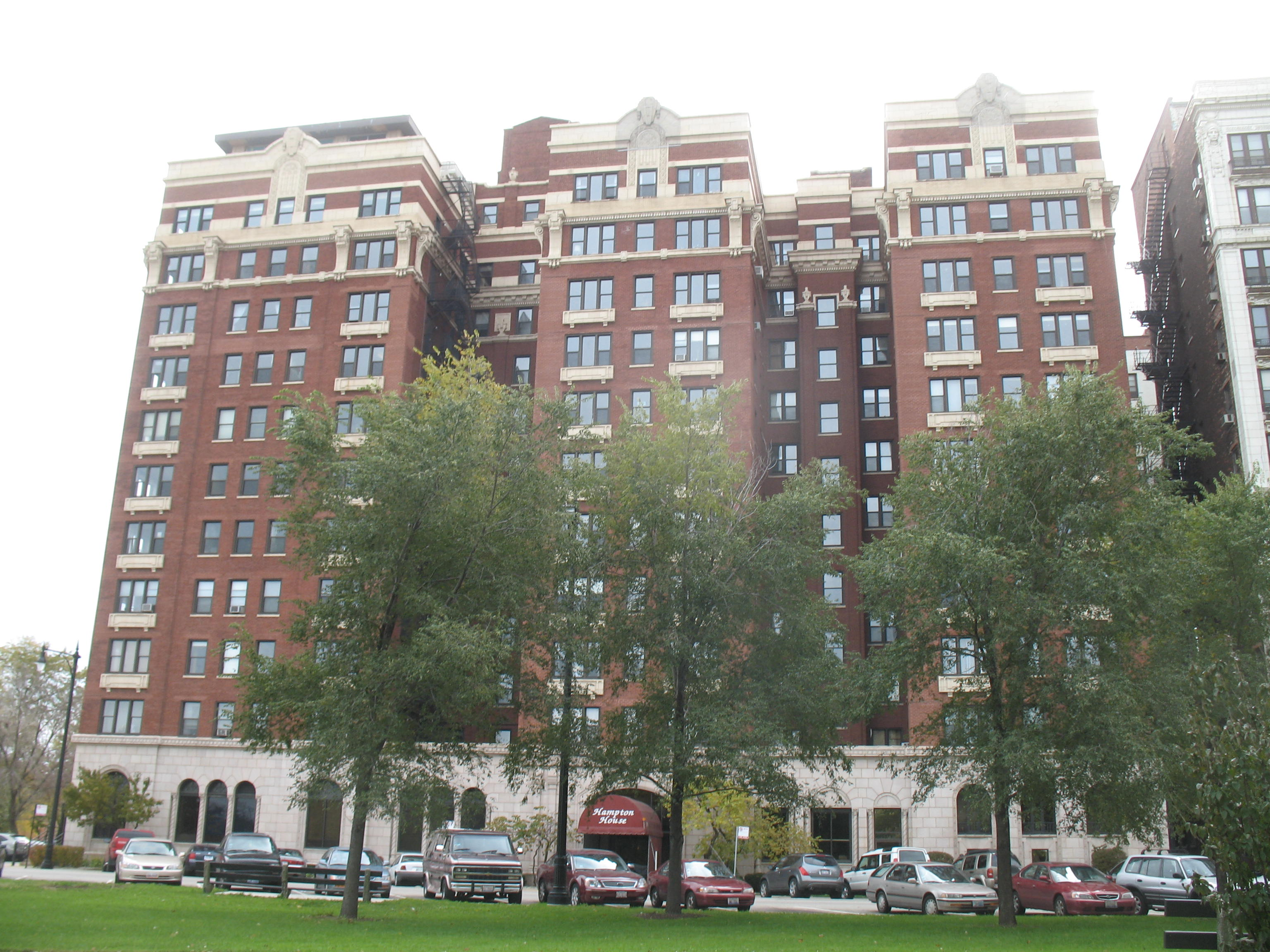
- (October 2006)
- Interactive map of the Hampton House area

General information
- Status: Completed
- Architectural style: beaux-arts/historism
- Location: 5300 South Shore Drive
- Construction started: 1917
- Completed: 1918

Height
- Height: 155.35 ft

Technical details
- Floor count: 12

Design and construction
- Architects: Newhouse & Bernham

The Hampton House is a residential condominium located in the Hyde Park neighborhood of Chicago, Illinois on the property that once housed the Hyde Park House, a hotel built by Hyde Park founder Paul Cornell in the 1850s. The property was originally named the Sisson Hotel when constructed in 1918.

== Mid 19th century ==
Cornell's Stone

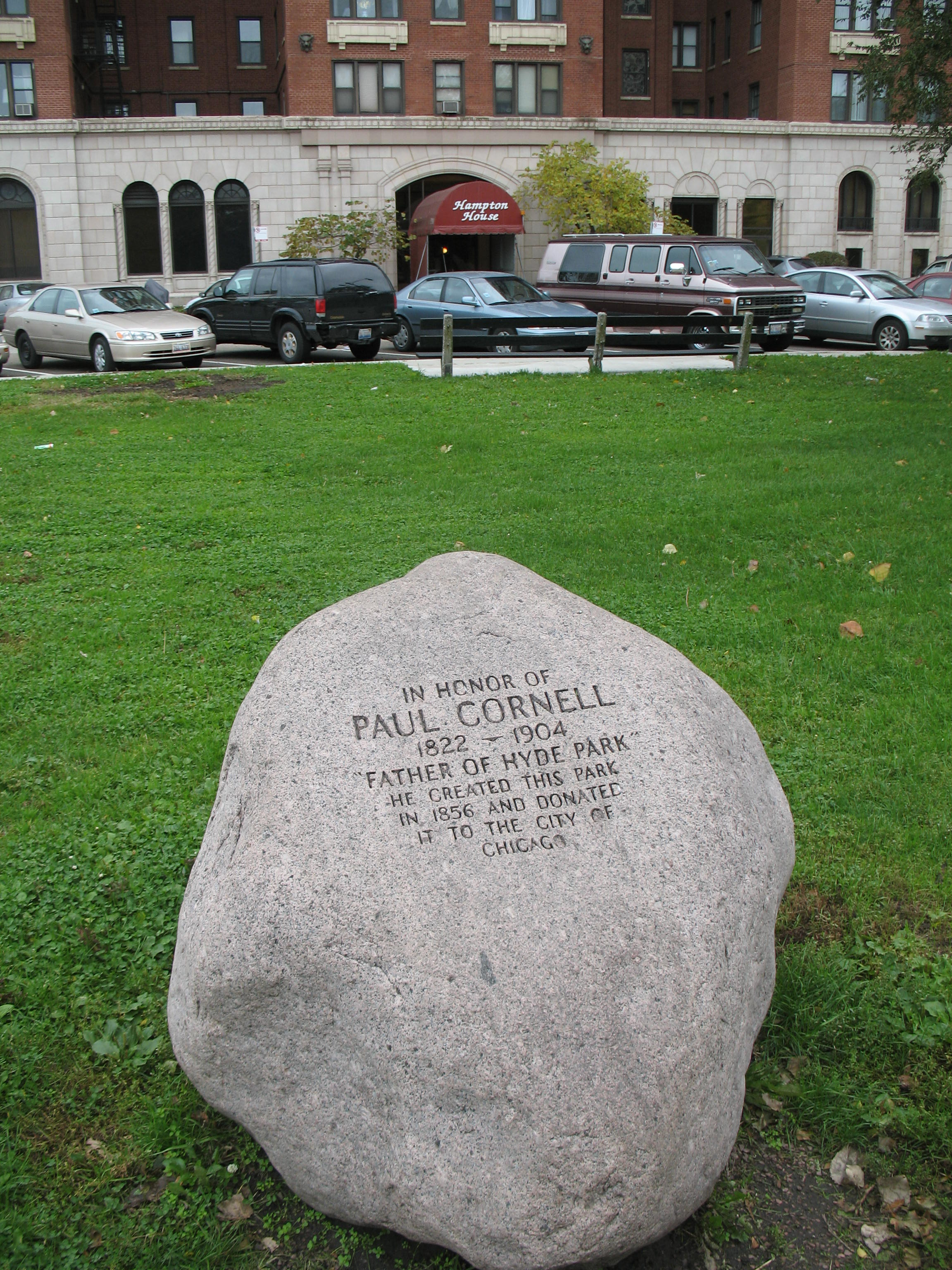
Paul Cornell's Stone in front of the Hampton House

Cornell, a successful lawyer, businessman and real estate speculator, purchased 300 acres (1.2 km^{2}) of Lake Michigan lakefront land between 51st and 55th Streets in Hyde Park Township (six miles south of downtown Chicago). The land was also adjacent to the Illinois Central Railroad. Cornell employed a common speculation strategy of the day by developing near rail depots. Cornell took the extra step of lobbying for the placement of a local railroad passenger station that opened in 1856. He parceled small plots and dedicated a small lakefront park that is further discussed below. He constructed a hotel, The Hyde Park House, in the 1850s near the planned rail depot in order to introduce travelers to a new suburb that provided escapes from the cities. This became an especially successful speculation strategy as an escape from the blight and devastation of the Great Chicago Fire that was to come 1871.

The 4 story Hyde Park House was a popular summer respite for a clientele who had the time and money for extended stays. The recently widowed Mary Todd Lincoln even stayed there with her sons. It also served as host to Prince of Wales, Albert Edward during his 1860 visit to Chicago. It served as the focal point of Hyde Park social life. However, little white collar work took place in these suburbs at the time. Nonetheless such commerce formed an economy of its own by employing service workers and attracting the cashflow of guests. Within 10 years of its initial development the town population grew past 1000 residents including numerous former guests of the hotel. The hotel burned down in 1879.

== Early 20th century ==
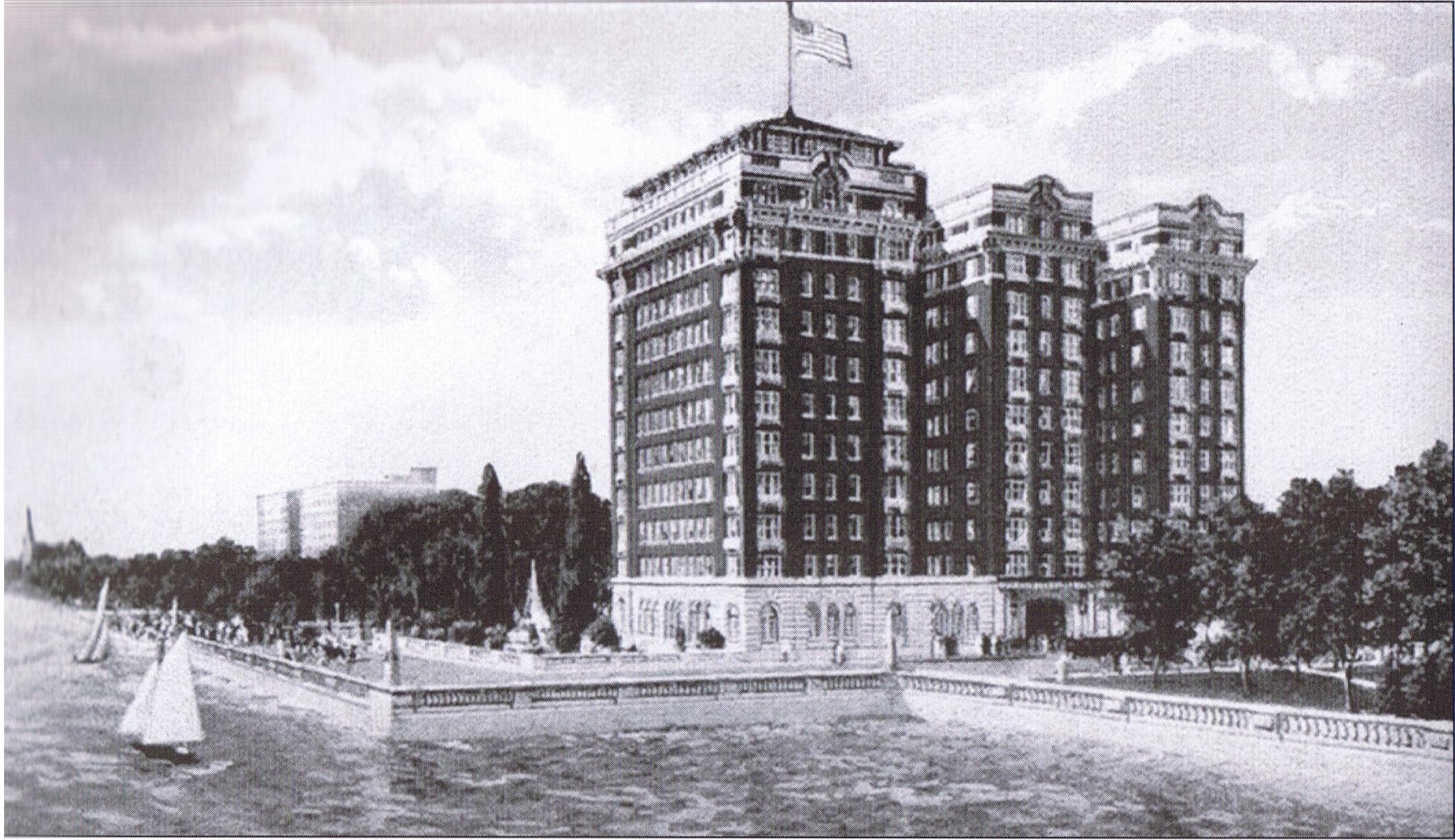
Sisson Hotel from Lake Michigan

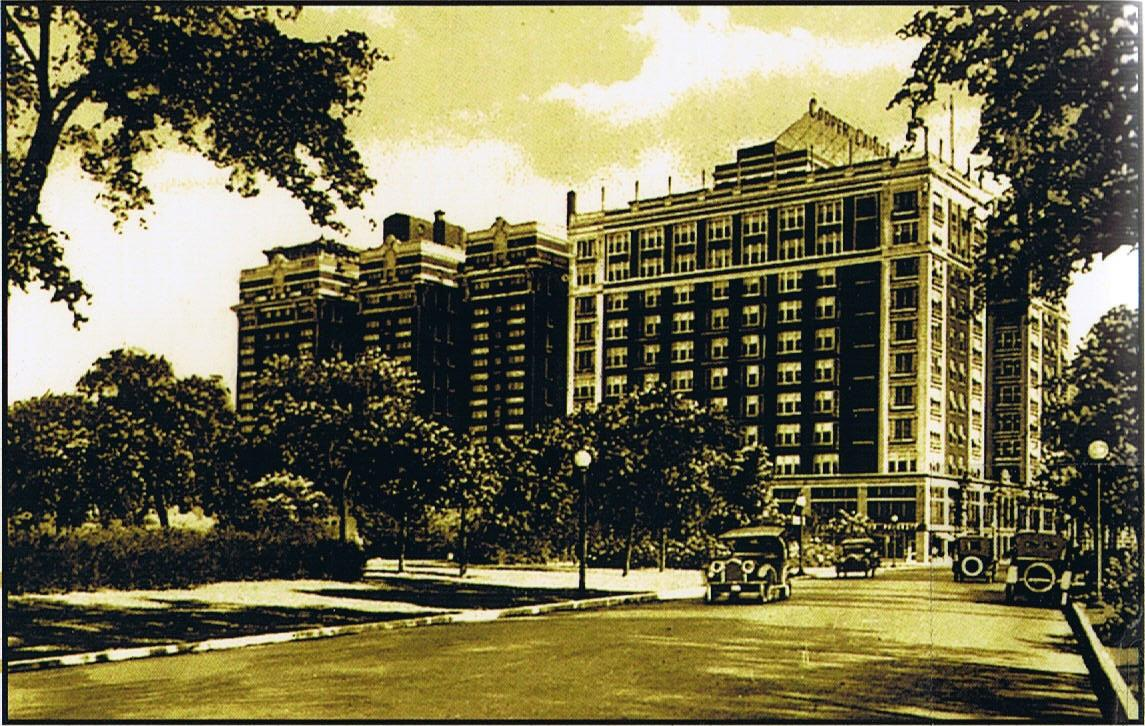
Sisson Hotel (l.) and Cooper-Carlton (r.) from S. Hyde Park Boulevard

The Sisson Hotel, was constructed in 1918 on the site of Paul Cornell’s first Hyde Park House hotel opened in 1857, which had been destroyed by fire in 1879 at Lake Michigan and 53rd Street. It is credited as the first high rise on the South Side of Chicago excluding buildings associated with the World's Columbian Exposition. It was constructed adjacent to Lake Michigan before the landfill projects that moved the shoreline eastward and eventually cleared the way for the construction of Lake Shore Drive. In 1923, proprietor Harry W. Sisson was linked to the Ku Klux Klan by the American Unity League, which resulted in a boycott by Catholics and Jews. The reaction was a movement to urge Klansmen to stay at the hotel.

== Mid 20th century ==
The Sisson was later renamed Hotel Sherry. During the Big band era, Hotel Sherry hosted Duke Ellington and Jewish weddings. As the Sisson and Hotel Sherry it was a popular lakefront host to American League opponents of the Chicago White Sox. By the 1970s the Hotel Sherry became the Sherry Apartments.

== Recent history ==
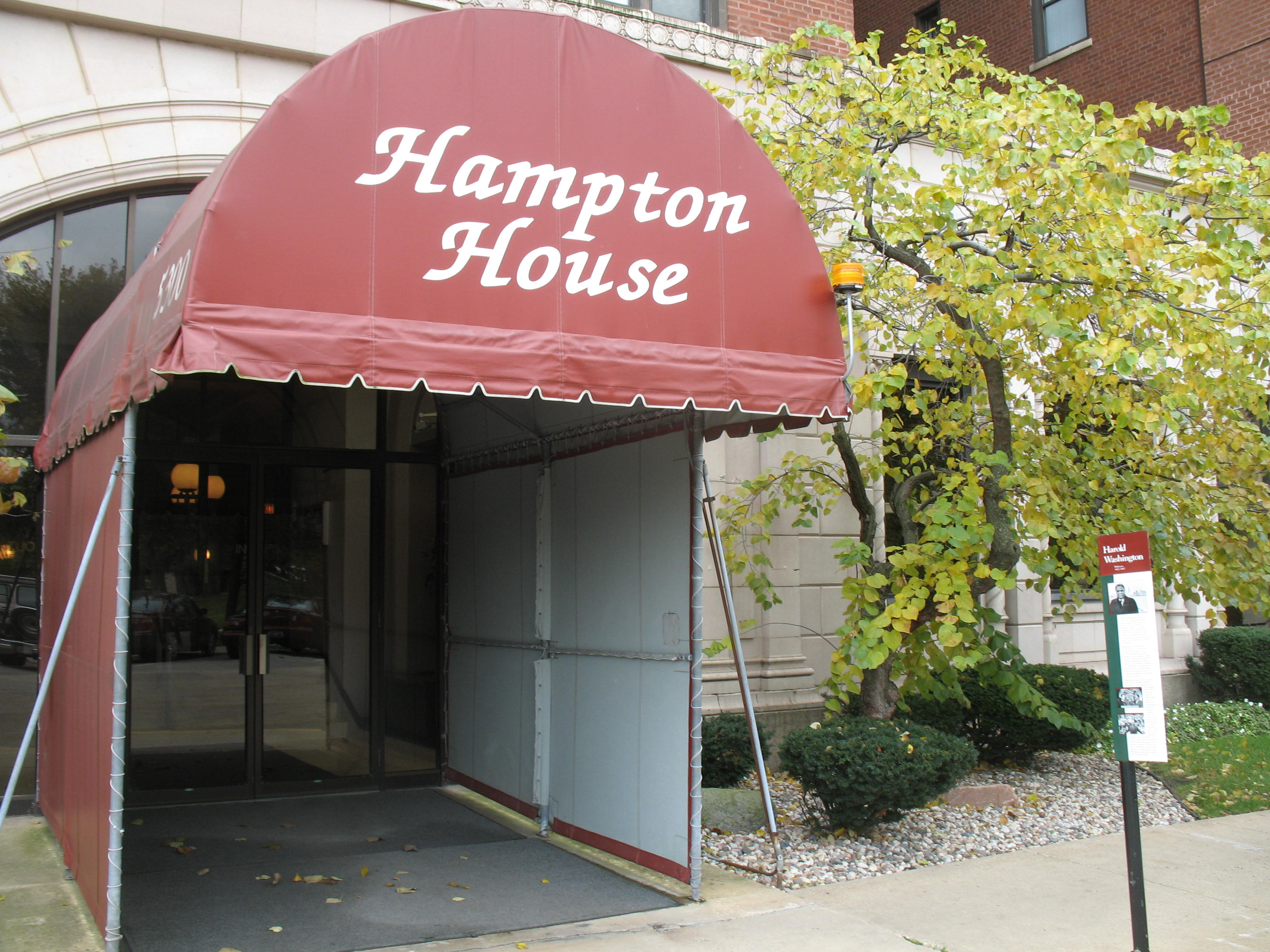
Hampton House Entrance, October 2006

In 1979, the building was converted to the Hampton House Condominium. Harold Washington resided there while he served as an Illinois Congressman and later as the first African-American Mayor of Chicago. It is a brick exterior building with a basement, a mixed use ground floor and 11 completely residential floors. The building's street address was 1725 E. 53rd Street at one time according to City of Chicago tax records. The building's address became 5300 S. South Shore Drive before its conversion to a condominium in 1979. Many large buildings in this region of Hyde Park were converted from hotels to condominiums in the later part of the 20th century, which has left the entire south side of Chicago devoid of high class hotel accommodations. However, this is changing with the Hyatt Place hotel and mixed-use development at 53rd Street and Lake Park Avenue, two blocks to the west.

== Additional photos ==
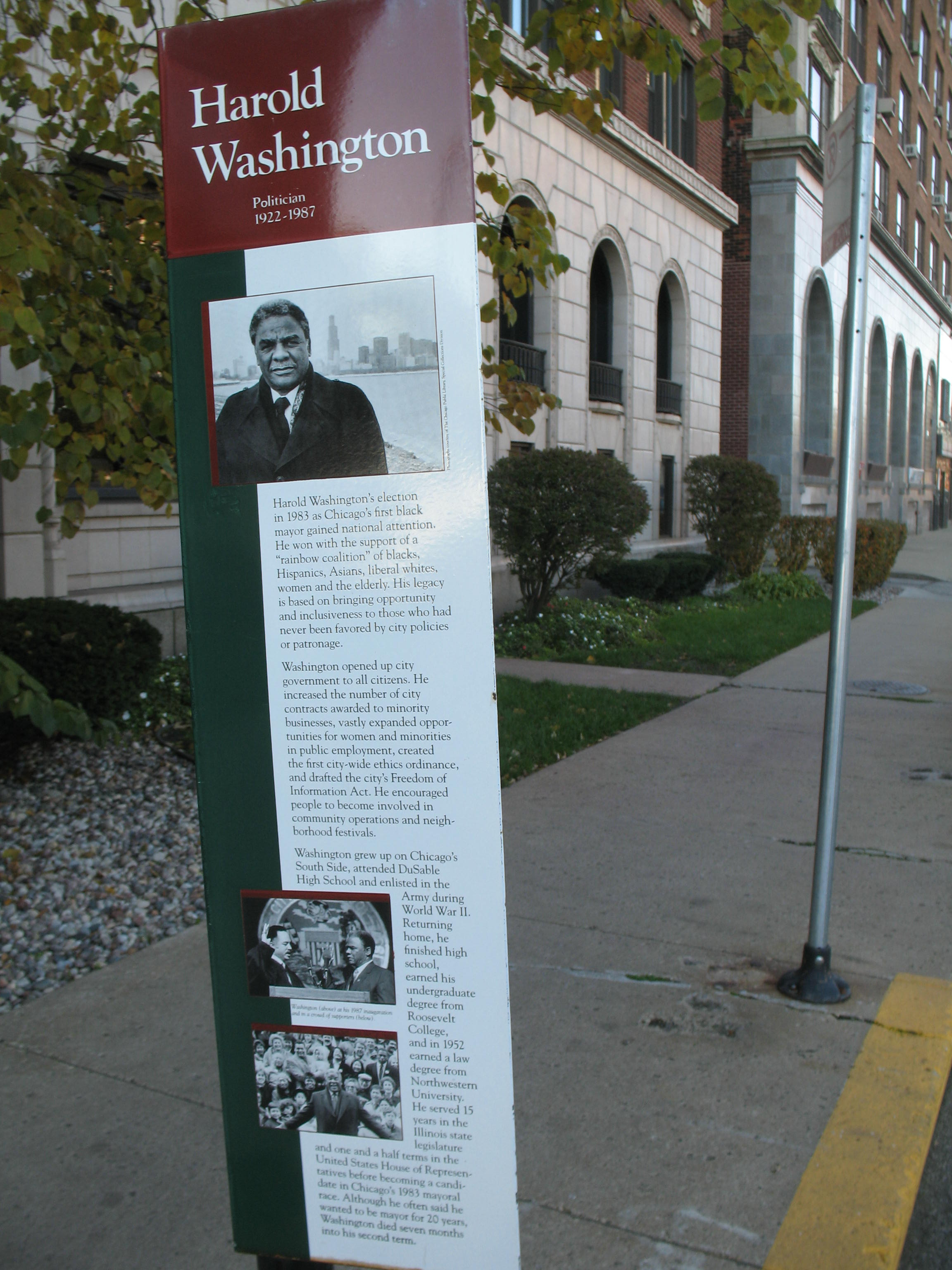
Hampton House Harold Washington Marker (front)

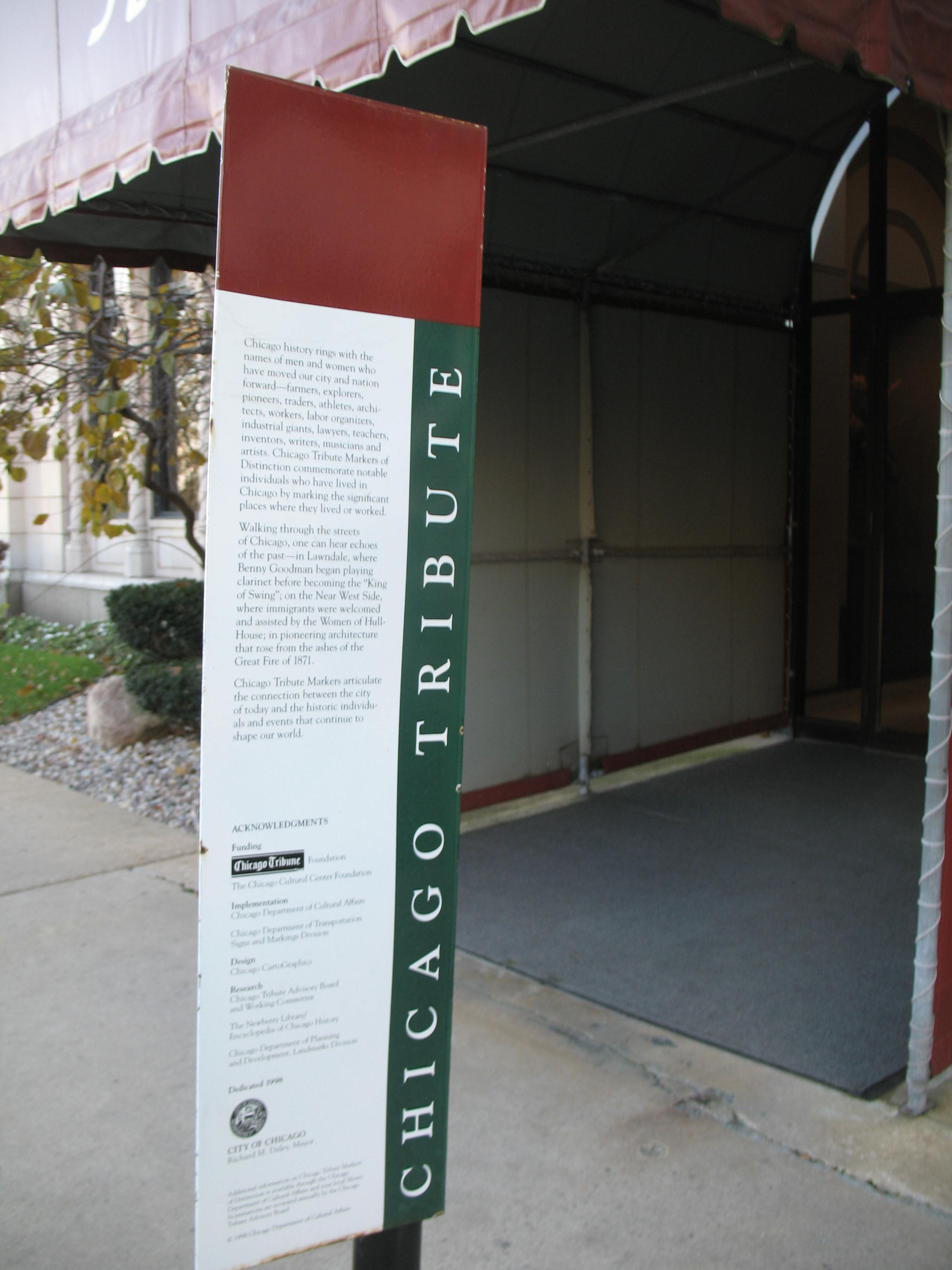
Hampton House Harold Washington Marker (back)

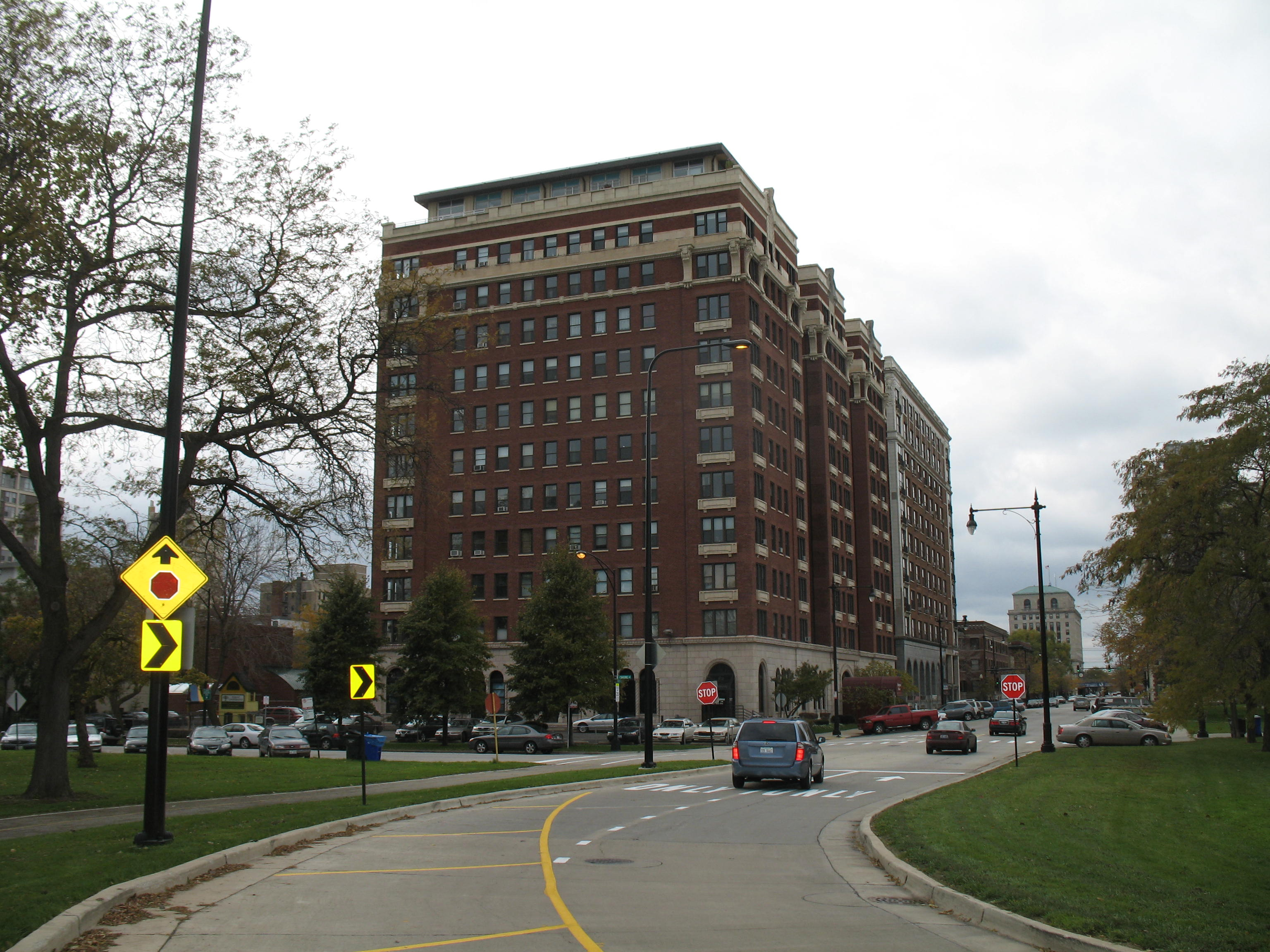
Hampton House from Lake Shore Drive 53rd Street Exit

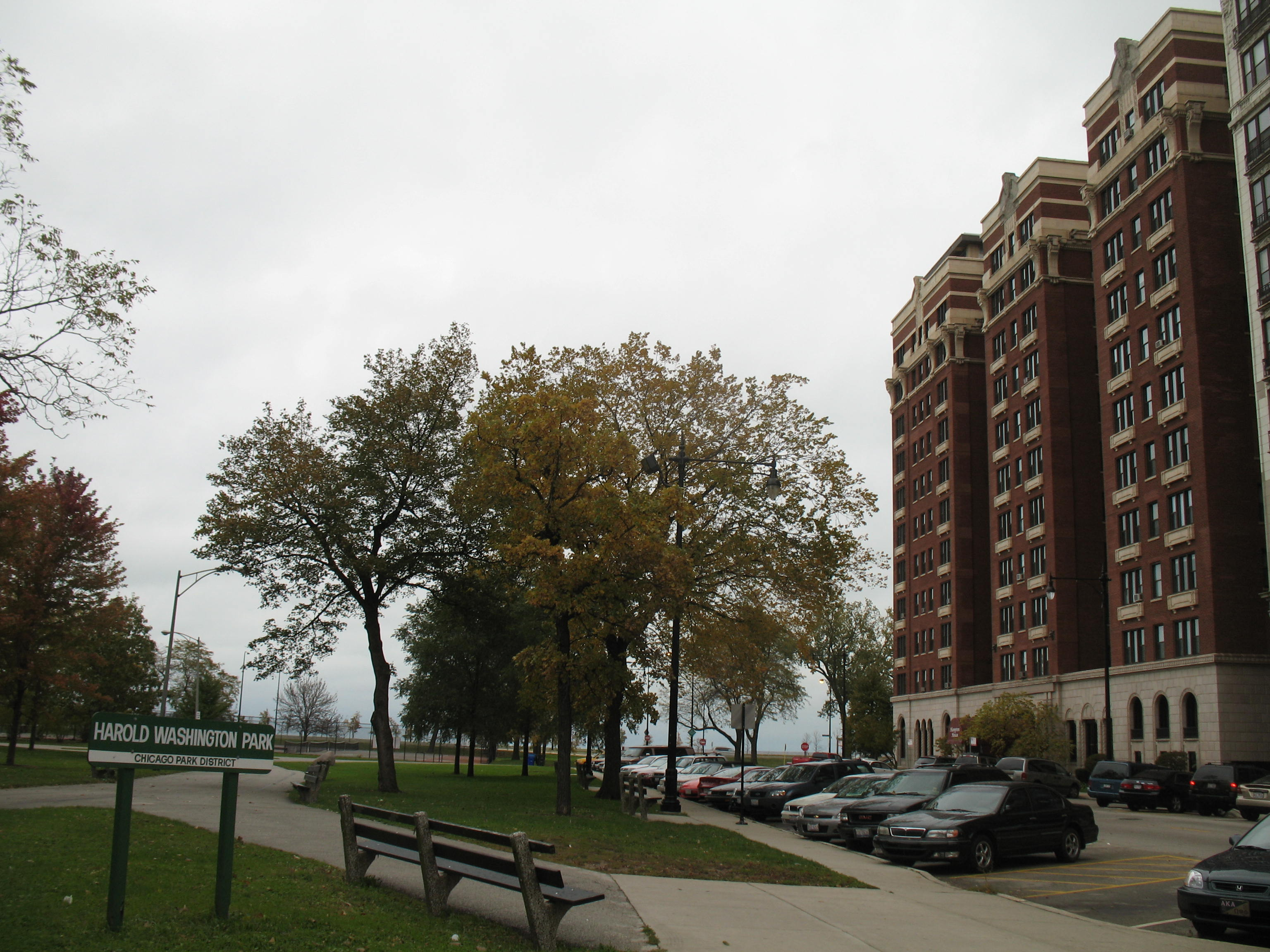
Hampton House and south end of Harold Washington Park

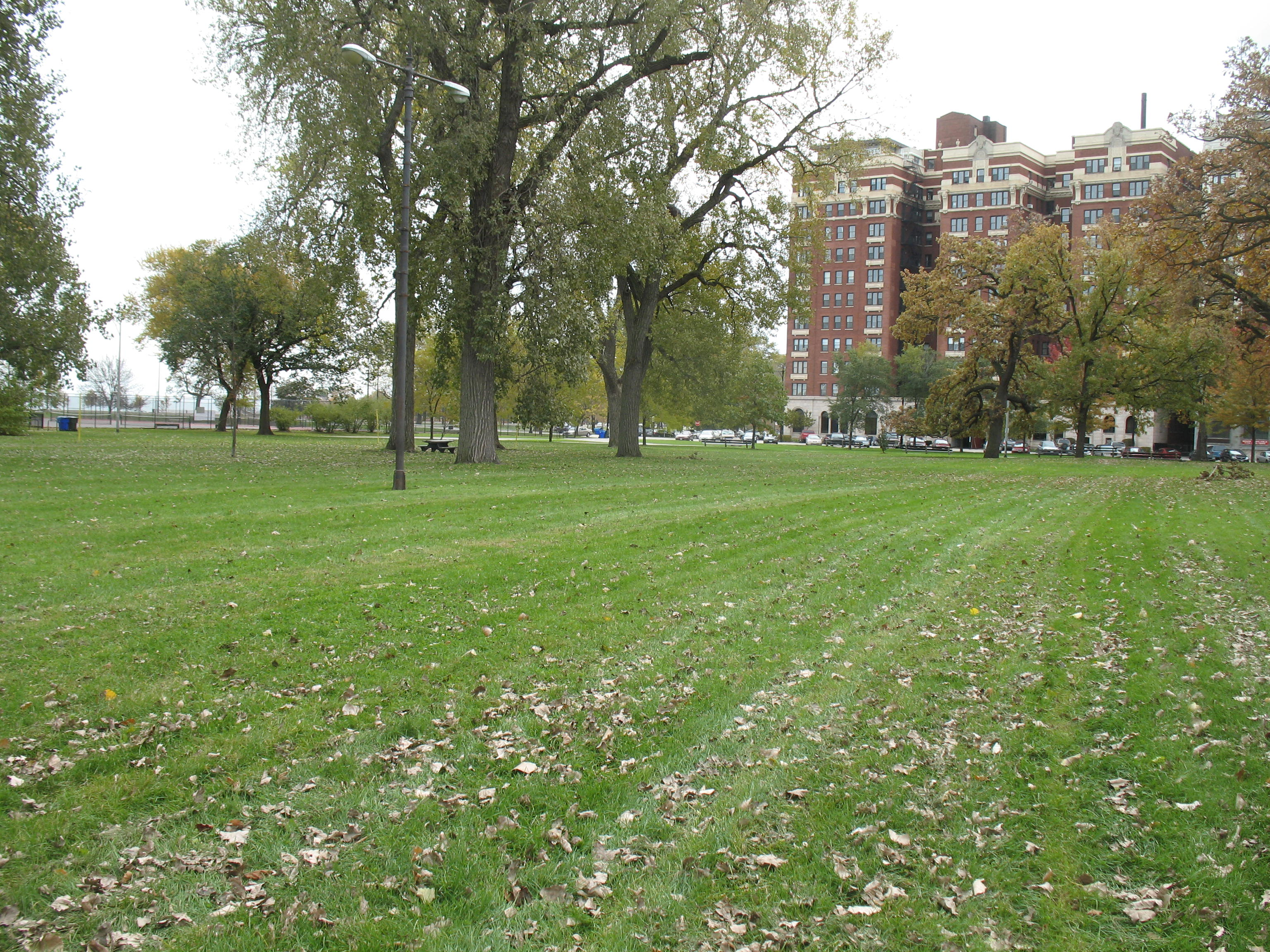
Hampton House from center of Harold Washington Park
