= Chicago Cultural Plan =

The Chicago Cultural Plan is a series of documents intended to identify the city's needs in the cultural sphere, and make proposals for organised development. The 2012 Chicago Cultural Plan will be the centerpiece to continue to elevate Chicago as a global destination for creativity, innovation and excellence in the arts.

== History ==
=== 1986 ===
The original cultural plan for Chicago was developed in 1986. under Mayor Harold Washington It was the result of a two-year, citywide effort to analyze the city's cultural needs and opportunities and to formulate recommendations for action.

=== 1995 ===
The next major event was in 1995, when the City of Chicago and cultural community members came together once again to revisit the plan, this time with more focus on international programs.

=== 2012 ===
"In one of his first acts as Mayor of Chicago, Rahm Emanuel has directed the Department of Cultural Affairs and Special Events to revisit the Chicago Cultural Plan." As of January 2012, the Department of Cultural Affairs and Special Events (DCASE) launched the Chicago Cultural Plan 2012 to identify opportunities for arts and cultural growth for the city. Similar to the 1986 cultural planning process, which involved Chicago citizens as well as cultural, civic and community groups, through citywide community-based planning meetings, the Chicago Cultural Plan 2012 also sought input from various stakeholders and Chicago residents throughout its 50 wards.

Many of the identified topics and issues from the 1986 plan were reviewed for their current relevancy, including:

- Cultural Policy in City Government
- Citywide Communications and Cooperation
- Facilities
- Technical and Financial Resources
- Arts and Education
- Paying for the Plan - Revenue Options
- International Programs (Addressed in the 1995 revisit)

Released in October 2012, the Chicago Cultural Plan created a framework to guide the city's future cultural and economic growth.

=== 2013 ===
The Department of Cultural Affairs and Special Events (DCASE) has identified four areas of focus for implementation of the Chicago Cultural Plan during 2013: Arts Education, Creative Industries, Cultural Districts and Tourism. As of January 31, roughly 20 percent of the 241 initiatives in the Cultural Plan were done or nearly done. An additional 46 percent are near-term items anticipated to be completed by the end of 2013. If you are working to address one of the initiatives included in the Cultural Plan, DCASE would like to know about it: visit www.chicagoculturalplan.org and click on "Submit a Related Activity."
