= Paul Cornell (lawyer) =

American lawyer; Investor

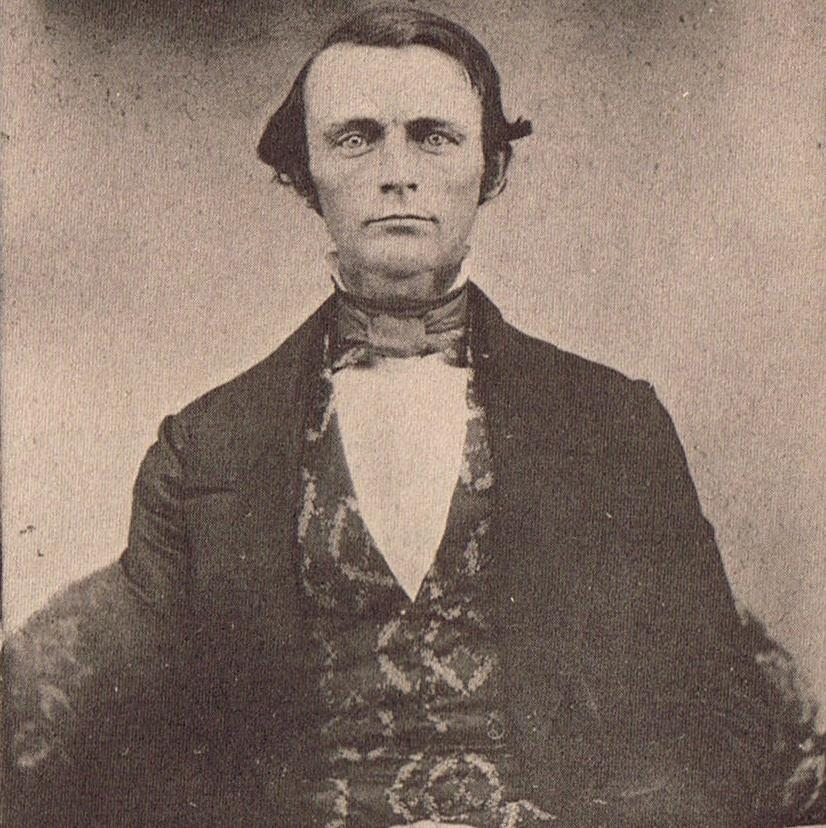
- Born: August 5, 1822; White Creek, New York
- Died: March 3, 1904 (aged 81); Chicago, Illinois
- Burial place: Oak Woods Cemetery
- Occupation: Lawyer/real estate speculator

Paul Cornell (August 5, 1822 – March 3, 1904) was an American lawyer and Chicago real estate speculator who founded the Hyde Park Township that included most of what are now known as the south and far southeast sides of Chicago in Cook County, Illinois, United States. He turned the south side Lake Michigan lakefront area, especially the Hyde Park community area and neighboring Kenwood and Woodlawn neighborhoods, into a resort community that had its heyday from the 1850s through the early 20th century. He was also an urban planner who paved the way for and preserved many of the parks that are now in the Chicago Park District. Additionally, he was a successful entrepreneur with interests in manufacturing, cemeteries, and hotels.

His modern legacy includes several large parks now in the Chicago Park District: Jackson Park, Washington Park, Midway Plaisance and Harold Washington Park. Most of the South and Southeast Sides of Chicago were developed and eventually annexed into the City of Chicago as a result of his foresight. A lengthy street and a park both bear his name.

== Background ==
Born in Upstate New York, Cornell was from a distinguished New England family, was descendant from Thomas Cornell, the progenitor of the Cornell family in North America, and a cousin to Ezra Cornell, founder of Cornell University. When his father died (he was 10 months old at that time) the family moved to the Adams County, IL/Schuyler County, IL area, where he worked as a farmhand to pay for schooling. He passed the Illinois bar examination and moved to Chicago in 1847. Unfortunately, his entire savings was stolen from his hotel room on his first night in town. A sympathetic lawyer provided him with both a loan and a job at the law office of Skinner and Hoyne, where he met Senator Stephen Douglas.

He was married to the sister-in-law of John Evans, after whom Evanston, IL was named. He had many strong local connections, being related to founders of Northwestern University (Evans and Orrington Lunt) and to George Kimbark of Riverside Improvement Company. His brother-in-law Kimbark purchased the area between 51st and 55th and Dorchester and Woodlawn to the west of Cornell's purchase. Cornell later purchased this as well as other lands purchased by his uncle, Hassan A. Hopkins, to add to Hyde Park.

== Hyde Park ==
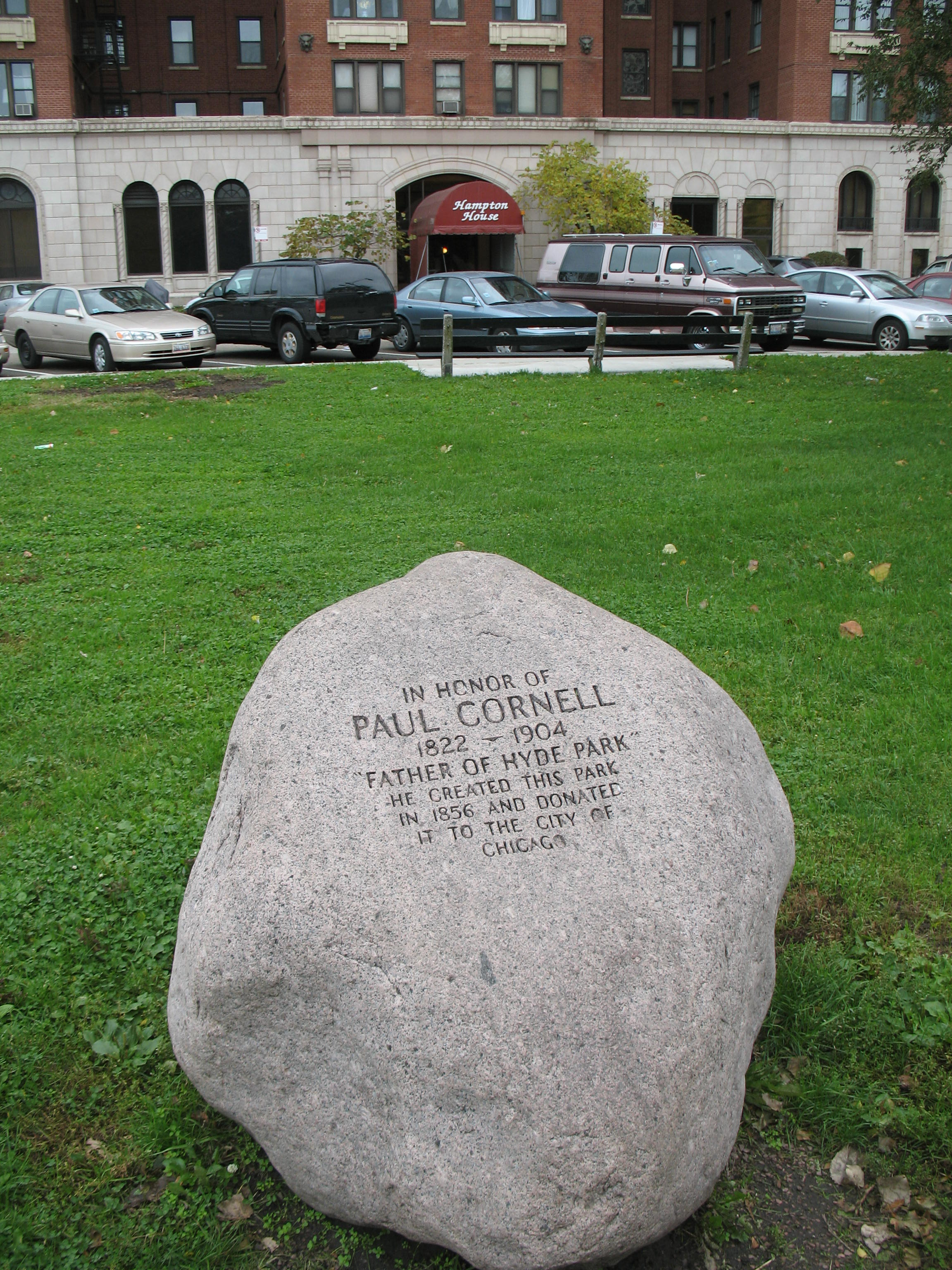
Paul Cornell's Stone in front of the Hampton House

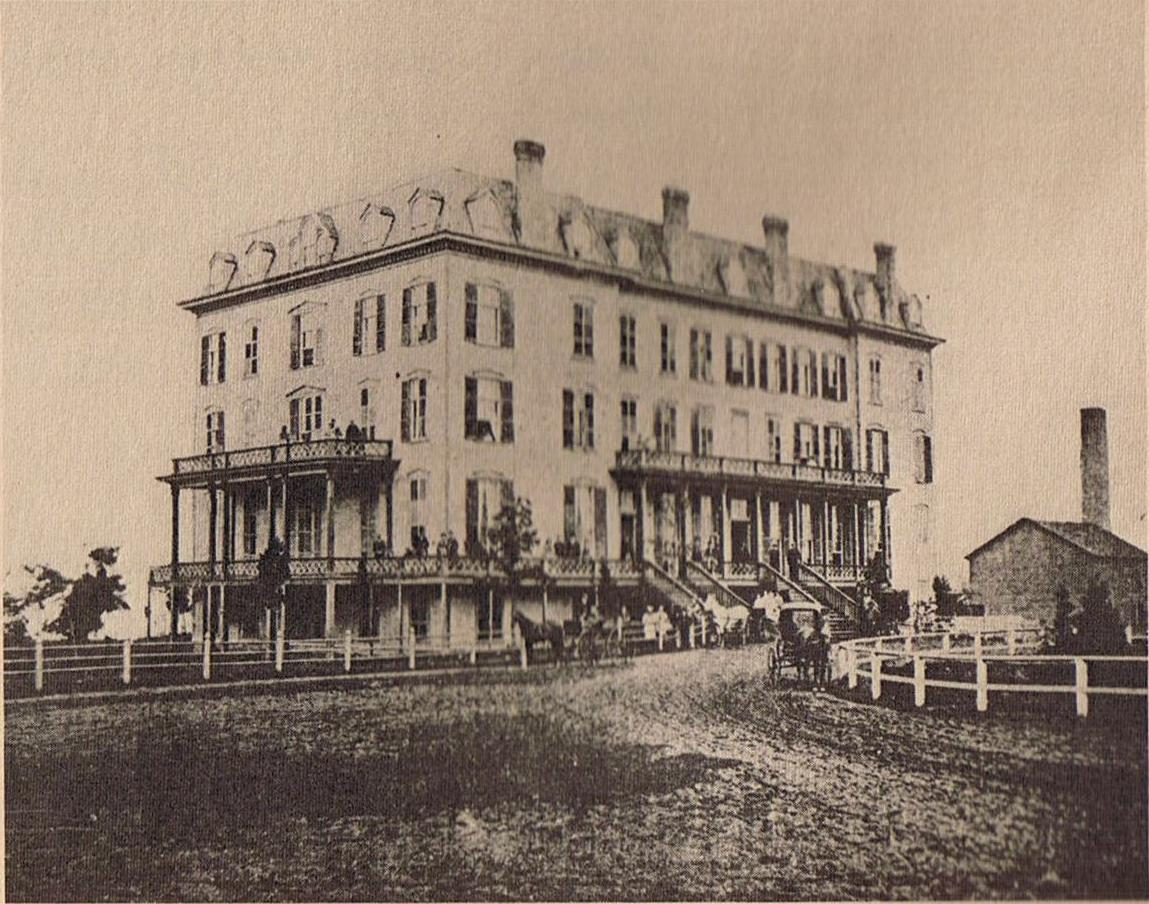
Cornell's Hyde Park House at 53rd Street & Lake Michigan

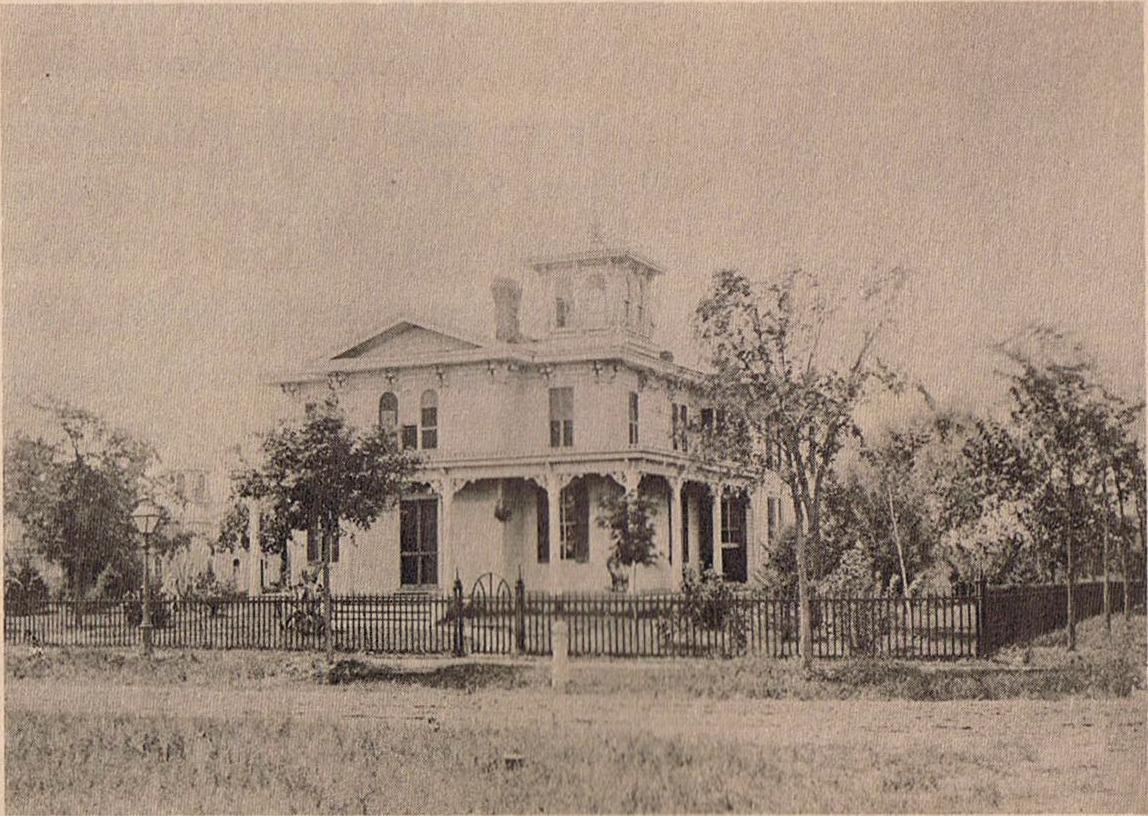
Paul Cornell's Estate at the current corner of 51st Street (East Hyde Park Boulevard) and Harper

Douglas advised him to consider investing in land south of the city limits. After some horseback travels through the area, he began to envision a viable community there. In 1853, following the advice of Douglas, he bought 300 acres (1.21 km^{2}) of property between 51st Street and 55th Street as a speculative investment. This area was 7 miles (11.27 km) south of the mouth of the Chicago River and 6 miles (9.66 km) south of downtown Chicago. In the 1850s, Chicago was still a walkable urban area well contained within a 2 miles (3.22 km) radius of the center. It was common for development companies to locate hotels near rail depots to introduce visitors to new suburbs. In 1856, Paul Cornell invented the Chicago railroad suburb. In an effort to improve his land value, he deeded 60 acres (0.24 km^{2}) to the Illinois Central Railroad in exchange for a 53rd Street train station and a commitment of 6 daily connections to Chicago's Central Depot in each direction. He then marketed the neighborhood to wealthy Chicagoans as a resort area. He selected the name Hyde Park to associate the area with the elite high class neighborhoods of New York and London.

At about the same time, he built the Hyde Park House a 4-story hotel at 53rd Street and Lake Michigan. The hotel became the focal point of the community and drew affluent guests with leisure time and discretionary income. This site is now occupied by the Hampton House. The hotel also helped others to envision a thriving affluent community in the area. By 1861, the residents petitioned the Illinois General Assembly to create the Hyde Park Township.

Paul Cornell specifically forbade heavy industry development in Hyde Park. He maintained the character of Hyde Park, which was intended to be an elite suburb bordering Chicago, by selling only large lots that the affluent could afford. The neighborhood flourished for the next two generations.

In 1889, the entire Hyde Park township (the area south of 39th Street, north of 138th Street, and east of State Street), which had quintupled in population from an 1880 population of 15,716 to an 1889 population of 85,000, voted for annexation to the City of Chicago. Paul Cornell planned and advocated a town with a lakefront park, a plaisance, an adjoining park and boulevards shaped the town. His plan for a cornerstone institution to rival Evanston's Northwestern University was at first thwarted by the decision to establish a theological seminary on the north side, but would come to fruition with the foundation of the University of Chicago through the philanthropy of John D. Rockefeller and Marshall Field in 1890.

Hyde Park maintained racially restrictive covenants excluding African Americans from purchasing, leasing, or occupying homes in Hyde Park for nearly one hundred years until this segregative tool was struck down by the United States Supreme Court in a 1940 case, Lee v. Hansberry, concerning the nearby Washington Park Subdivision. Cornell was involved in buttressing Hyde Park's segregation with the installation of restrictive covenants in deeds of land he owned, barring many groups (Negroes, Mongols, Italians, Catholics, etc.) from being subsequent titleholders in the area.

At his death, Cornell bequeathed East End Park (now renamed Harold Washington Park) to the city. The stone pictured above commemorates this gift.

== Civic leadership ==
Cornell is considered the "father of the South Parks System" for his extensive efforts after the American Civil War to create a parks system south of Chicago. Cornell, as a real estate developer, presented a convincing case to city developers that a parks system would increase the value of land surrounding it. Cornell based his arguments on New York City's Central Park, which had substantially raised surrounding real estate values. Repeated attempts eventually got a plan through the Illinois General Assembly. As a civic leader he along with his peer William Le Baron Jenney, the West Parks commissioner, commissioned urban landscape designers such as Frederick Law Olmsted, Calvert Vaux, Ossian Simonds, H. W. S. Cleveland, and Jens Jensen to create landscaped cemeteries, to implement a coordinated parks and boulevard system and to design the railroad-served suburbs to complement urban civilization.

In 1869, the state passed the "Parks Law", which created the north, south and west parks district. The parks districts were established as municipal corporations with funding based on the taxable real estate within its service area. The legislation provided for orderly growth and evolution of the city by outlining not only the powers and duties of the parks districts, but also the geography of the parks and connecting boulevards. Cornell was able to both benefit financially from the $46 million spent on the parks during the remainder of the century and to assume a position of influence over the parks. Cornell served for over 13 years on the South Parks Commission, which regulated parks south of the city. This position enabled him to pursue his vision which was to have a park system that would give "lungs to the great city and its future generations." He also served as the Hyde Park Township's first Town Supervisor. Today, Jackson Park, Washington Park and Harold Washington Park stand as a testament to his efforts. These parks became major selling points that contributed to the growth of Hyde Park.

== Other ventures ==
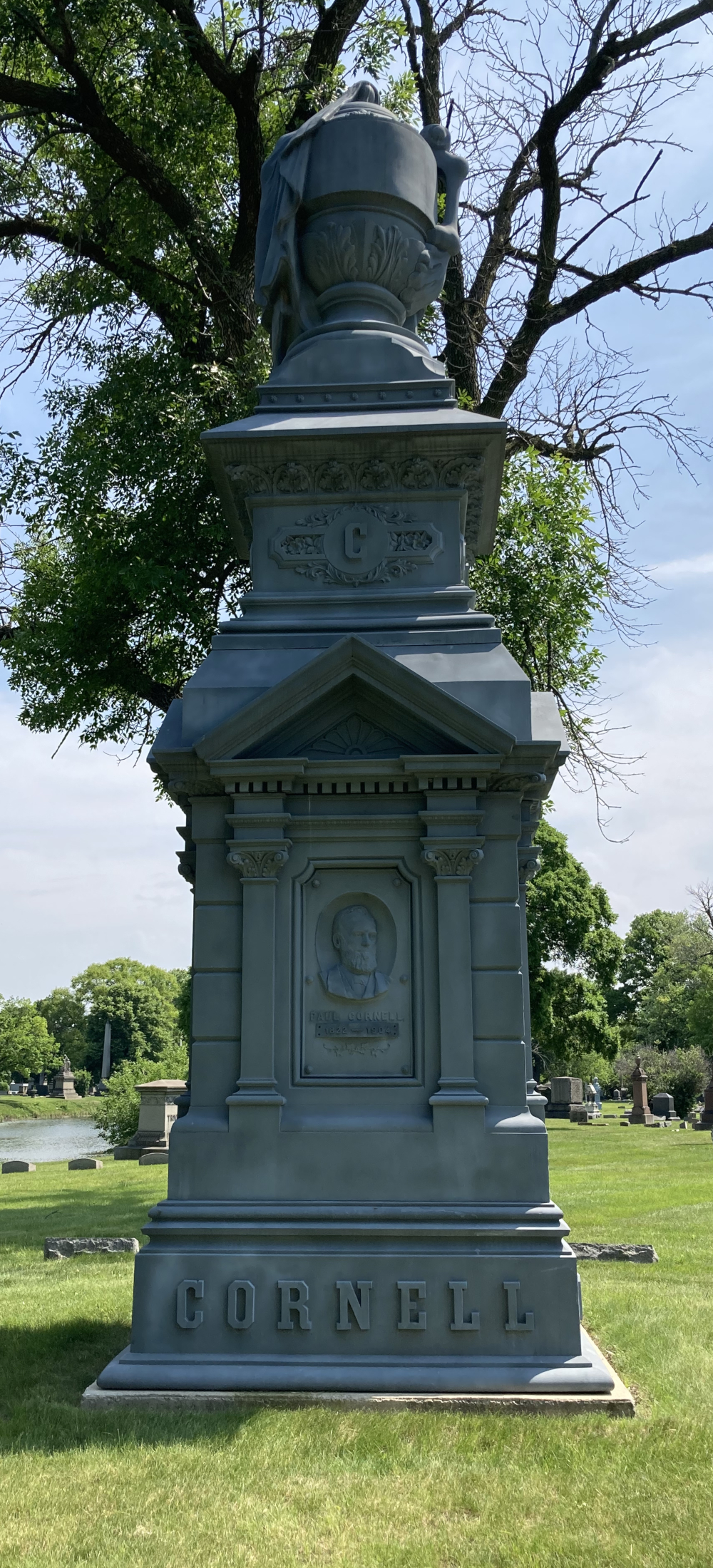
Cornell's grave at Oak Woods Cemetery

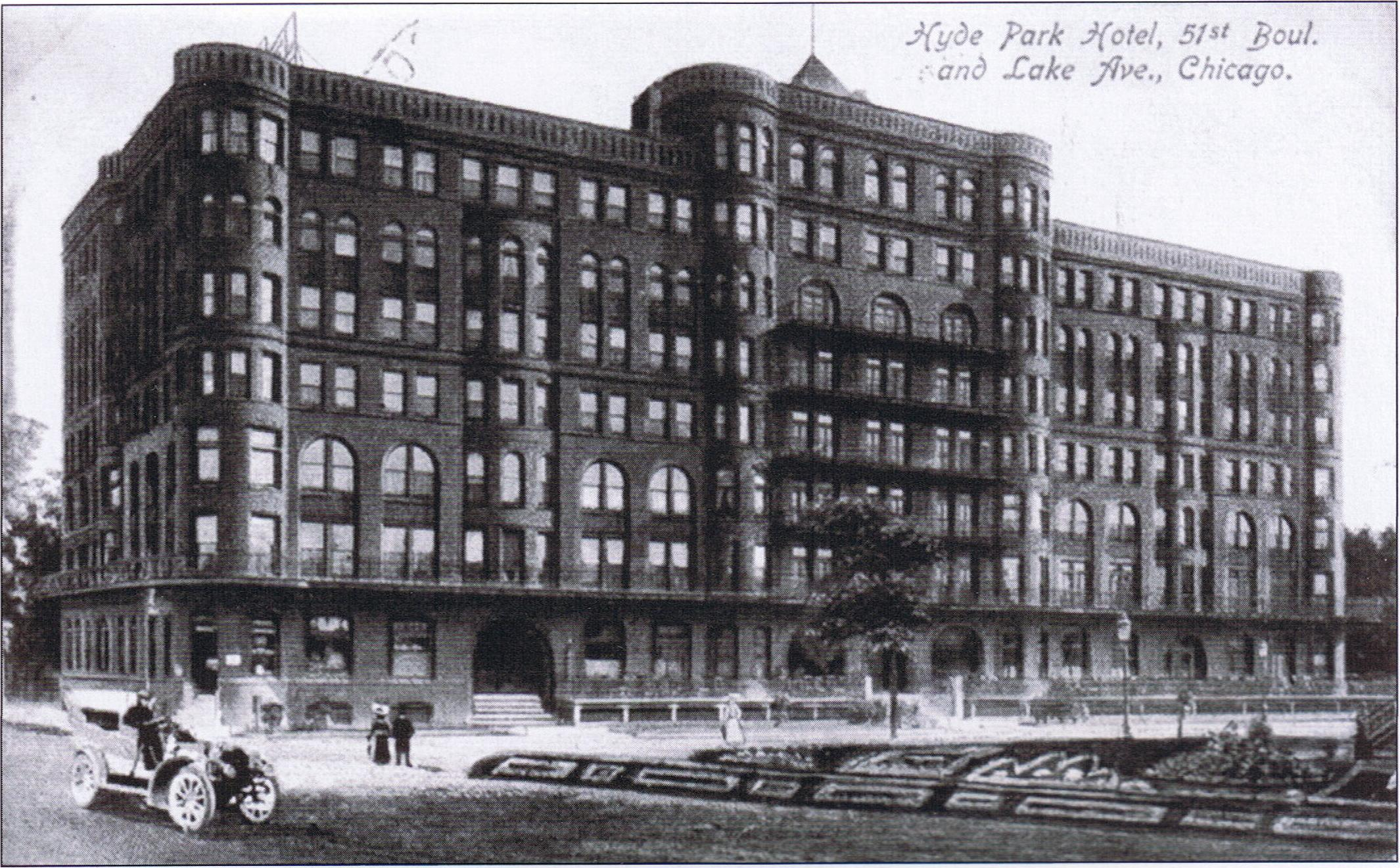
Hyde Park Hotel in 1910

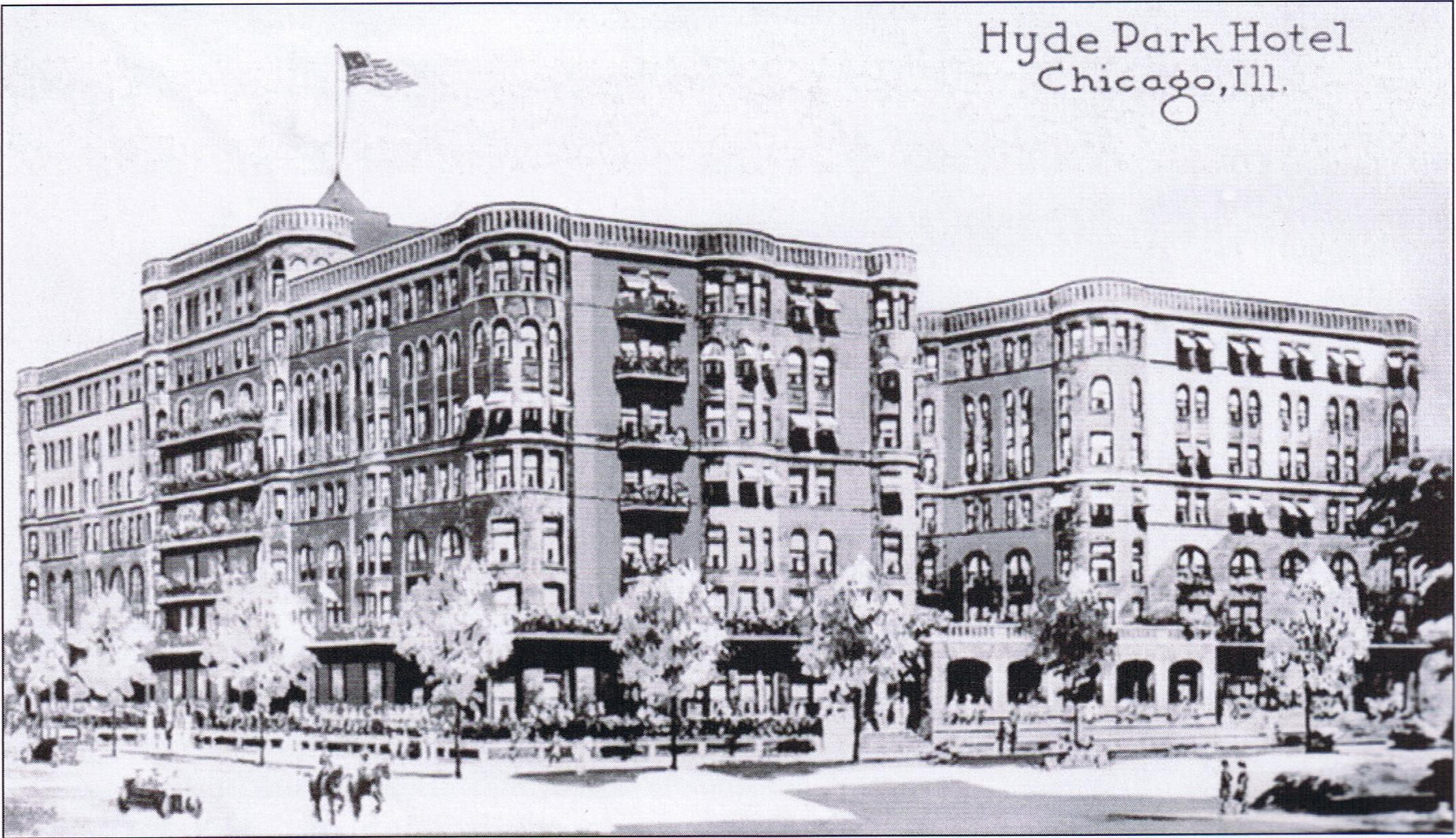
Hyde Park Hotel in 1927

In 1887, Cornell built the Hyde Park Hotel (left, 1887–1963) on the former site of his home at Lake Park and East Hyde Park Boulevard. The hotel was expanded in 1891. In 1914, the hotel expanded (for a second time), which doubled its capacity to 300 rooms (see right).

Paul Cornell also purchased the swampland and prairie 8 miles (12.9 km) south of the Loop at the intersection of the Lake Shore and Michigan Southern Railway and the Illinois Central Railroad at a location that now is 75th Street and South Chicago Avenue in 1855. He subdivided parcels for sale through the 1870s. The area, which was first named Cornell, became Grand Crossing. He had accumulated a total of 960 acres (1.5 sq mi; 3.9 km^{2}) land at one point. The reason that the name was changed was the pre-existence of Cornell, Illinois.

Paul Cornell established the Cornell Watch Factory at 76th Street and the Illinois Central tracks in 1876 in Grand Crossing. Among his other ventures, Cornell founded Republic Life Insurance Company and the American Bronze Company. He served as secretary for a group of Chicagoans who purchased 167 acres (0.68 km^{2}) in 1853 to create Oak Woods Cemetery. He has a 15 feet (4.6 m) tall zinc monument at the cemetery.

== Memorials ==
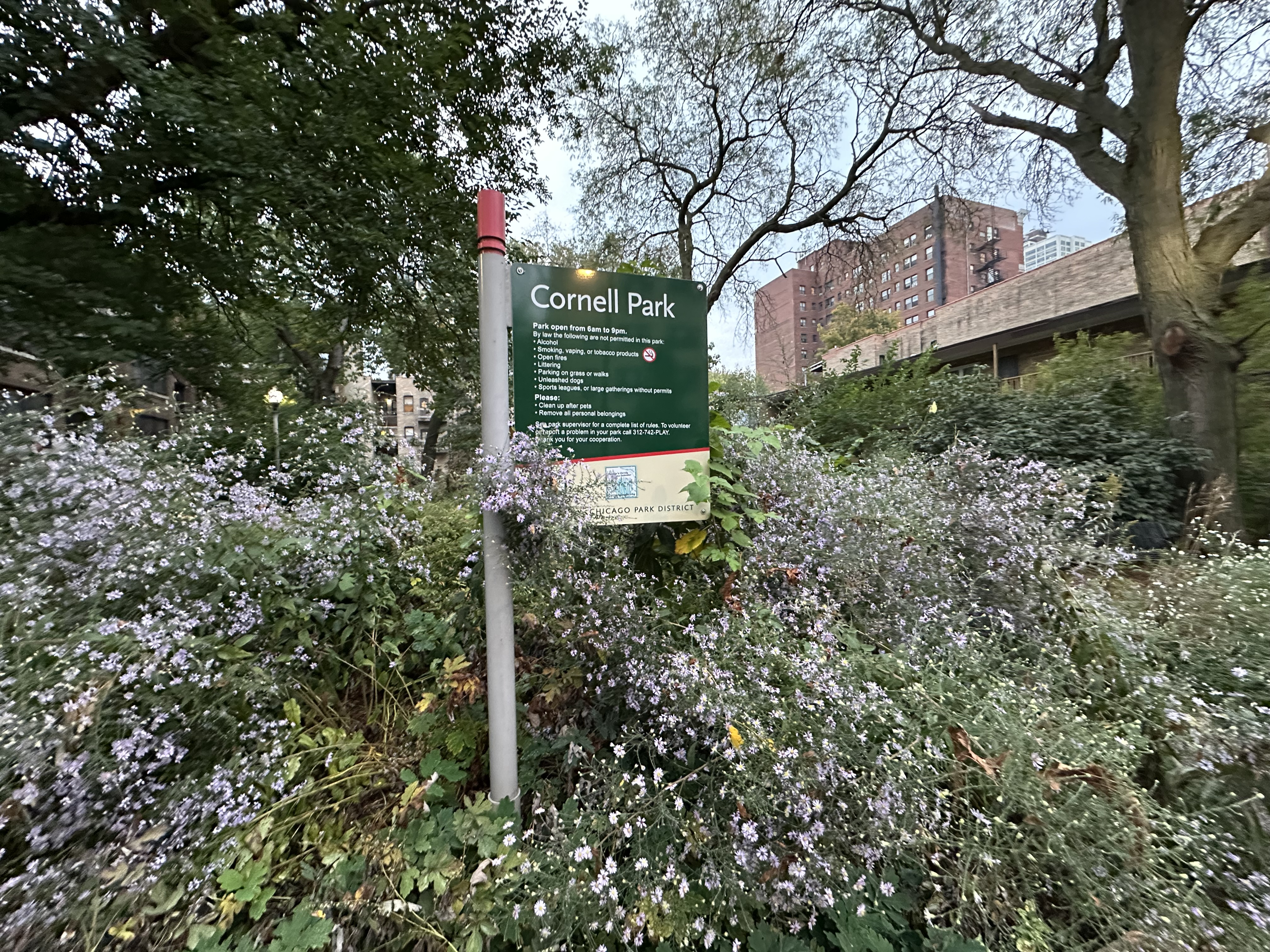
Cornell Park, as seen in 2025

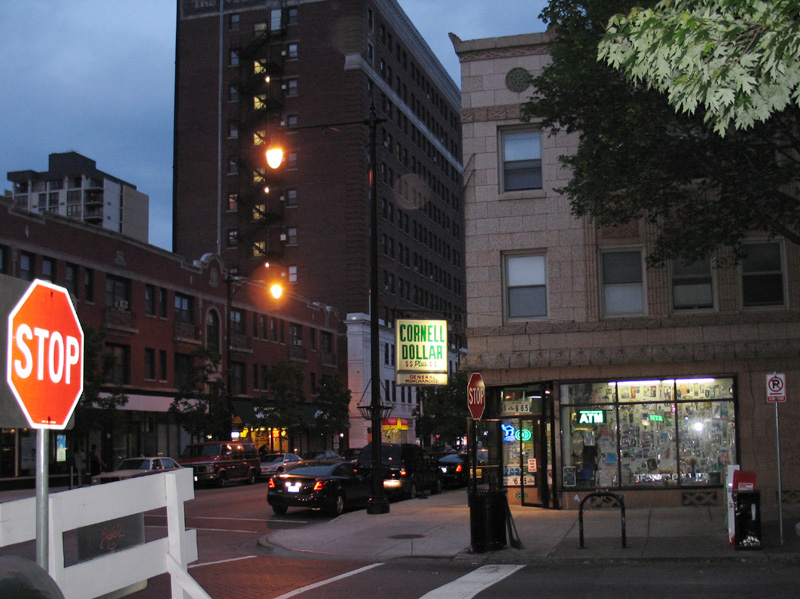
Several commercial establishments along or adjacent to Cornell Avenue have the name 'Cornell' in them

- Cornell Avenue running at along the 1600 east block from 4818 south to 9326 south and Cornell Drive running along the 1632 east block in Jackson Park. Although these roads have different names they are the same street. South Cornell Avenue is the location of several entities, including the Catholic Theological Union building (which also includes the Lutheran School of Theology at Chicago and McCormick Theological Seminary), the Hyde Park Art Center, and the Chicago Beach Apartments.
- Cornell Park, located on Cornell Avenue, is an 0.24 acres (0.097 ha) lot that was preserved from development in the late 1960s and opened in 1973. The Chicago Park District describes it as a "model vest-pocket park", one that includes a large black oak, plantings, a walkway, grassy areas, and a playground.
- The Hyde Park Historical Society gives out annual Paul Cornell Awards.

== Notes ==
=== References ===
Pacyga, Dominic A. and Ellen Skerrett, Chicago: City of Neighborhoods, 1986 Loyola University Press
