= Hyde Park House =

Coordinates: 41°47′58″N 87°34′58″W

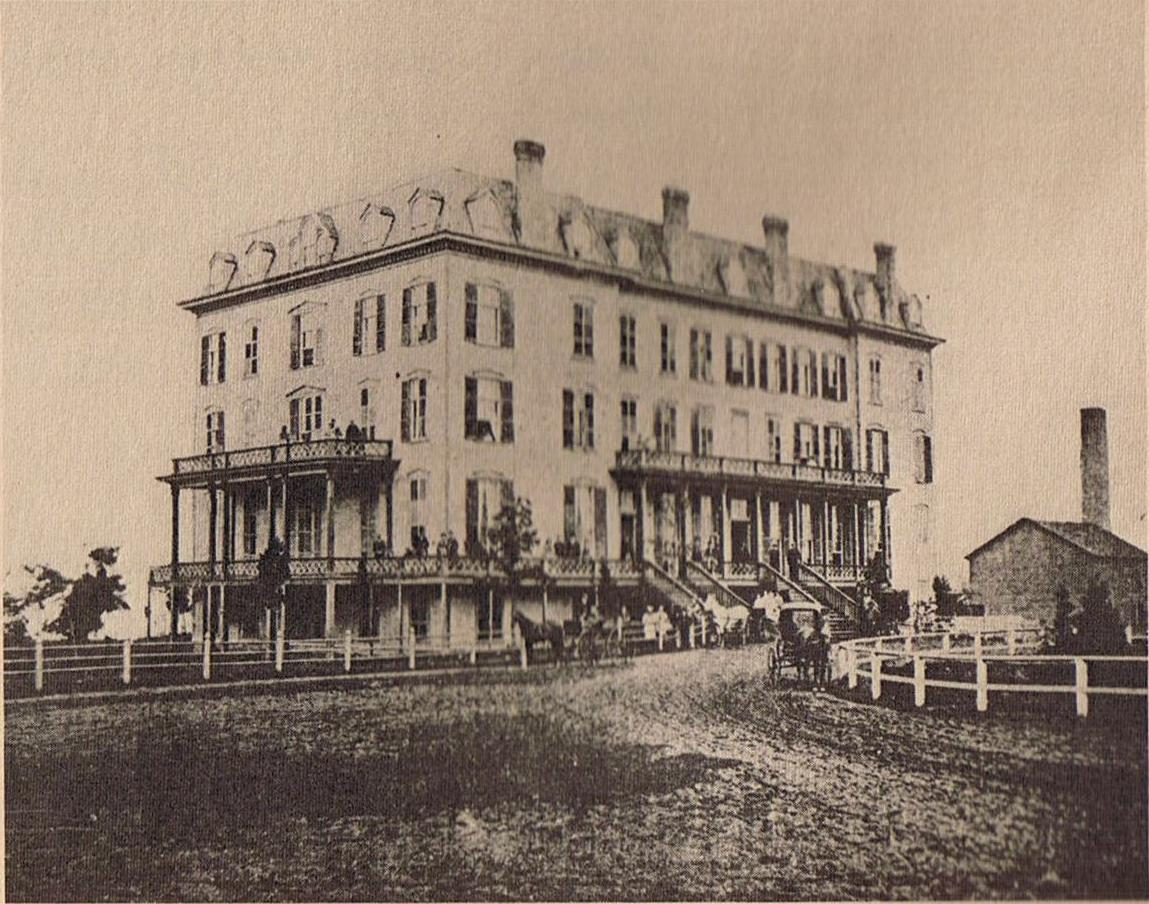
Hyde Park House at 53rd Street and Lake Michigan, Chicago.

The Hyde Park House was a four-story wood frame upscale hotel in Chicago, built and run by Paul Cornell, that served as the centerpiece for Hyde Park social life from 1857 until 1879. It was located on 53rd Street adjacent to Lake Michigan on land currently occupied by the Hampton House.

Cornell successfully marketed Hyde Park as an affluent suburb and resort area. Hyde Park retained this image until the 1930s. The hotel not only served as host to affluent Chicagoans with leisure time and discretionary income, but also served as host to visiting dignitaries. Mary Todd Lincoln brought her sons, Robert and Tad, there after the assassination of Abraham Lincoln where they stayed for two and half months before moving downtown. It also served as host to Prince of Wales, Albert Edward during his 1860 visit to Chicago.

The hotel also served as lodging for those studying new home sites in the region and for those overseeing new residential construction.
