= Hyde Park Township, Illinois =

Former township in Illinois, United States

Hyde Park Township
- Former Township
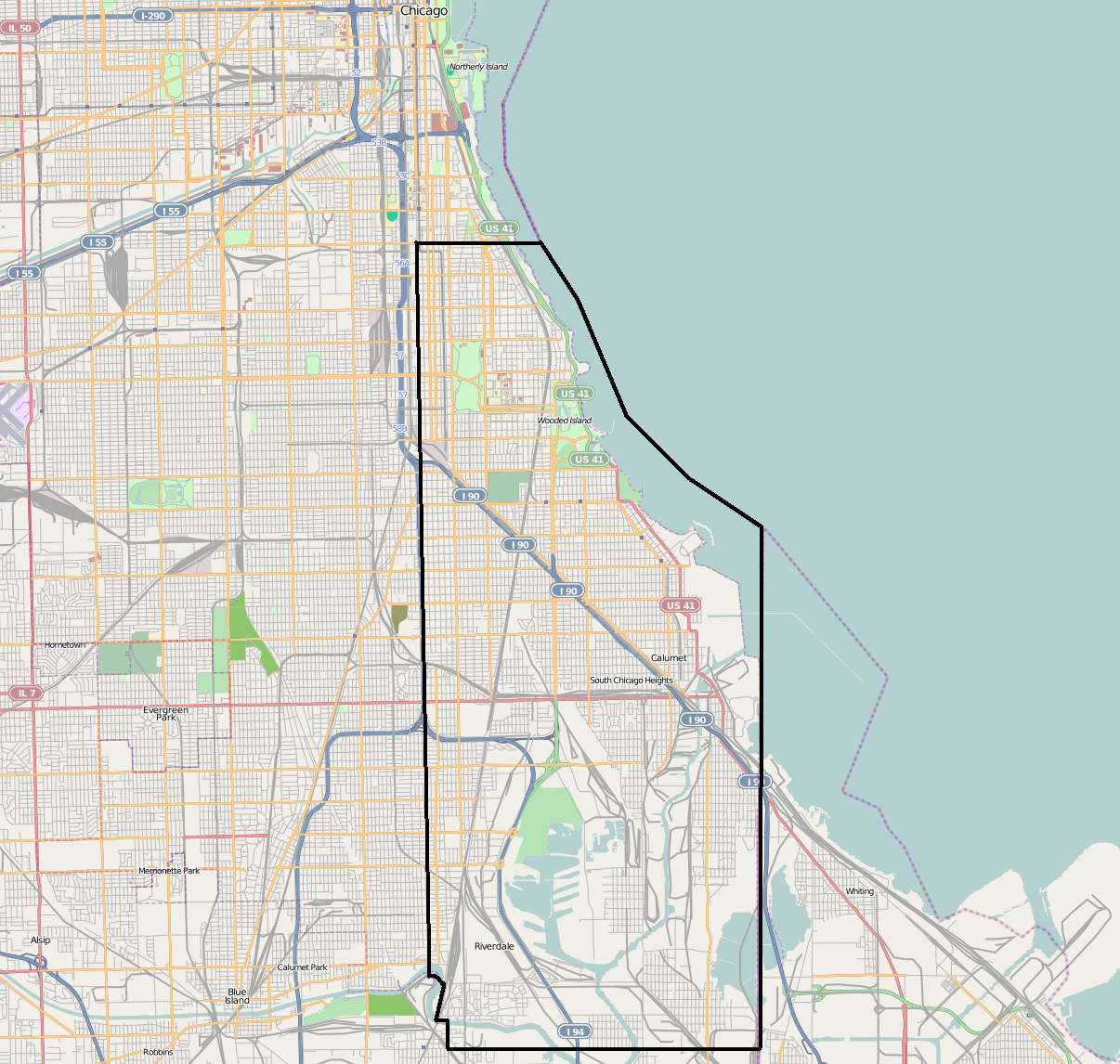
- The original boundaries of Hyde Park Township, imposed on a current map of Chicago
- Interactive map of Hyde Park Township
- Coordinates: 41°44′03″N 87°34′32″W
- Country: United States
- State: Illinois
- County: Cook
- Organized: 1861
- Elevation: 591 ft (180 m)

Population (1889)
  - Total: 85,000
- Time zone: UTC-6 (CST)
  - Summer (DST): UTC-5 (CDT)

Hyde Park Township is a former civil township in Cook County, Illinois, United States that existed as a separate municipality from 1861 until 1889 when it was annexed into the city of Chicago. Its borders are Pershing Road (formerly 39th Street) on the north, State Street on the west, Lake Michigan and the Indiana state line on the east, and 138th Street and the Calumet River on the south. This region comprised much of what is now known as the South Side of Chicago.

During Chicago's initial explosive growth, it developed from an adjacent swampy area to a full-fledged residential, commercial and resort community. However, due to infrastructure limitations, legislative incentives and the lure of better municipal services it, along with numerous adjoining townships, agreed to be annexed into the city of Chicago, creating the largest city in the United States at that time.

== History ==
=== Early years ===
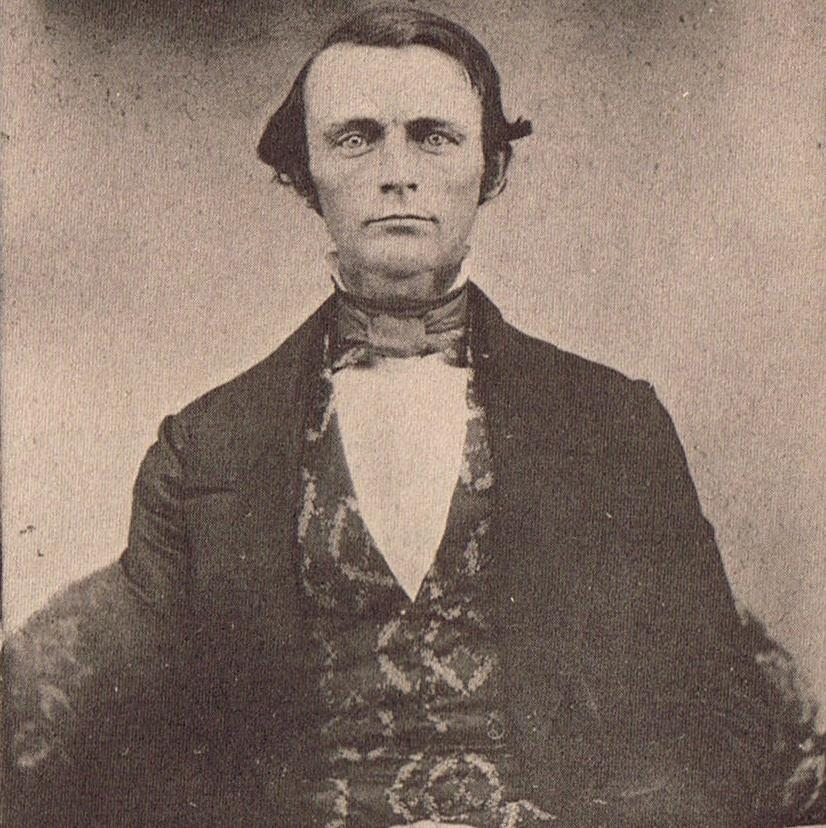
Paul Cornell, the founder of Hyde Park

The township was founded by Paul Cornell, who paid for a topographical survey of the lakefront south of the city in 1852. In 1853, following the advice of Senator Stephen Douglas, he bought 300 acres (120 ha) of speculative property between 51st Street and 55th Street and set about developing the first Chicago railroad suburb. This area was 7 miles (11 km) south of the mouth of the Chicago River and 6 miles (10 km) south of downtown Chicago. In the 1850s, Chicago was still a walkable urban area well contained within a 2 miles (3 km) radius of the center. He selected the name Hyde Park to associate the area with the elite neighborhood of Hyde Park in New York as well as the famous royal park in London. By 1855, he began acquiring large land tracts, which he would subdivide into lots for sale in the 1870s.

In 1837, the City of Chicago incorporated, and by the 1870s, the surrounding townships had followed suit. After 1850, Cook County was divided into basic governmental entities, which were designated as townships as a result of the new Illinois Constitution. Illinois's permissive incorporation law empowered any community of 300 resident citizens to petition the Illinois legislature for incorporation as a municipality under a municipal charter with more extensive powers to provide services and tax local residents. Hyde Park Township was created by the Illinois General Assembly in 1861 within Cook County. This empowered the township to better govern the provision of services to its increasingly suburban residents.

=== Annexation and current status ===
Following the June 29, 1889, elections, several suburban townships voted to be annexed to the city, which offered better services, such as improved water supply, sewerage, and fire and police protection. Hyde Park Township, however, had installed new waterworks in 1883 just north of 87th Street. Nonetheless, the majority of voters in 1889 supported annexation perhaps because of the city's water system for fire prevention or because of the belief that township government had become too unwieldy. After the 1889 annexation, Chicago was able to leverage efficiencies as the largest United States city in area and second largest in population.

The township has no current governmental structure or functions, other than being used by the Cook County Assessor's office for taxation valuation and record keeping purposes. The Hyde Park Historical Society also offers middle school and high school awards with eligibility based on the historical boundaries. Hyde Park was the site of the Columbian Exposition of 1893, and is also the location of the University of Chicago, which was founded two years after Hyde Park was annexed into Chicago, in 1891.

== Location ==
Community areas of Chicago by number.

Hyde Park included the entirety of the following community areas (see map, below right): Hyde Park (41), Kenwood (39), Woodlawn (42), South Shore (43), South Chicago (46), East Side (52), Hegewisch (55), Avalon Park (45), Calumet Heights (48), South Deering (51), Burnside (47), Pullman (50), and Riverdale (54) as well as the southern part of Oakland (36) and the eastern parts of Grand Boulevard (38), Washington Park(40), Greater Grand Crossing (69), Chatham (44), Roseland (49), and West Pullman (53).

== Demographics ==
When first created the township had only 350 residents. The creation of the Union Stock Yards in 1865 changed the evolutionary path of Hyde Park and the neighboring Lake Township, which became the industrial center while Hyde Park became the middle class enclave. The population of the township grew from 3,600 in 1870 to 15,700 ten years later. The Great Chicago Fire saw the population swell. By 1889, the population had reached 85,000.
