= Lincoln Park =

Public park in Chicago, Illinois

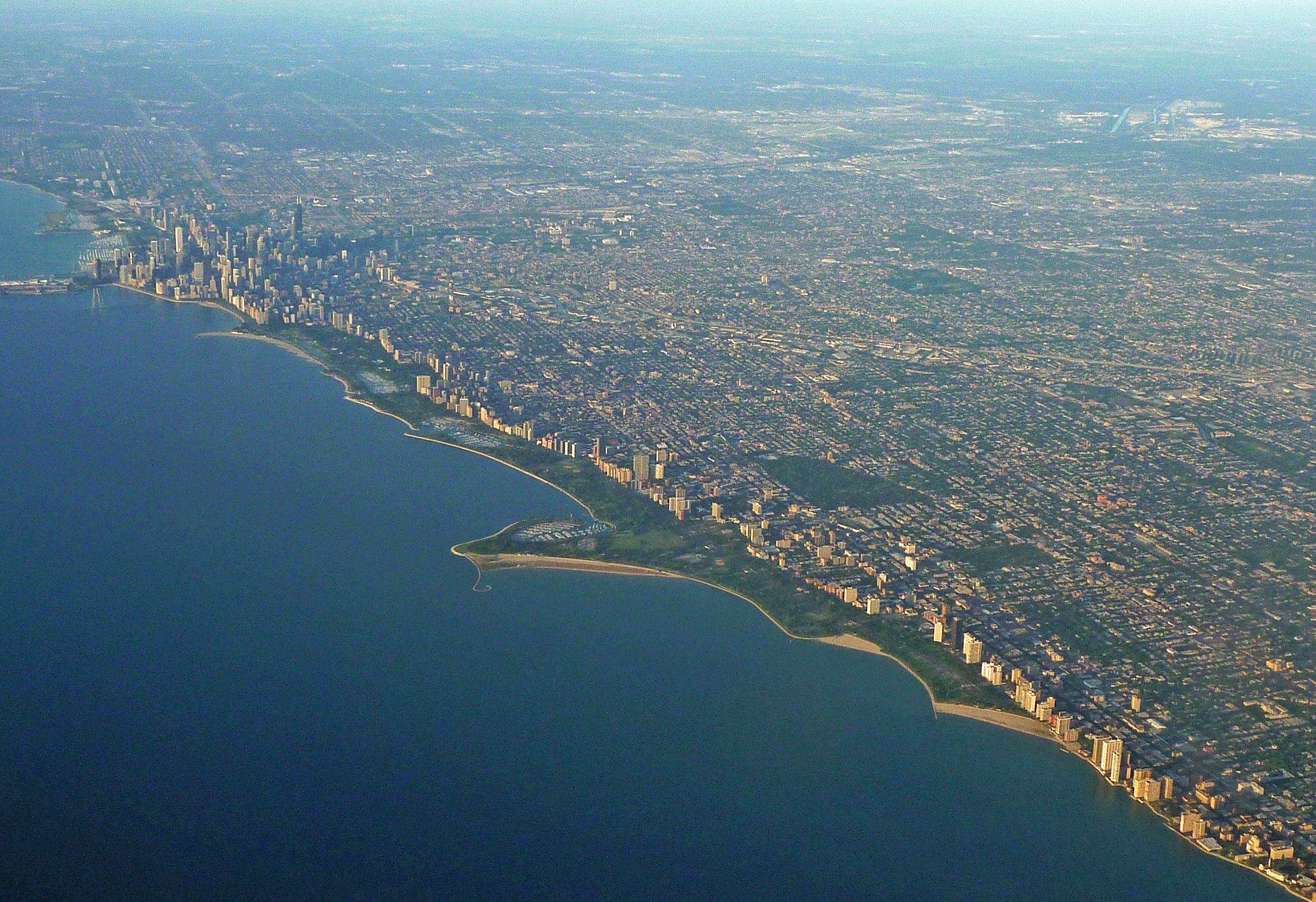
- Aerial view of the seven-mile-long Lincoln Park shoreline
- Interactive map of Lincoln Park
- Type: Urban park
- Location: Chicago
- Coordinates: 41°56′24″N 87°38′06″W
- Area: 1,200 acres (490 ha)
- Created: 1843
- Operator: Chicago Park District
- Lincoln Park
- U.S. National Register of Historic Places
- U.S. Historic district
- Area: 1,208 acres (489 ha)
- Architect: Benson, Olaf; Simonds, Ossian Cole
- Architectural style: Art Deco, Prairie School, Colonial Revival
- MPS: Chicago Park District MPS
- NRHP reference No.: 94001029
- Added to NRHP: August 26, 1994

Lincoln Park is a 1,208-acre (489-hectare) park along Lake Michigan on the North Side of Chicago, Illinois. Named after US president Abraham Lincoln, it is the city's largest public park and stretches for seven miles (11 km) from Grand Avenue (500 N), on the south, to near Ardmore Avenue (5800 N) on the north, just north of the DuSable Lake Shore Drive terminus at Hollywood Avenue. Two museums and a zoo are located in the oldest part of the park between North Avenue (1600 N) and Diversey Parkway (2800 N) in the eponymous neighborhood. Farther to the north, the park is characterized by parkland, beaches, recreational areas, nature reserves, and harbors. To the south, there is a more narrow strip of beaches east of Lake Shore Drive, almost to downtown. With 20 million visitors per year, Lincoln Park is the second-most-visited city park in the United States, behind Manhattan's Central Park.

The park's recreational facilities include baseball/softball fields, basketball courts, beach volleyball courts, cricket pitches, football/soccer fields, a golf course, lacrosse fields, rugby pitches, tennis courts, volleyball courts, field houses, a target archery field, a skate park, and a driving range.

The park also features several harbors with boating facilities, as well as public beaches for swimming, and nature reserves. There are landscaped gardens, public art, bird refuges, a zoo, the Lincoln Park Conservatory, the Chicago History Museum, the Peggy Notebaert Nature Museum, the Alfred Caldwell Lily Pool, and a theater on the lake with regular outdoor performances held during the summer.

== History ==
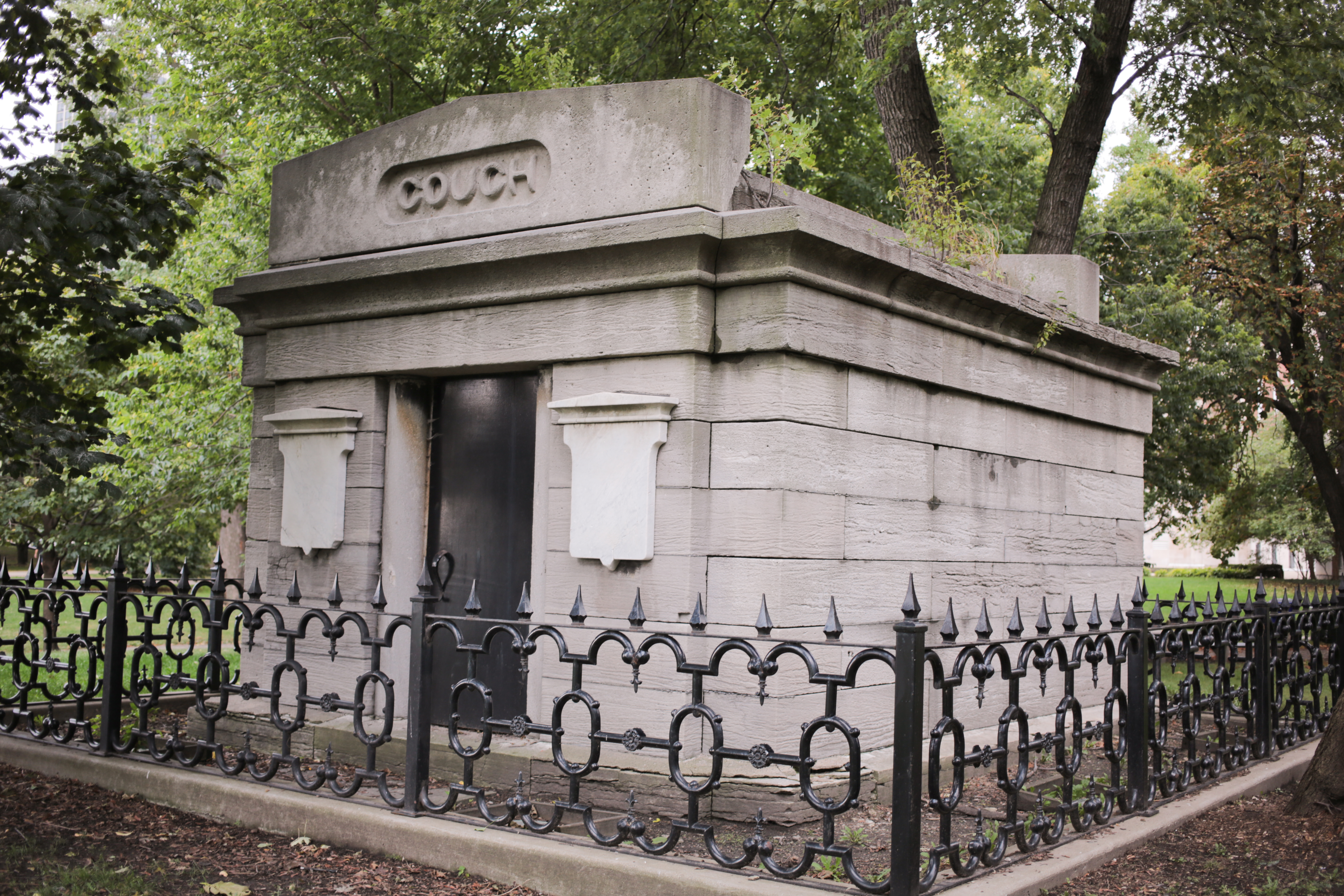
Couch Mausoleum in Lincoln Park, October 2013. This mausoleum is the only standing remnant of the cemetery that existed in part of Lincoln Park in the 19th century.

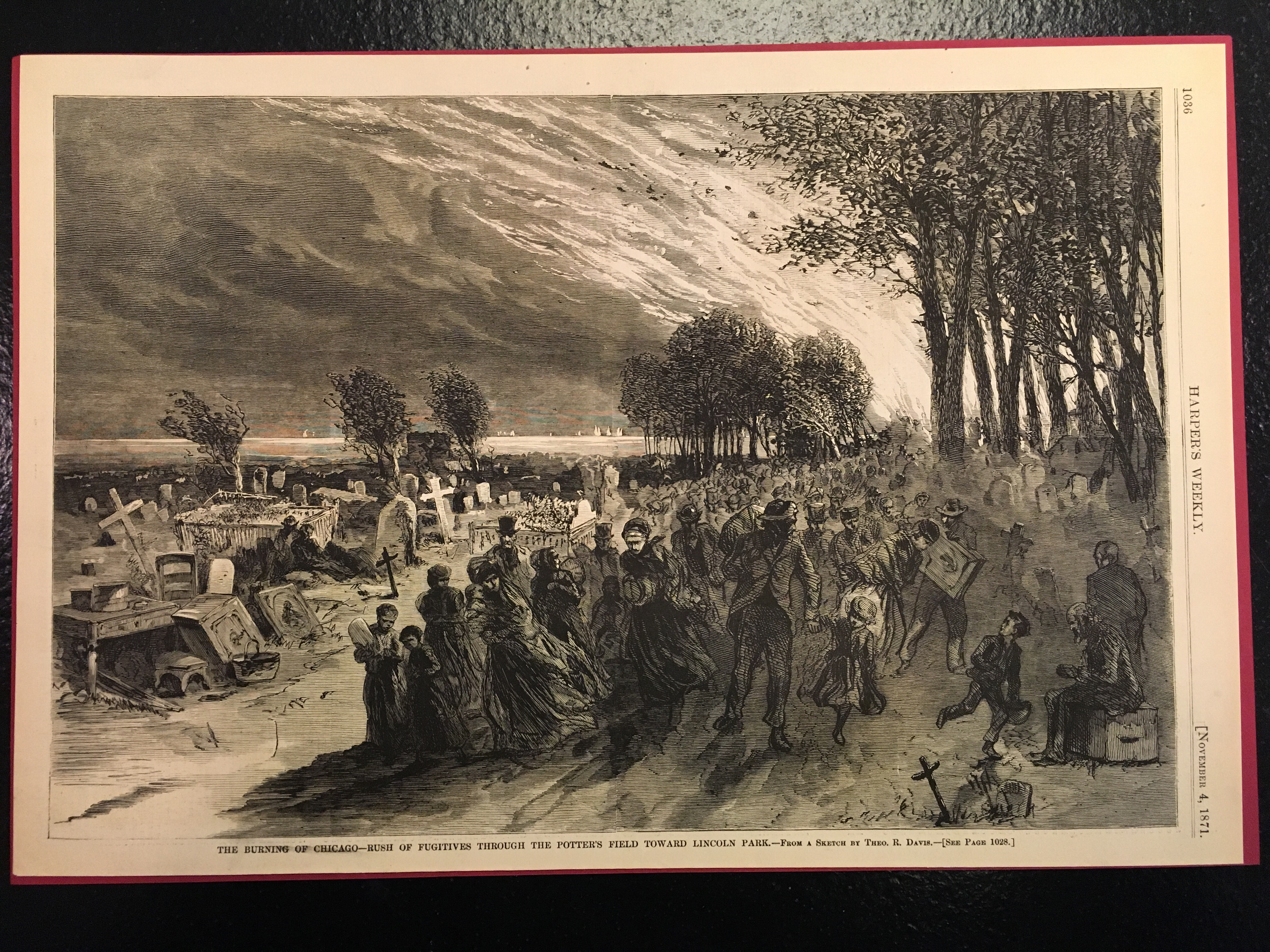
Image from Harper's Weekly of people escaping the Great Chicago Fire by fleeing to the cemetery in Lincoln Park

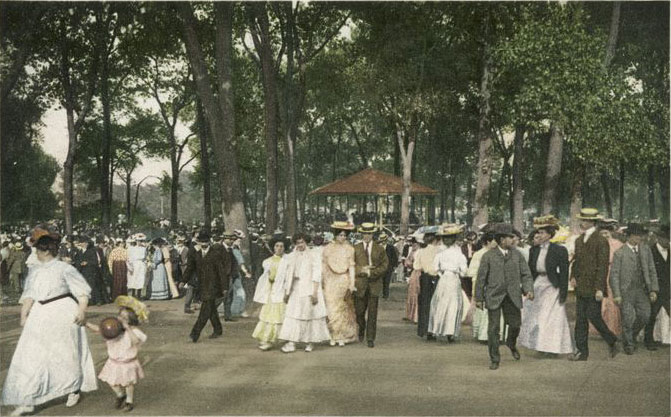
A concert in Lincoln Park circa 1907

In 1860, Lake Park (earlier, Cemetery Park), the precursor of today's park, was established by the city on the lands just to the north of the city's burial ground. Five years later, on June 12, 1865, the park was renamed to honor the recently assassinated President Abraham Lincoln.

Added to the National Register of Historic Places in 1994, part of the oldest section of today's Lincoln Park near North Avenue began its existence as the City Cemetery in 1843. This was subdivided into a Potter's Field, Catholic cemetery, Jewish cemetery, and the general City Cemetery. These cemeteries were the only cemeteries in the Chicago area until 1859. In 1852, David Kennison, who is said to have been born in 1736, died and was buried in City Cemetery. Another notable burial in the cemetery was Chicago Mayor James Curtiss, whose body was lost when the cemetery was added to the park.

Throughout the late 1850s, there was discussion of closing the cemetery or abandoning it because of health concerns. In fall 1858, Dr. John H. Rauch MD suggested that the burial grounds were a health risk, which "might serve extremely well for plantations of grove and forest trees" that would be "useful and ornamental to the city." The idea was dropped during the Civil War, but revived by Dr. Rauch after the war ended.

By 1864, the city council had decided to add all the 120-acre (0.49 km^{2}) cemetery lands north of North Avenue to the park by relocating the graves. The cemetery sections south of North Avenue were also relocated but this land was left for residential development. An estimated 35,000 people total were buried in the cemetery sections of the park, and the plan required the removal of these graves to other newly opened cemeteries further from the city and lake. To this day, the Couch mausoleum can still be seen as the most visible reminder of the history as a cemetery, standing amidst trees, behind the Chicago History Museum. Ira Couch, who is interred in the tomb, was one of Chicago's earliest innkeepers, opening the Tremont House in 1835. Couch is believed to not be the only person interred in the old burial ground in Lincoln Park. A plaque placed nearby states that "the remains of six Couch family members and one family friend are in the tomb." Partially due to the destruction of the Chicago Fire of wooden burial markers, it was difficult to identify many of the remains. As recently as 1998, construction in the park revealed more bodies left over in the nineteenth century burial ground.

Another large and notable group of graves relocated from the site of today's Lincoln Park were those of approximately 4,000 Confederate prisoners of war who died at Camp Douglas. Many prisoners perished between 1862 and 1865 as a result of the poor condition they were in when taken on the battlefield, or of disease and privation existing at the Federal prison. Although the camp was located south of downtown Chicago, near the stockyards, the remains were originally interred at the site of today's Lincoln Park. Today, their gravesites may be found at Oak Woods Cemetery in the southern part of Chicago. A one-acre (4,000 m^{2}) mass grave and a monument erected by Southerners and Chicago friends in 1895 memorializes these Southerners whose earthly remnants remain in the North. Author George Levy believes that remains of many of the Confederate prisoners are still to be found beneath what are currently baseball fields, the former site of the potter's field.

From the 1860s through the 1950s the park expanded south and then north along seven miles (11 km) of Chicago's Lakefront. (See reference notes 1, 2 and 3). The establishment of public parkland along all of Chicago's Lakefront was a central tenet of the 1909 Burnham Plan for the development of Chicago. From 1912 until 1991, the park contained the Lincoln Park Gun Club.

Another aspect of park history were the Young Lords Lincoln Park neighborhood sit ins and take-overs of institutions under the leadership of Jose Cha Cha Jimenez, protesting the displacement of Latinos by Mayor Richard J. Daley's urban renewal policies.

Anti-Vietnam War protesters in Lincoln Park during the 1968 Democratic National Convention. The band MC5 can be seen playing.

It was also the scene of violent events that took place during the 1968 Democratic National Convention. These events transpired around the convention center, Grant Park, Old Town, and the park.

I pointed out that it was in the best interests of the City to have us in Lincoln Park ten miles (16 km) away from the Convention hall. I said we had no intention of marching on the Convention hall, that I didn't particularly think that politics in America could be changed by marches and rallies, that what we were presenting was an alternative life style, and we hoped that people of Chicago would come up, and mingle in Lincoln Park and see what we were about.

— Abbie Hoffman, from the Chicago 7 trial

== Zoo, conservatory and museums ==
=== Zoo ===
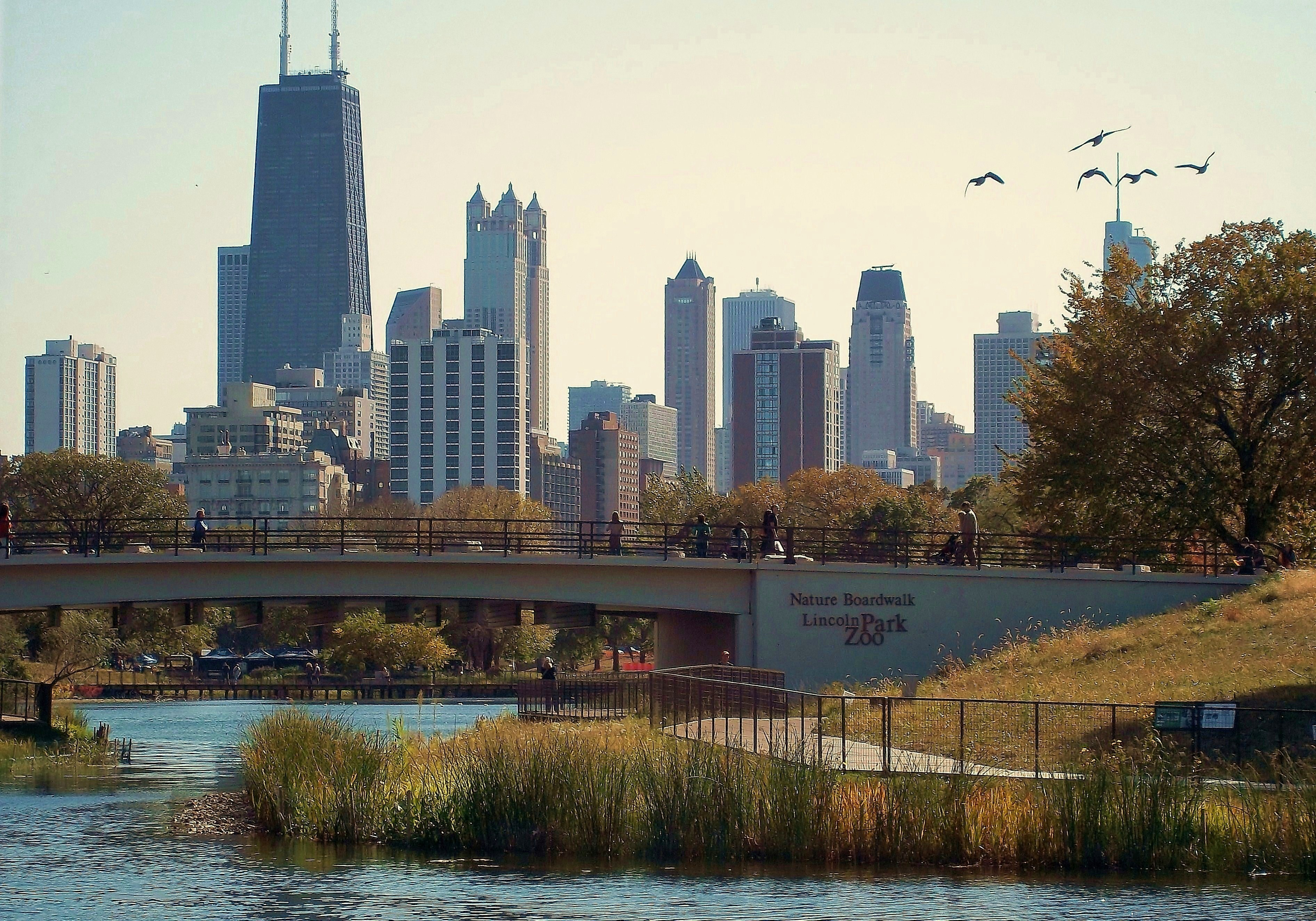
Lincoln Park Zoo Nature Boardwalk

Lincoln Park is well known for Lincoln Park Zoo, a free zoo that is open year-round. Lincoln Park Zoo is home to big cats, penguins, apes, reptiles, monkeys, and other species totaling to nearly 1,250 animals. The Pritzker Family Children's Zoo includes various North American wildlife and an indoor play area. Farm-in-the-Zoo is a representation of a working farm with cows, goats, ponies, pigs, and chickens; at select times, visitors can feed and interact with the animals at Farm-in-the-Zoo. In 2010, the Zoo transformed the South Pond into Nature Boardwalk, a managed habitat with prairie and wetland features.

=== Conservatory ===
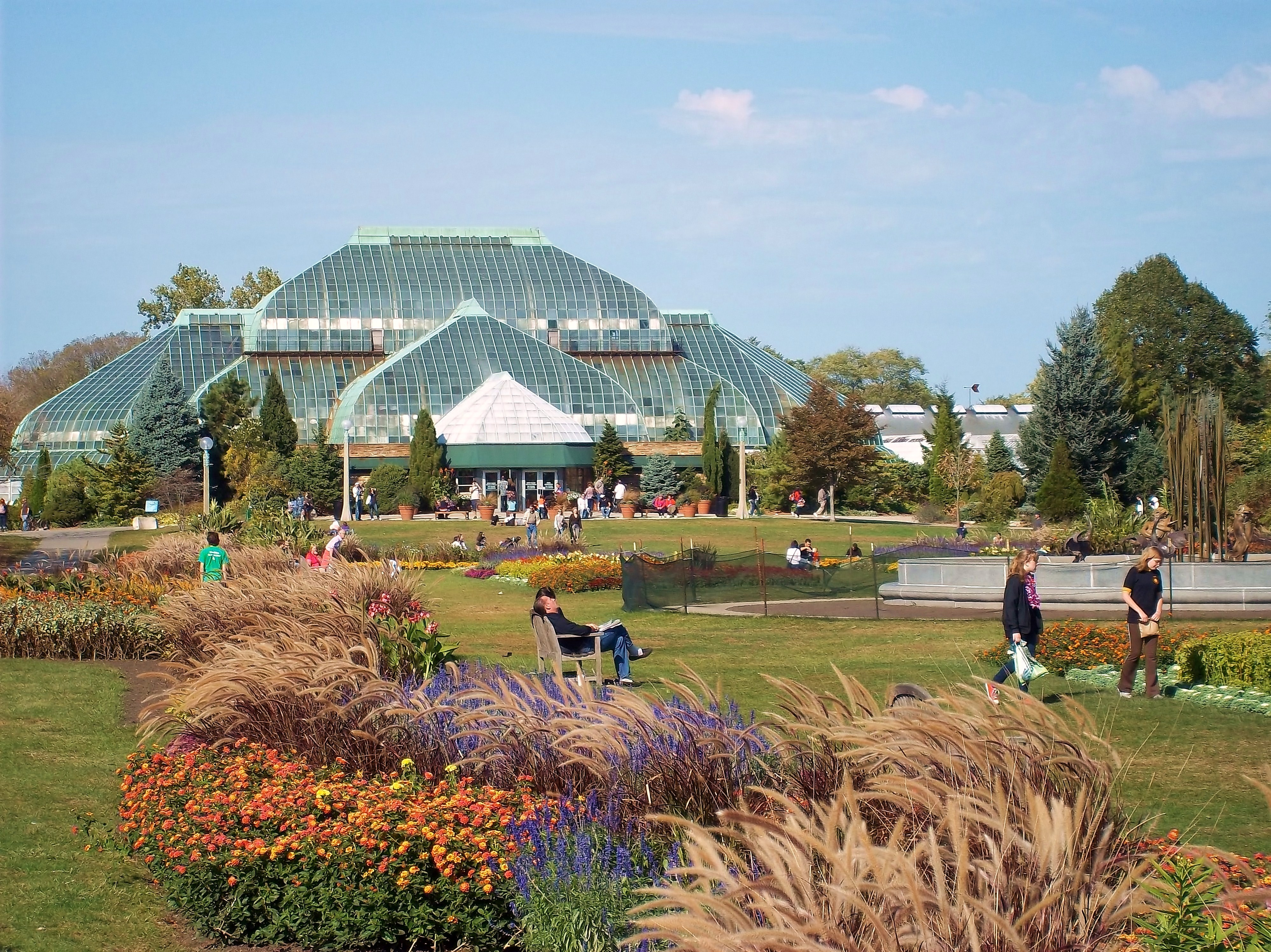
Lincoln Park Conservatory

The Lincoln Park Conservatory offers year-round displays of plants from many different climates around the world. Today's conservatory was built in stages from 1890 to 1895. It consists of a vestibule, four display halls and fifteen propagating and growing houses. The vestibule and Palm House were built and opened to the public in 1892 and contain giant palms and rubber trees, including a 15 m (49 ft) fiddle-leaf rubber tree planted in 1891. In the Palm House, one can also find Garden Figure, a sculpture by Frederick Hibbard. The Fern Room or Fernery was opened in 1895. It contains plants of the forest floor, primarily a vast collection of ferns. The Tropical Room was originally called the stove house. Opened in 1895, it contained an assortment of tropical plants suspended from bark-covered walls. It is now called the Orchid Room and has a collection of approximately 25,000 natural species. The Display House is used for seasonal flower and plant exhibits. A docent program run by the Chicago Park District and Lincoln Park Conservancy provides free tours of the Conservatory and its outdoor gardens from 1–4 p.m. on Fridays, Saturdays, and Sundays and from 9 to Noon on Saturdays.

=== Lily Pool ===
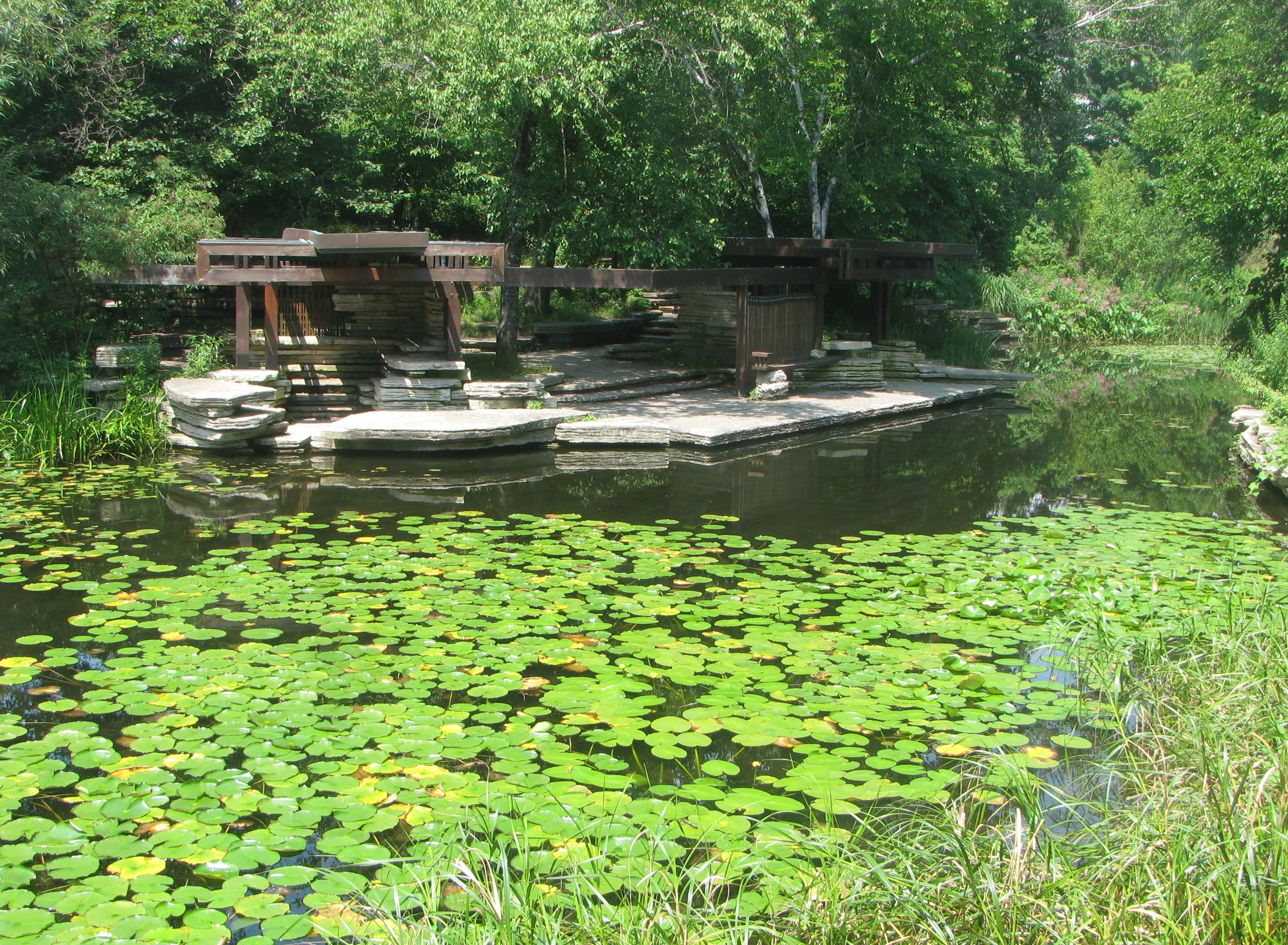
The Alfred Caldwell Lily Pool in Lincoln Park is a National Historic Landmark listing.

Located on Fullerton Parkway between Stockton and Cannon Drives, the Alfred Caldwell Lily Pool is an historic example of Prairie School landscape architecture. The Lily Pool was listed on the National Register of Historic Places and as a National Historic Landmark on February 17, 2006. The Lily Pool had originally been built to cultivate tropical water lilies in 1889. In the 1930s, the Works Progress Administration hired landscape architect Alfred Caldwell to redesign the pool in the Prairie School style. From 1998 to 2002, the Lily Pool underwent an extensive restoration by the Lincoln Park Conservancy and the Chicago Park District, which earned the site its historic designations, and renamed the site after Alfred Caldwell. The Lily Pool is open seasonally from mid-April to mid-November from 7:30 a.m. to the earlier of dusk or 7:30 p.m. every day. A docent program run by the Chicago Park District and Lincoln Park Conservancy offers free tours from 1–4 p.m. on Fridays, Saturdays, and Sundays, and from 9 – Noon on Saturdays during operating season.

=== Nature Museum ===
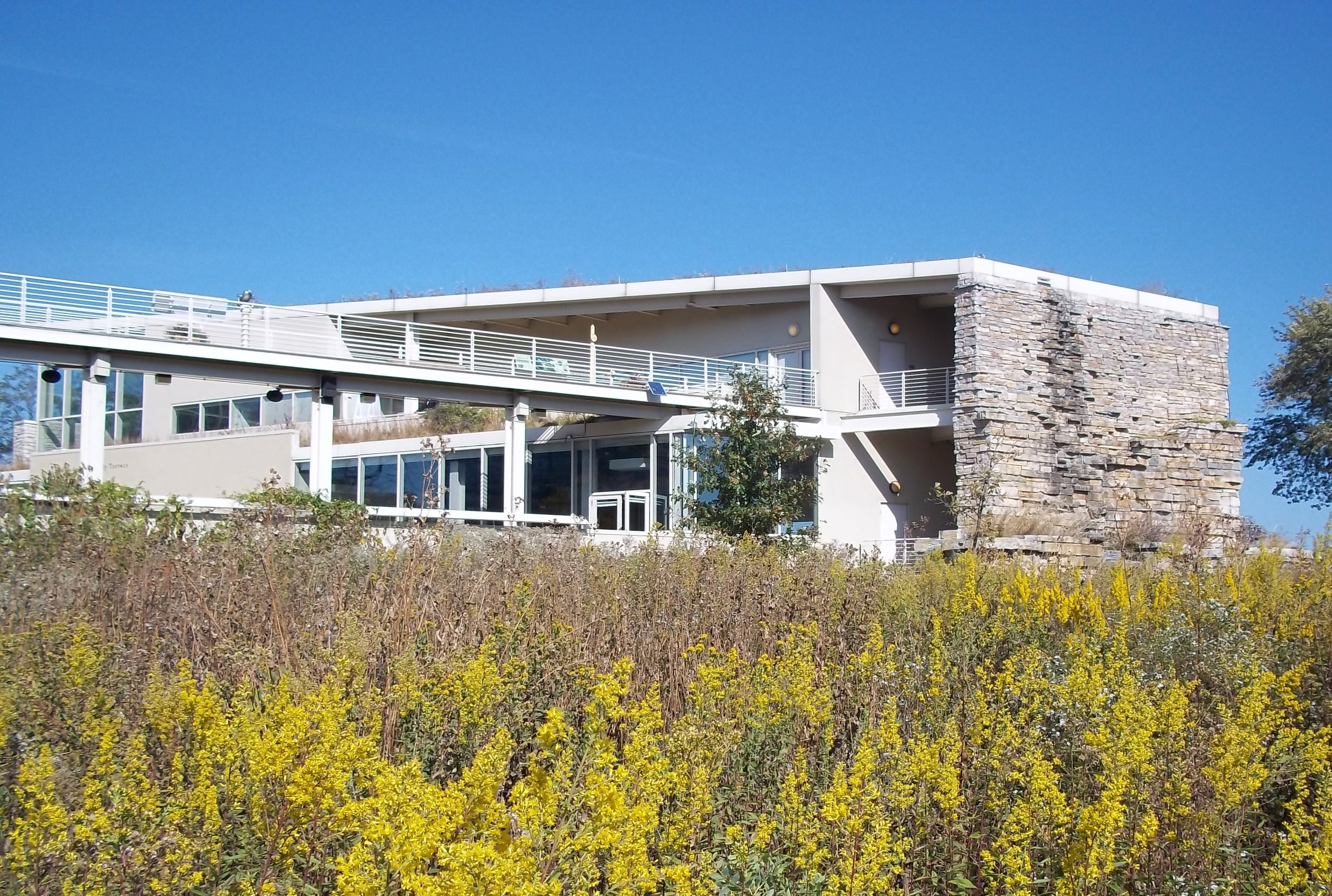
Peggy Notebaert Nature Museum–Chicago Academy of Sciences, south wing, with tallgrass prairie overlook

First established in 1857, the Chicago Academy of Sciences opened its most recent facility, the Nature Museum, in 1999. The academy's previous museum building, the Matthew Laflin Memorial Building, was the Park District's first museum in the parks. The museum's exhibits include displays about the ecological history of the Illinois region, a live butterfly house, and a green home demonstration. The butterfly house features over 200 species of exotic butterflies. The museum also offers educational programs for adults and children.

=== History Museum ===
Located at Clark Street and North Avenue, the Chicago History Museum (formerly the Chicago Historical Society) is dedicated to Chicago's human history. Perhaps among its most well-known possessions are Abraham Lincoln's deathbed and several furniture pieces from the room where he died in the Petersen House in Washington, D.C., as well as clothing he and wife Mary Todd Lincoln wore the evening of his assassination. The museum also houses Chicago's most important collection of materials related to local history from the Great Chicago Fire to the Young Lords in Lincoln Park. In addition to the exhibits, the museum continues to house an extensive research library which includes books and other published materials, manuscripts, paintings, sculptures, and photos.

== Recreational areas ==
=== Facilities ===
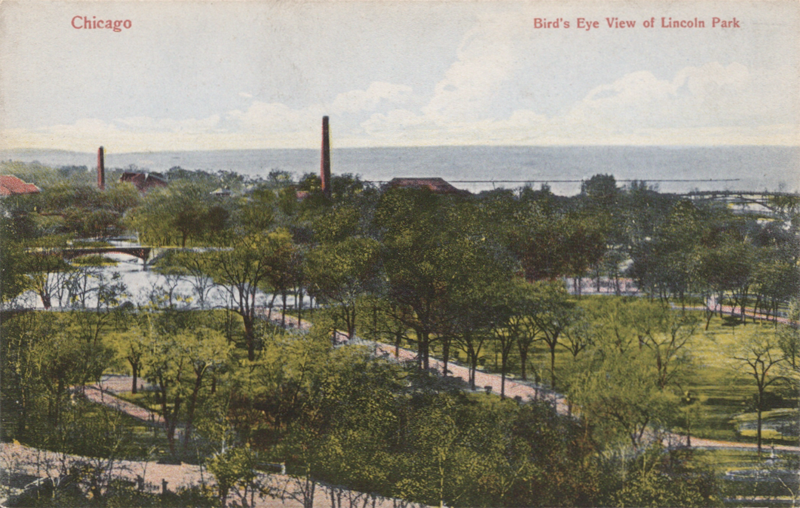
A postcard of the park circa 1900

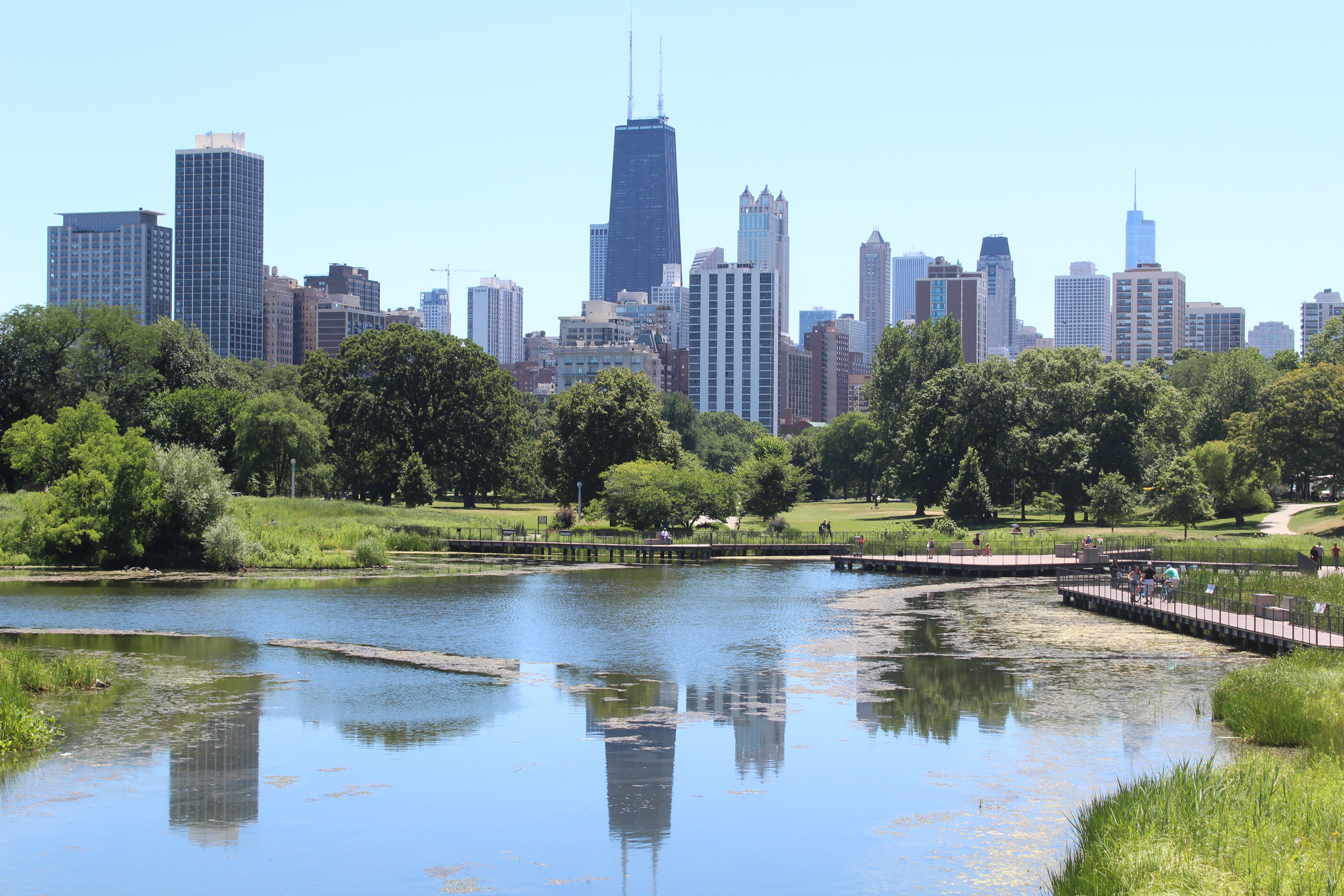
View of Chicago from the South Pond bridge in July 2018

Lincoln Park runs from north to south through five Chicago community areas: Edgewater, Uptown, Lake View, Lincoln Park, and Near North. Along its seven-mile (11 km) stretch, Lincoln Park has many specialized spaces for recreational activities. The Park contains playgrounds; basketball, beach volleyball, tennis, volleyball courts, boating facilities; beaches; swimming; field and beach houses; running and bike paths; playing fields and pitches; archery, baseball, cricket, football, lacrosse, rugby, soccer, softball; a golf course; a driving range; skate park, and areas for horseback riding. Near Montrose Point is Cricket Hill, one of few sledding hills available in Chicago parks.

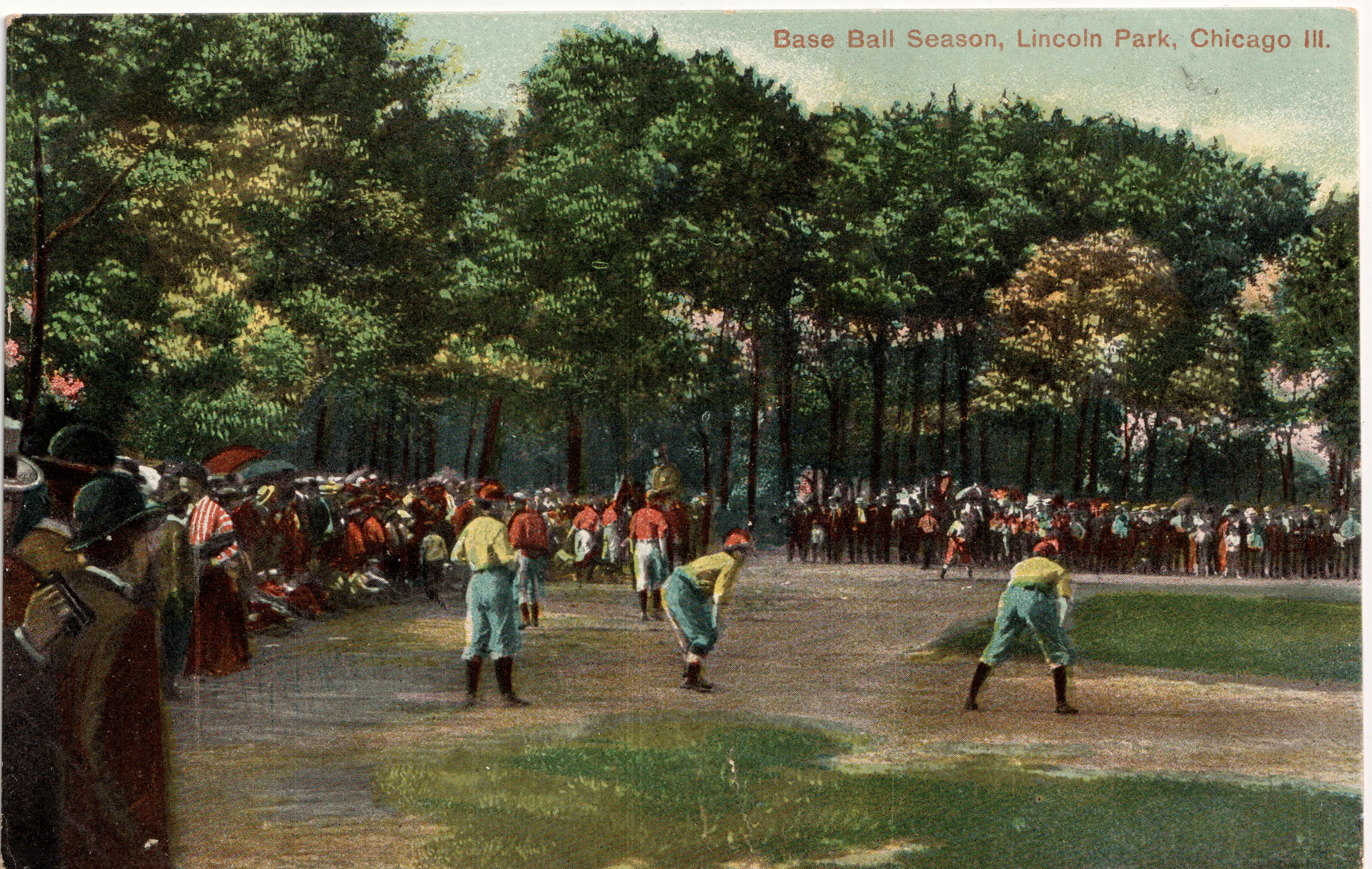
An amateur baseball game in Lincoln Park, Chicago, in the early 20th century

=== Beaches ===
There are seven public beaches for swimming, sunbathing, and beach volleyball along the park's 7-mile shoreline that are guarded during the summer months. The beaches from north to south are, Thorndale, Hollywood, and Foster in Edgewater; Montrose in Uptown; North Avenue in Lincoln Park; and Oak Street and Ohio in Near North. The first City of Chicago public beach, North Avenue Beach, opened in Lincoln Park in 1895. The Lincoln Park Passerelle, a footbridge, connected to the beach in 1940 over the newly constructed Lake Shore Drive.

=== Golf ===
The Waveland Avenue Golf Course (now Sydney R. Marovitz Golf Course) in the Uptown and Lakeview, Chicago neighborhoods section of the park provides a lakeside setting for the game. (41°57′09″N 87°38′29″W) Known for its challenging narrow fairways, it offers nine tees on a par-36 course. Further south, inland of Lakeshore Drive, is a driving range and miniature golf course.

=== Boating ===
There are three harbors in the Park providing marina and docking facilities for boaters: north to south, they are Montrose in Uptown, Lakeview's Belmont Harbor, and Diversey Harbor in the Lakeview and the Lincoln Park Neighborhoods. Montrose Harbor provides 630 dock facilities and is home to the Chicago Corinthian Yacht Club. Belmont Harbor provides 730 moorings, a fuel dock and a ship store. The Chicago Yacht Club has a Belmont station and the Belmont Yacht Club is located here. Diversey Harbor has 714 moorings and the Diversey Yacht Club provides a fueling dock. There is also a public launch at Diversey and the park also has rowing, sculling, and crewing channels.

=== Chicago Lakefront Trail ===
The Chicago Lakefront Trail (abbreviated as LFT) is an 18-mile multi-use path in Chicago along the coast of Lake Michigan. It is popular with cyclists and joggers. It is designed to promote bicycle commuting. From north to south, it runs through Lincoln Park, Grant Park, Burnham Park and Jackson Park.

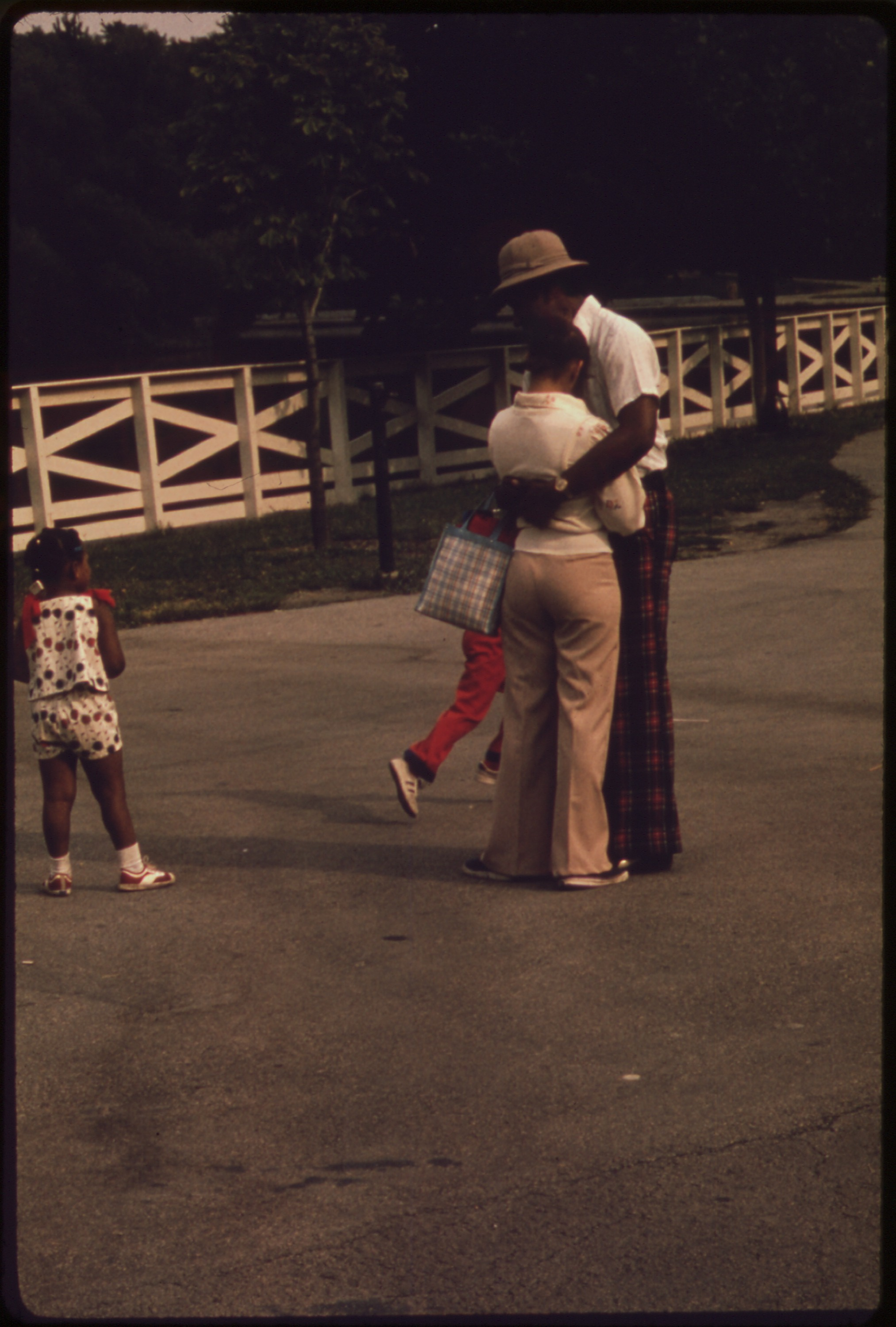
People in Lincoln Park in 1973

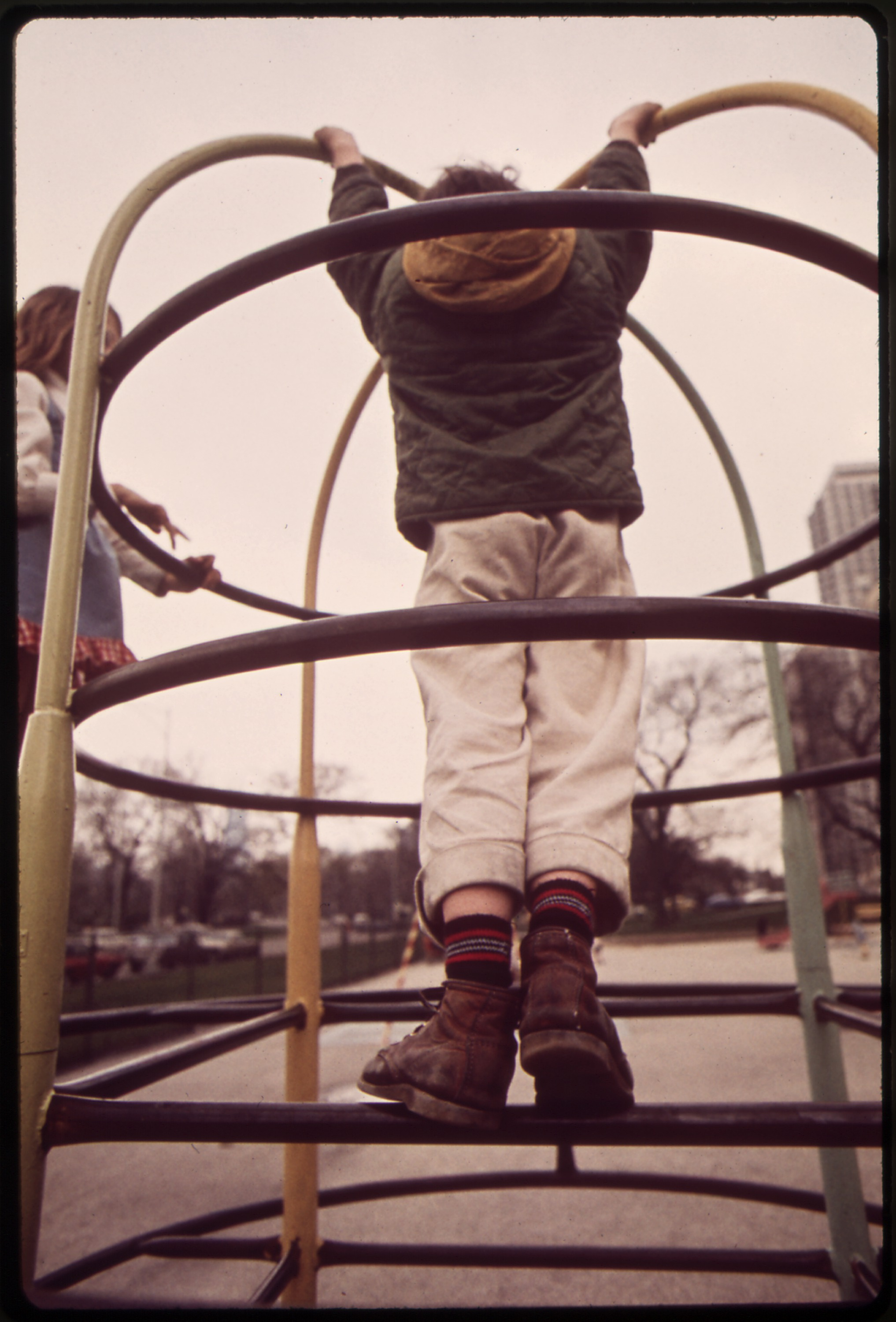
A playground in Lincoln Park in 1973

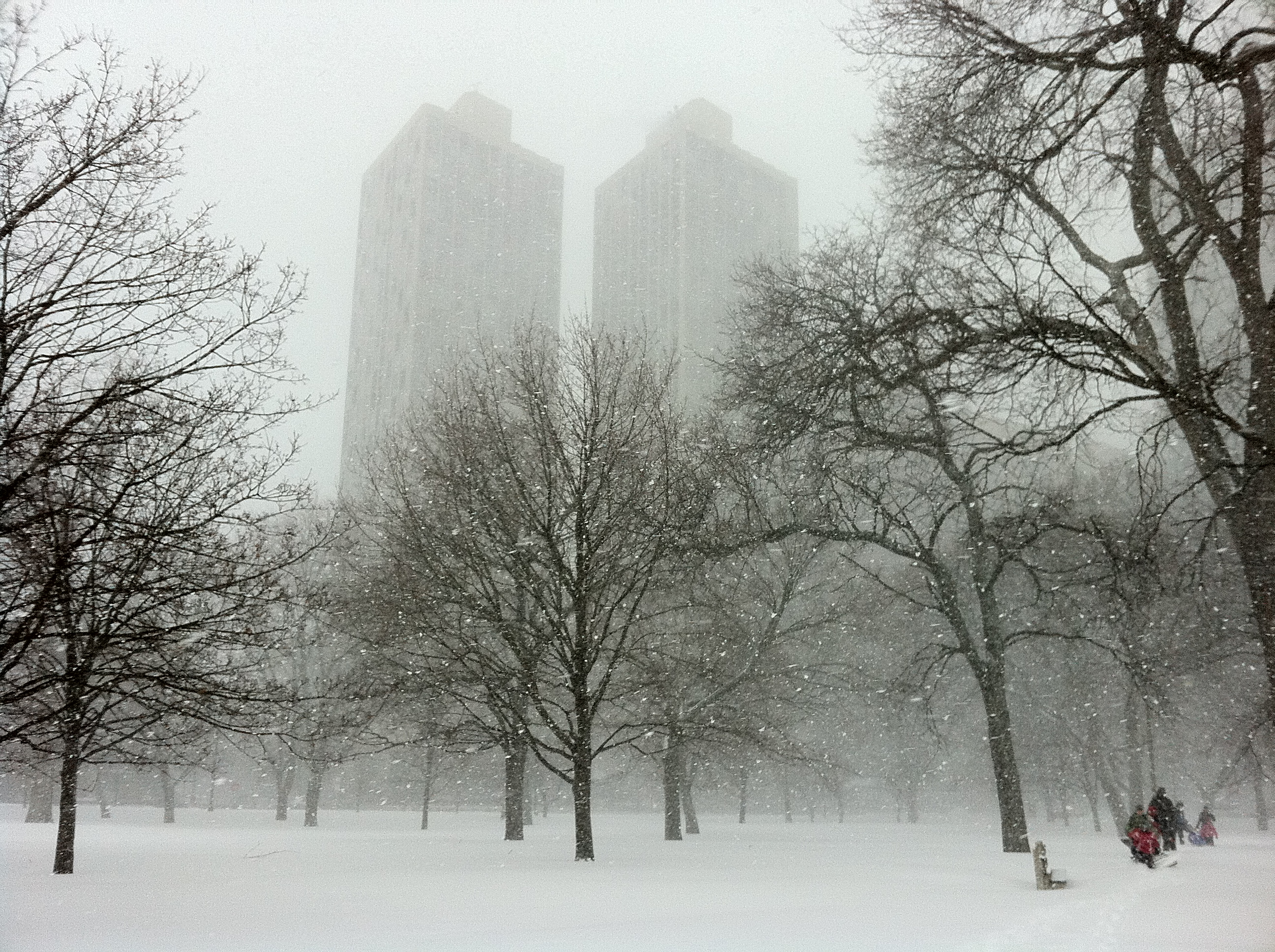
Children playing in Lincoln Park during a 2011 snowstorm

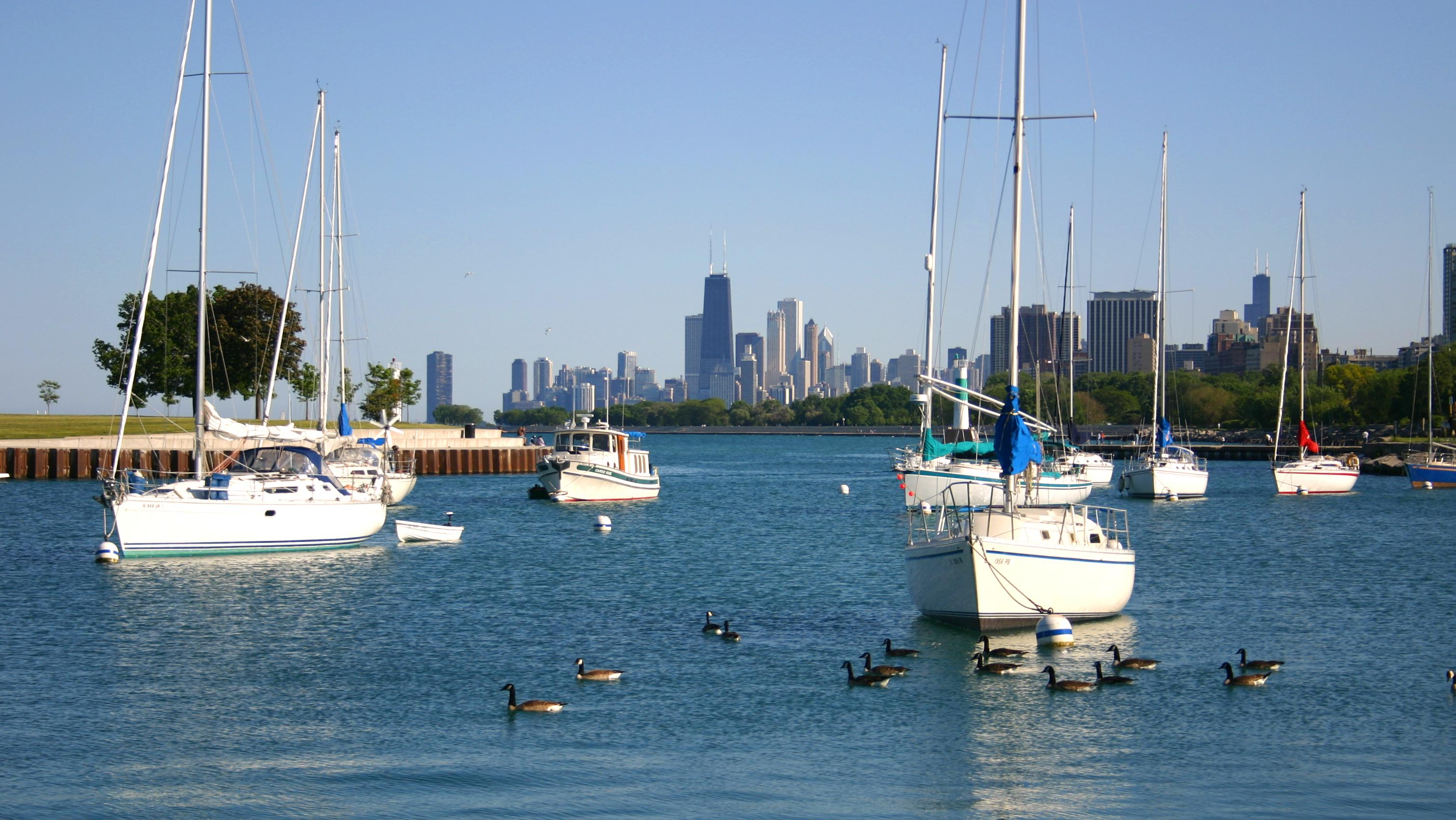
Montrose Harbor and other harbors in the park provide marina and docking facilities

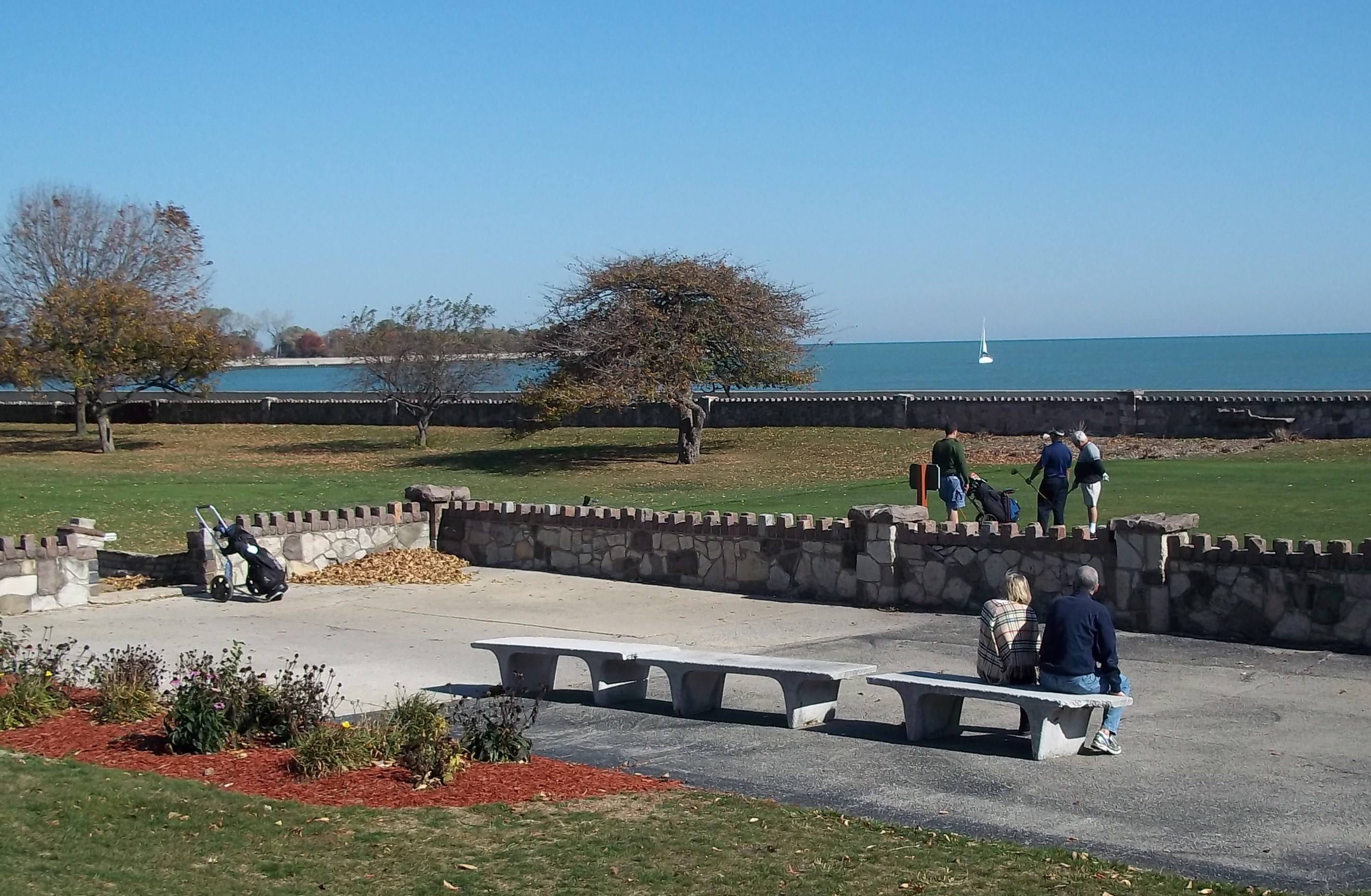
First tee at Waveland Golf Course

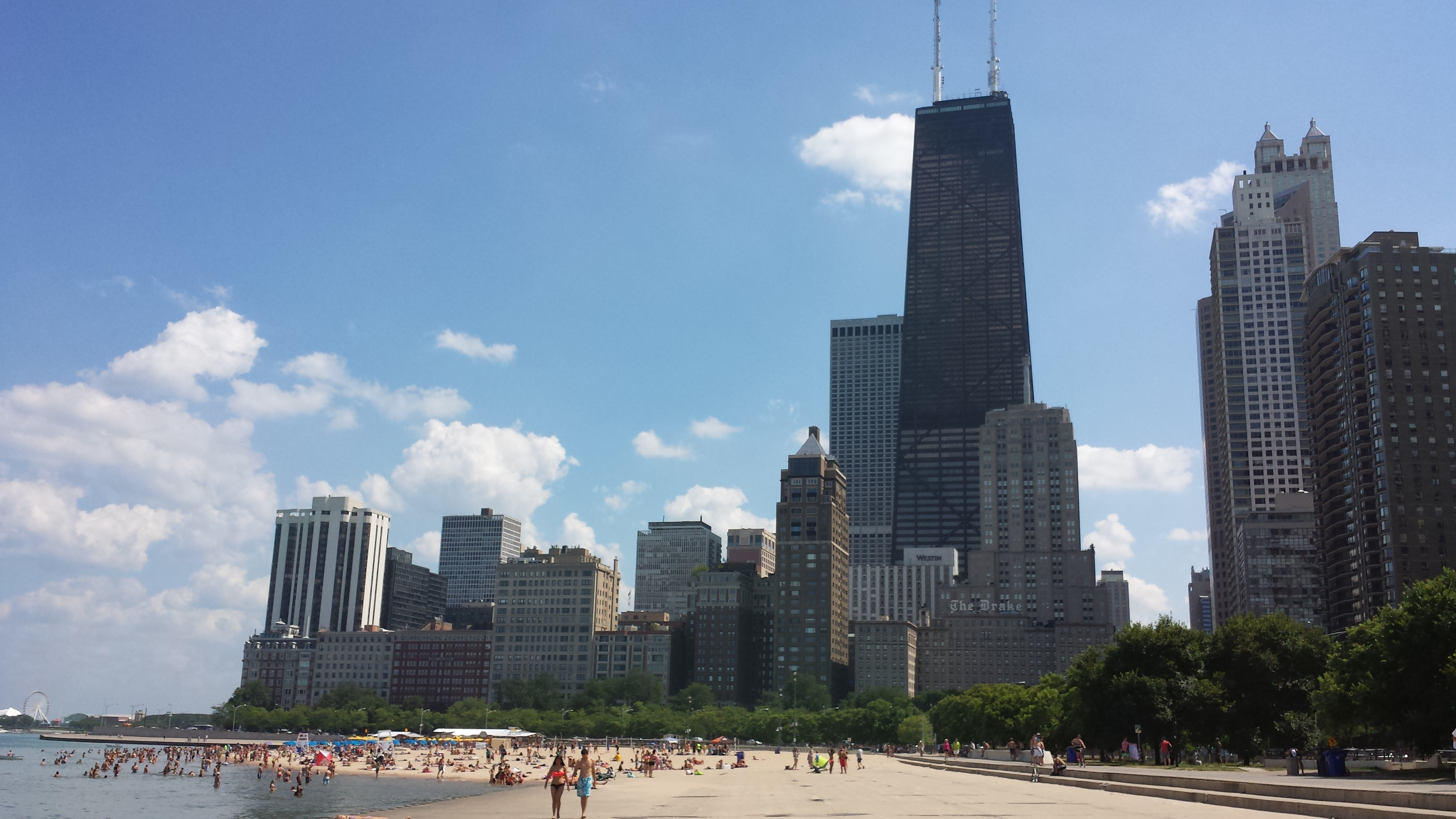
Oak Street Beach

== Wildlife ==
=== North Pond ===
Beaver in North Pond in 2014

The North Pond Nature Sanctuary (41°55′42″N 87°38′15″W), located between Fullerton, Diversey, Stockton and Cannon, is a ten-acre pond that has become an important wildlife area. Historically the site was a dune, then a dumping ground, and an ornamental pond; it was converted in 1999–2000 into a natural area with a littoral zone that greatly improved the water quality by re-establishing native Midwestern ecology. The upland restoration of prairie, savanna, and woodland plants has included only top quality native species such as little bluestem, sky-blue aster, nodding wild onion, side-oats grama, butterfly weed, purple prairie clover, rough blazing star, wild quinine, prairie phlox, coneflowers, false dragonhead, northern prairie dropseed, showy goldenrod, rattlesnake master, shooting star, and wild bergamot. The North Pond Nature Sanctuary is notable as the site where Mayor Richard M. Daley and the US Fish and Wildlife Service signed an Urban Conservation Treaty for Migratory Birds in April 2004, making the city eligible for federal funds to restore habitat for the lakefront migratory pathway for birds.

Restoration with native plants has drawn a great diversity of wildlife to this urban pond including many species of birds, turtles, frogs, and even a few beavers. Great blue herons, black-crowned night herons, green herons, mallards, wood ducks, song sparrows and woodpeckers can regularly be spotted at the North Pond Nature Sanctuary.

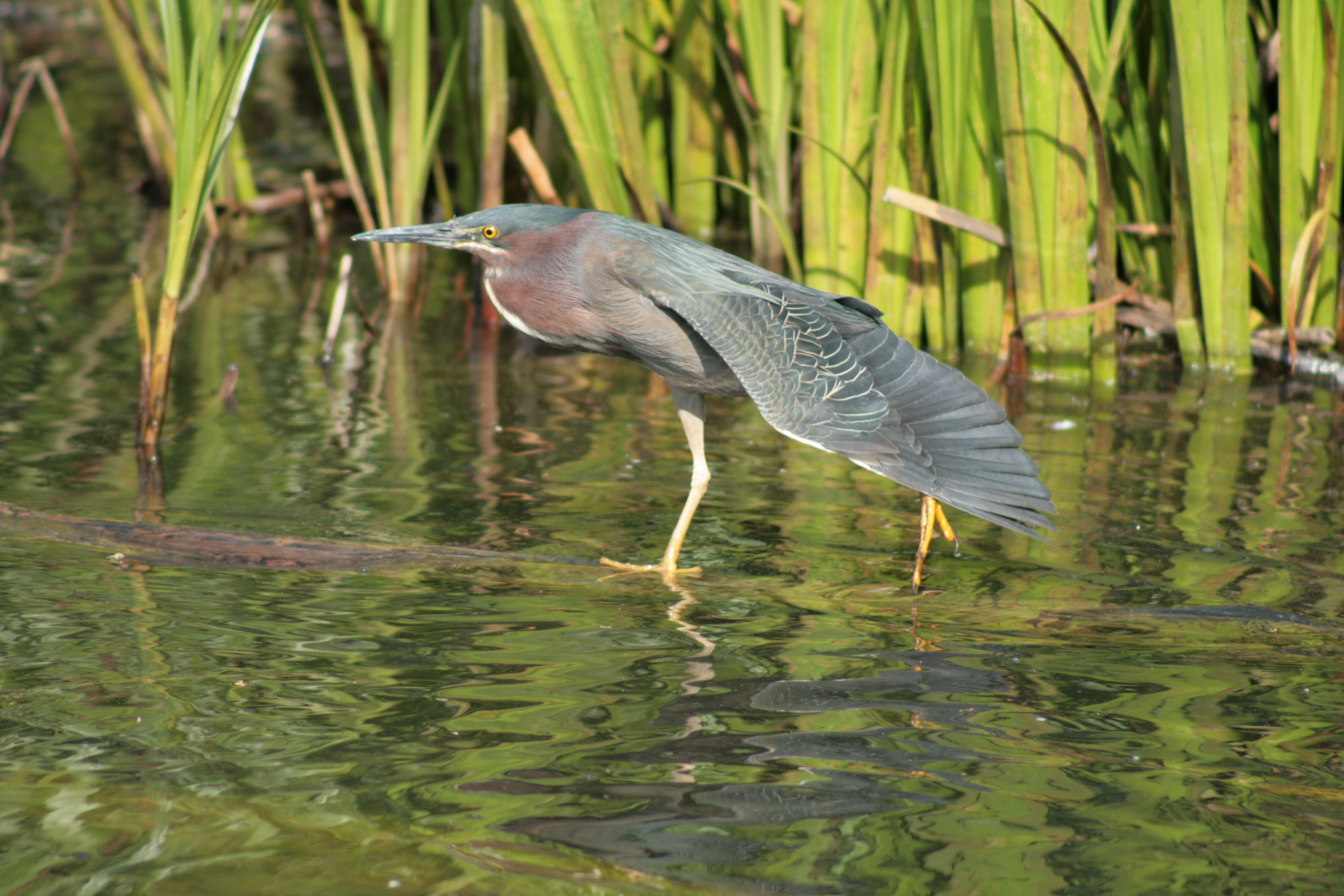
Green Heron

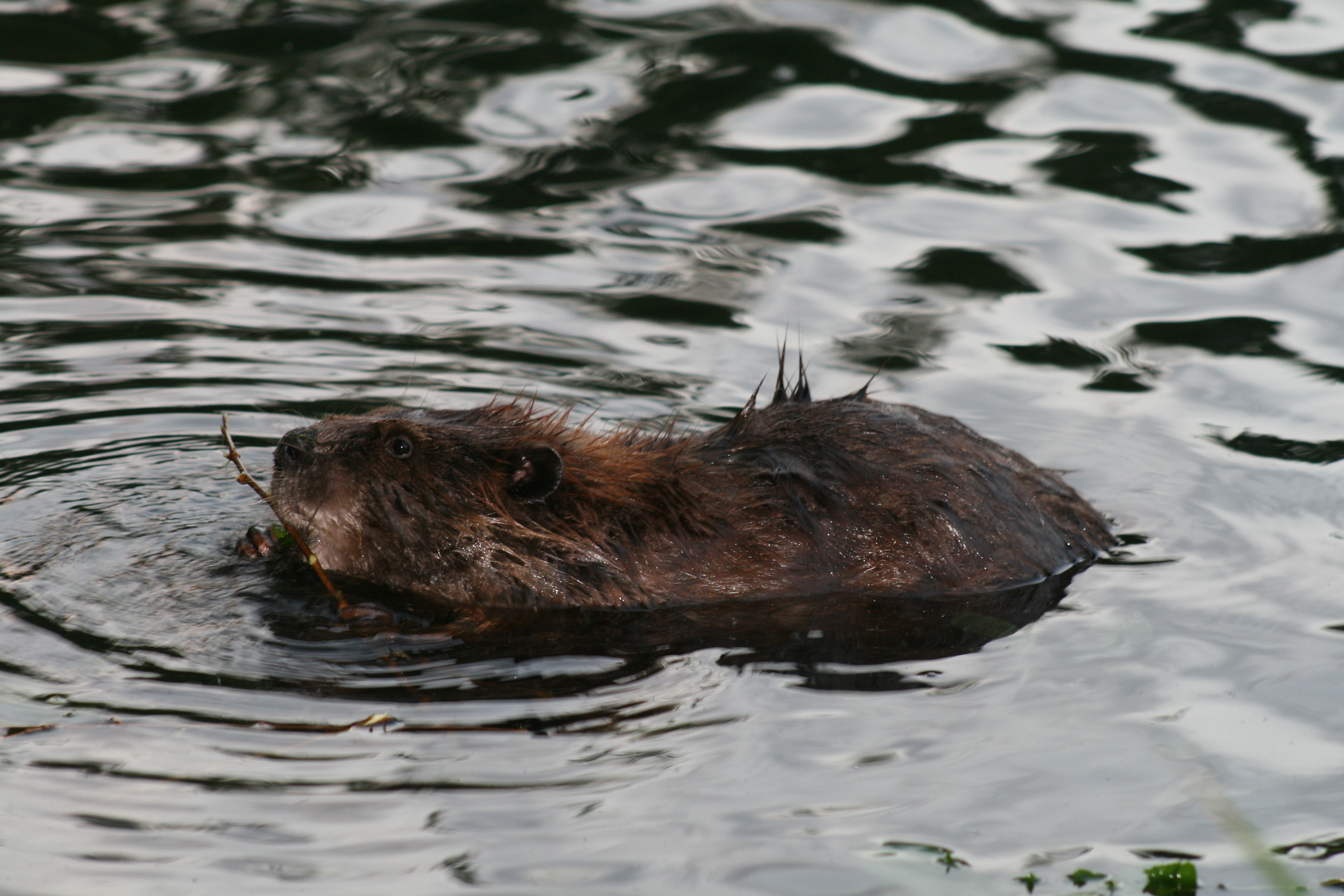
Beaver

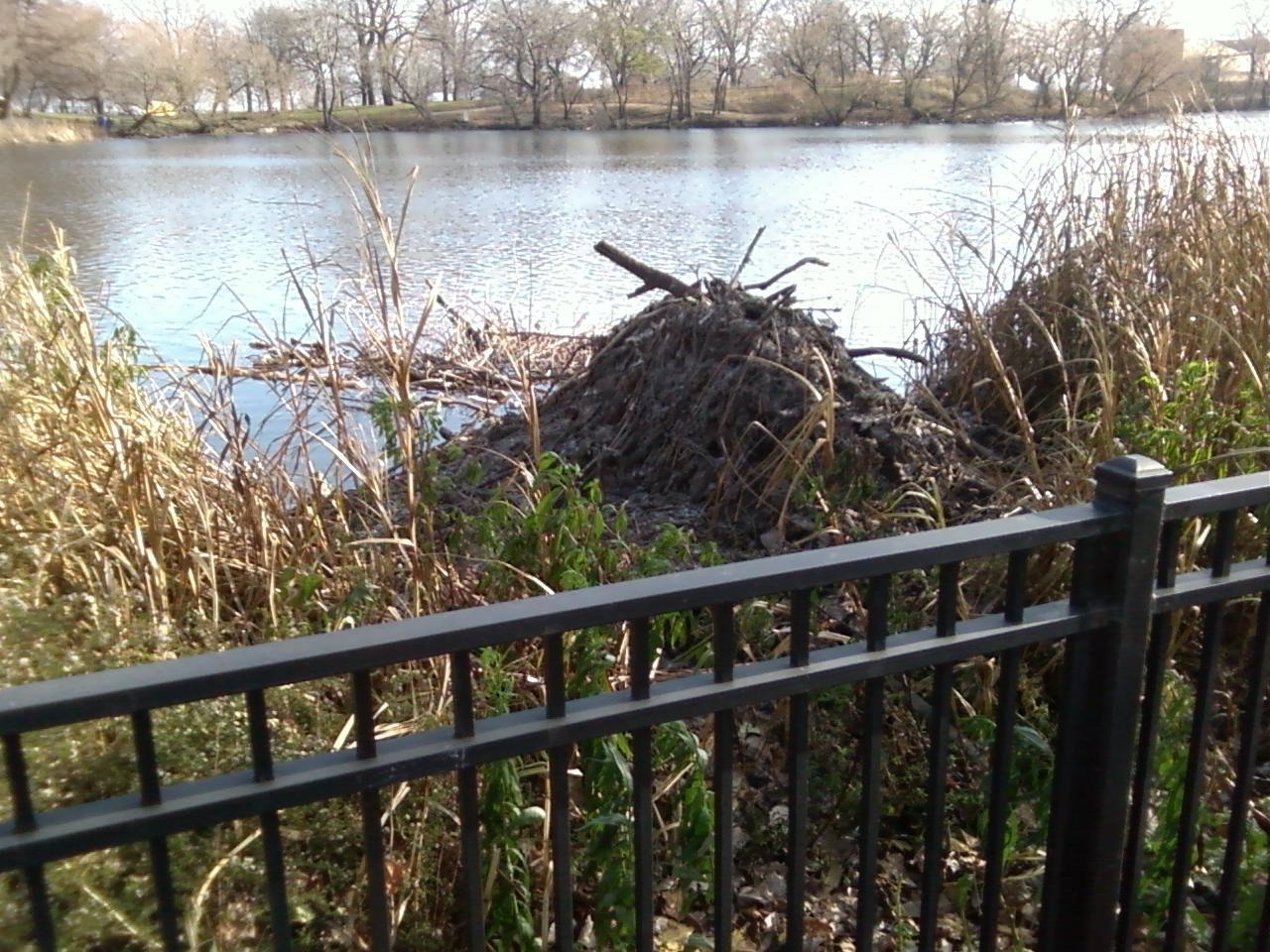
North Pond Beaver Lodge

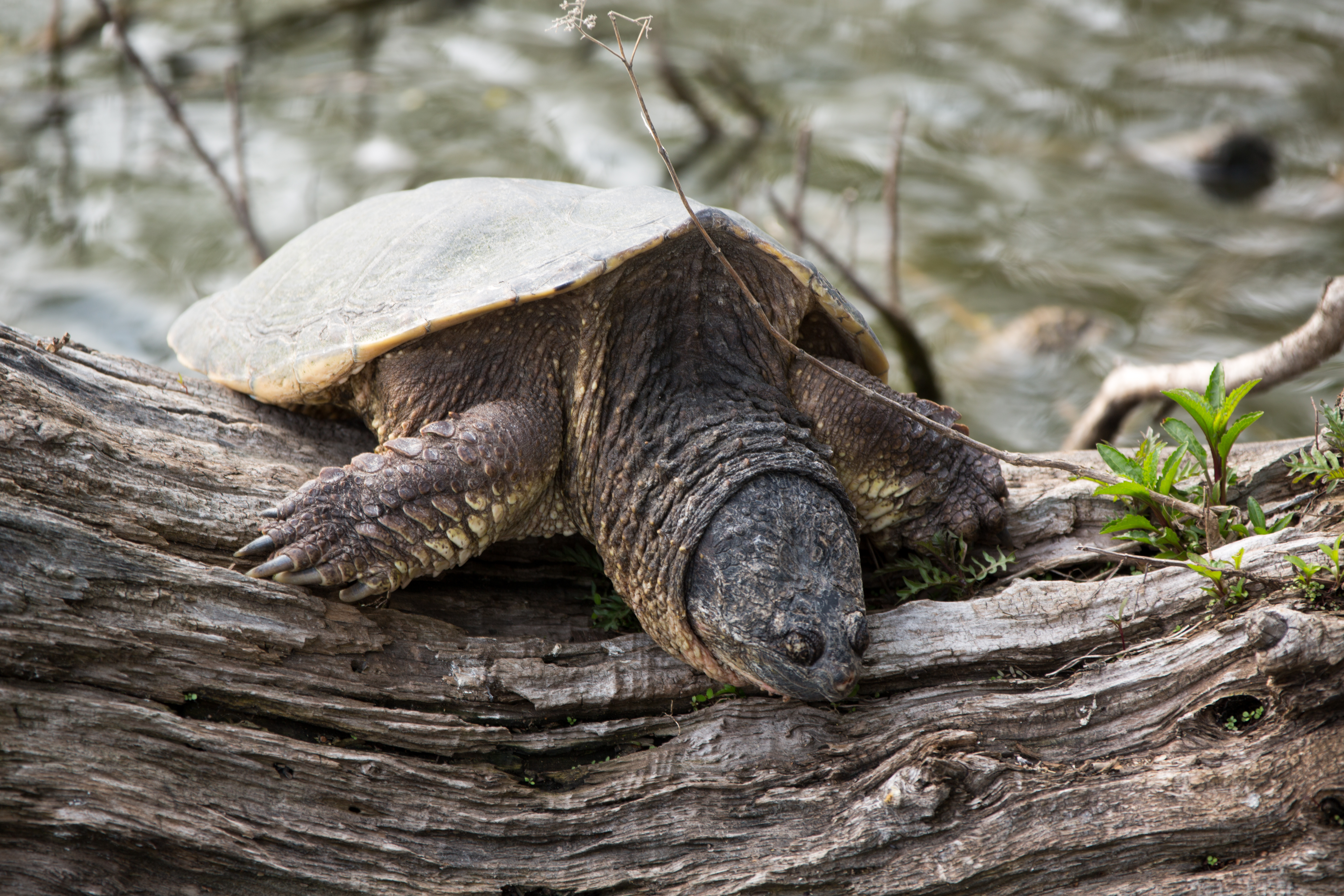
Snapping Turtle

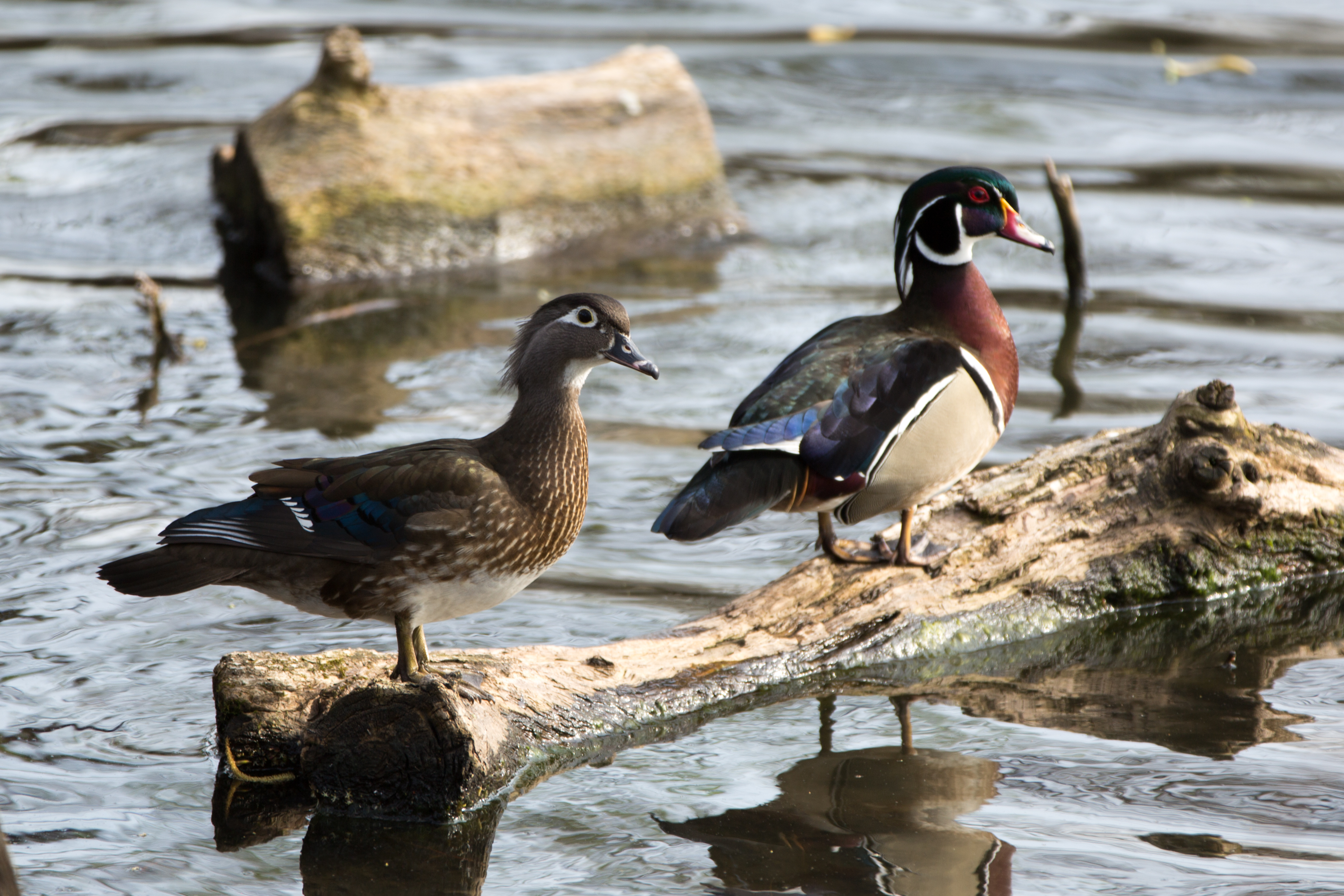
Wood Ducks

=== Animal sanctuaries ===
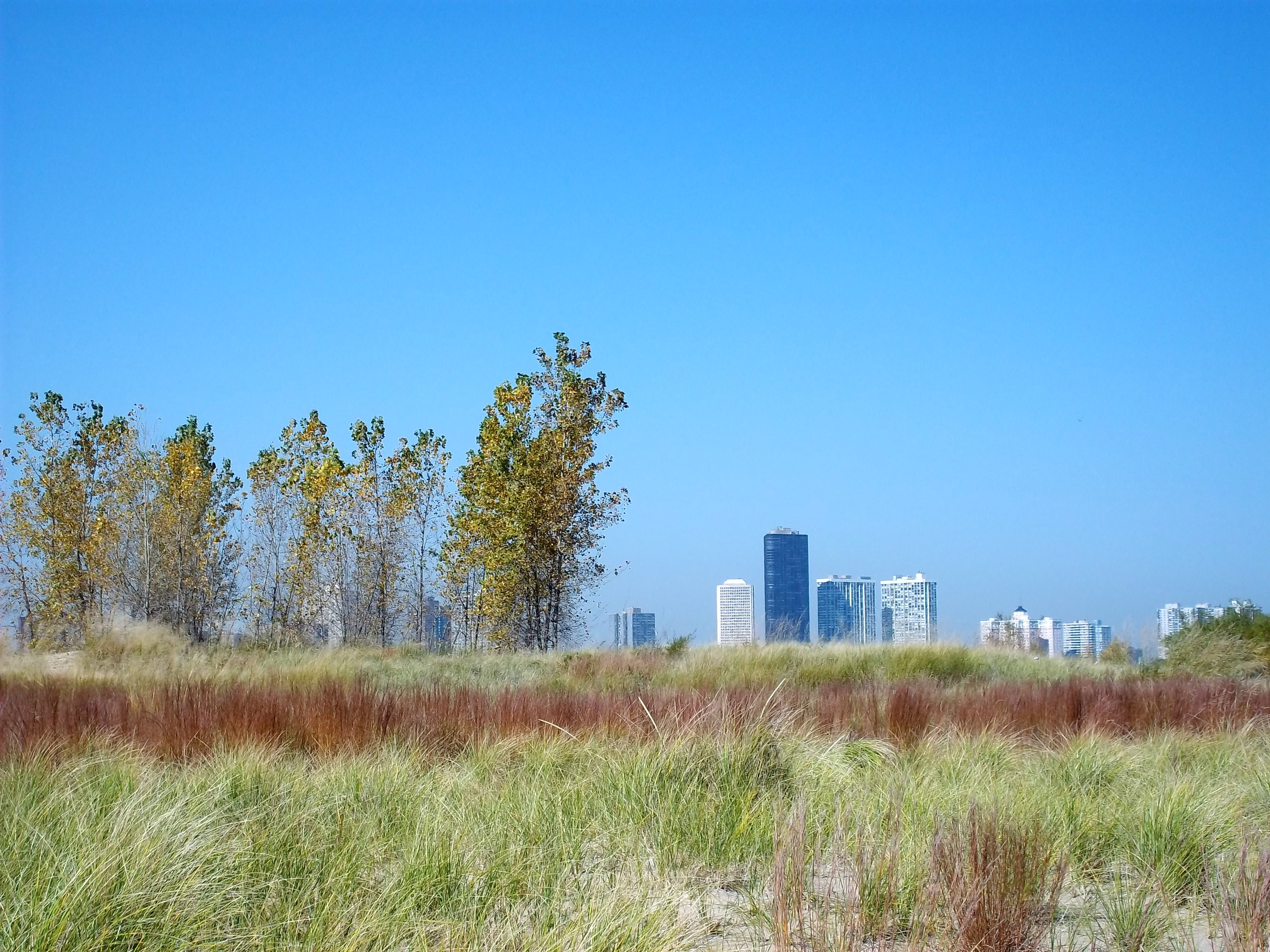
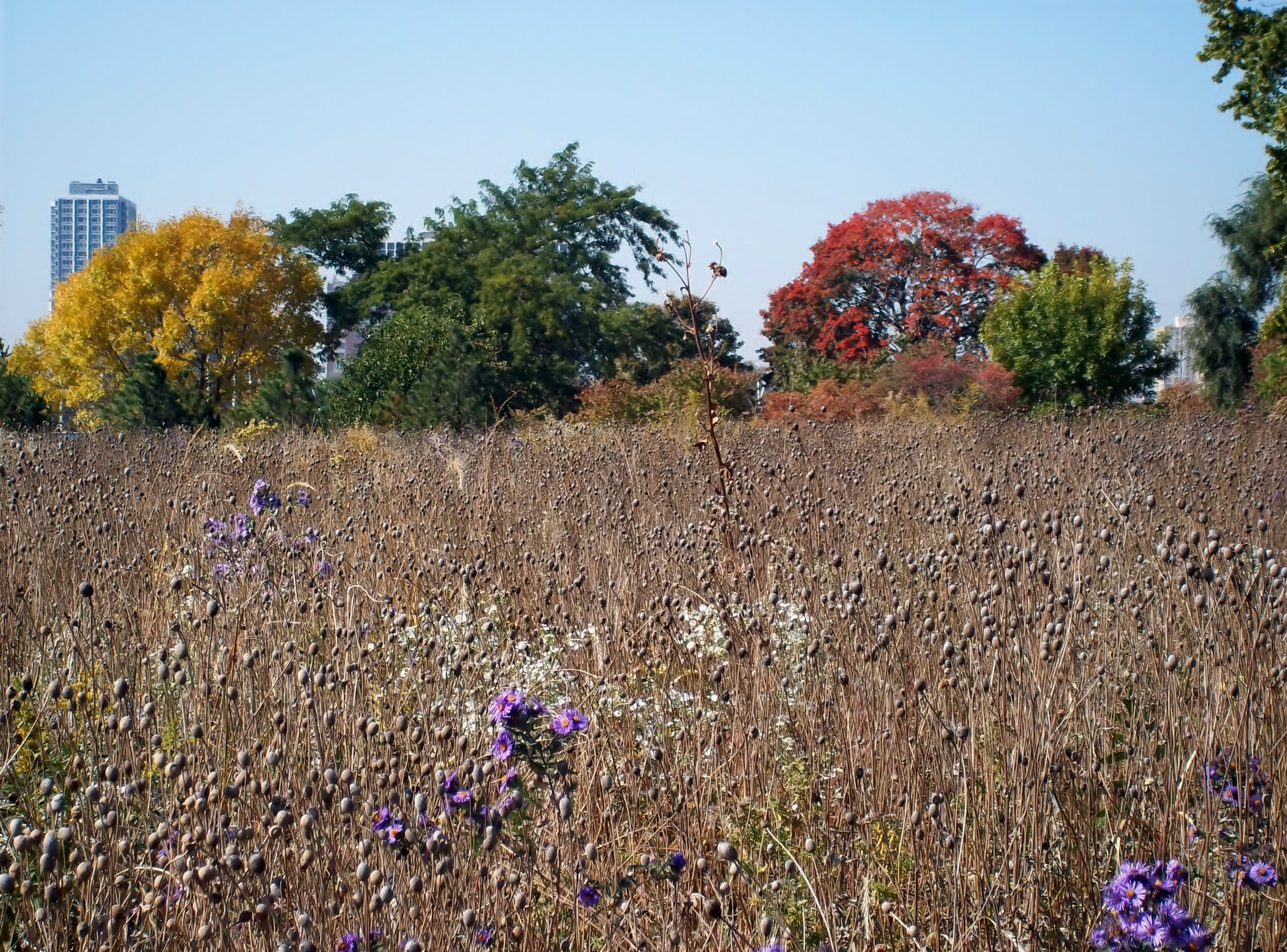
Lake dune and beach grass (left), and tallgrass prairie and woodland reserve (right), in Lincoln Park at Montrose Point, a former Nike missile base site turned nature reserve

Further north in the park, in the Lake View neighborhood (3600 N), there is the Bill Jarvis Migratory Bird Sanctuary (41°56′56″N 87°38′26″W; formerly, Lincoln Park Addison Migratory Bird Sanctuary). First landscaped and constructed with limited public access in the 1920s, under the leadership of the Chicago Academy of Sciences, its spring is supplied with city water to mimic a natural lake marsh environment, with attendant forest and meadow environments. Most of its 7-acre (2.8 ha) area is entirely fenced around to preserve the habitat from human encroachment. Instead, a nature trail and a viewing platform are at its surrounding perimeter. During the 1940s, its Park District caretakers lost funding and the site was padlocked. In 1968, the entire site was almost bulldozed for golf course development but its Lake View neighbors, including Bill Jarvis, led a successful campaign to save and restore it. Today it hosts more than 150 species of birds, including six species of herons, like the black crowned night heron; wood ducks; woodcock; hawks; yellow-billed cuckoos; hummingbirds; thrushes; vireos; 34 species of warblers; and 18 native species of sparrows. In addition, small mammals such as rabbit, opossum, raccoon, and occasionally fox and coyote make their home there.

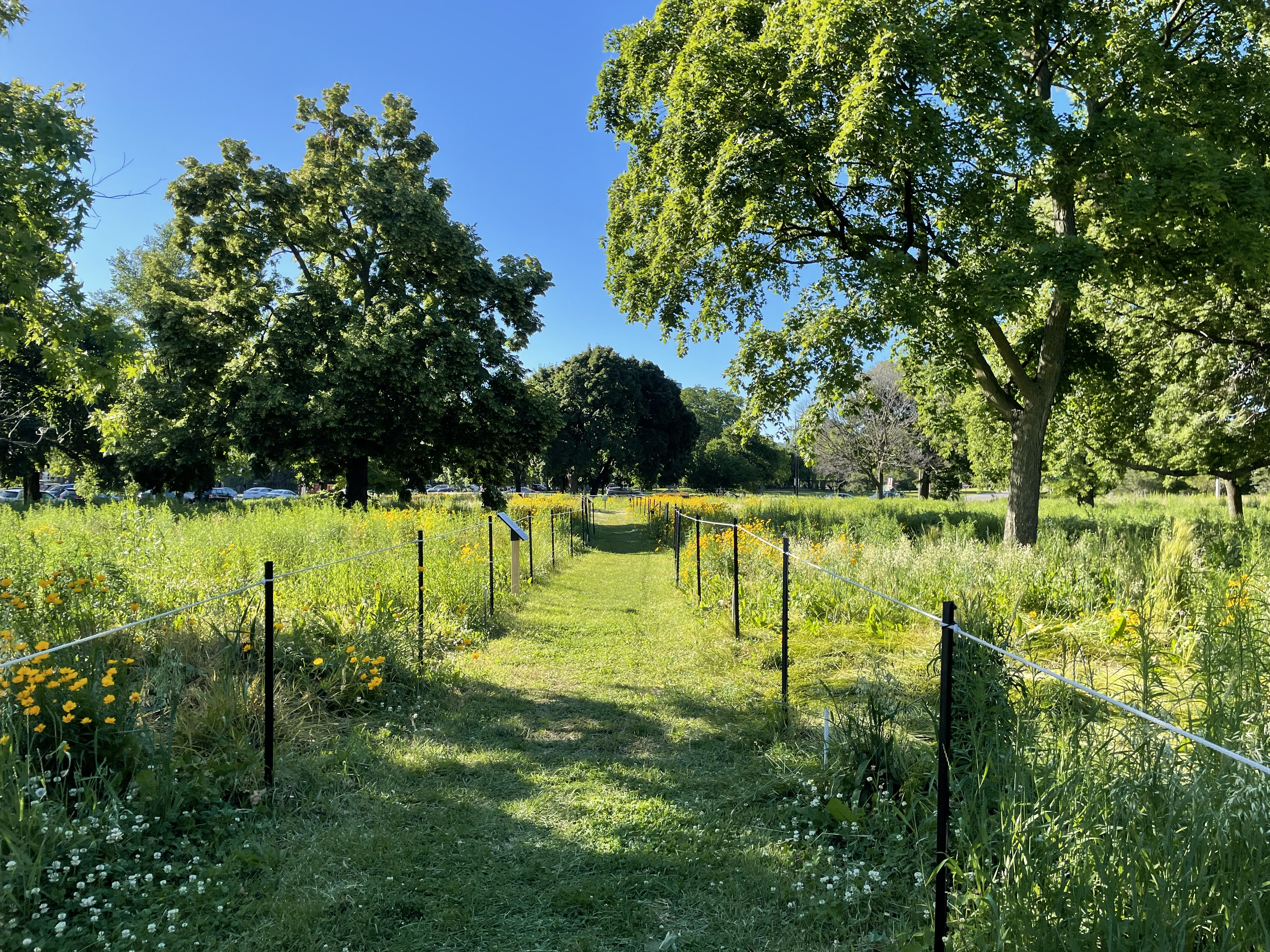
Uptown Natural Area

In the Uptown neighborhood (4400 N; 41°57′48″N 87°38′00″W), there is the 15-acre (6.1 ha) Montrose Point Bird Sanctuary (including "The Magic Hedge"). During the Cold War, Montrose point, which juts out into Lake Michigan, was used by the United States Army as a Nike missile base. The Army camouflaged their missile launchers and barracks behind honeysuckle hedges. When the Army left in the 1970s, bird watchers noticed how the honeysuckle attracted birds. They successfully lobbied the park district for a new preserve. After extensive replanting, the site supports woodland, tall prairie, and lake dune habitat that annually attracts tens of thousands of migratory birds of more than 300 different species. The Uptown Natural Area, opened in 2022, features nature trails through six acres of native prairie and savanna.

== Public art ==
Lincoln Park is known for its statuary, being referred to as "Chicago's outdoor Statuary Hall" by WBEZ. Abraham Lincoln: The Man is a famous standing Lincoln statue in Lincoln Park by Augustus Saint-Gaudens, the same sculptor who created Abraham Lincoln: The Head of State in Grant Park. Replicas of Lincoln Park's Standing Lincoln can be found at Lincoln's tomb, Springfield and in Parliament Square, London. The statue is located at Dearborn Street and North Avenue. It was fully restored in 1989 by the Lincoln Park Conservancy's Adopt-A-Monument Program, and 8,200 square feet of formal gardens were added in front of the monument.

The only other person memorialized in statue in both Grant and Lincoln parks is Alexander Hamilton; the statue of Hamilton was sculpted by John Angel. Just as there is an Abraham Lincoln statue in Grant Park, there is a large memorial to Ulysses S. Grant in Lincoln Park overlooking Cannon Drive. The sculpture was created in 1891 by Louis Rebisso.

The statue of Hans Christian Andersen by Johannes Gelert (1896) on Stockton Drive near Webster Avenue provides a tribute to the Danish storyteller. The Eugene Field Memorial (1922) designed by Edward McCartan remembers the Chicago Daily News columnist and poet who wrote "Little Boy Blue" and "Winken, Blinken, and Nod". William Ordway Partridge's statue of William Shakespeare (1894) provides a third great story-teller in Lincoln Park. This seated Shakespeare includes a lap for children to climb onto. A bust of Sir Georg Solti, a conductor of the Chicago Symphony Orchestra, was also situated in the Lincoln Park Conservatory's formal garden until its relocation to Grant Park in 2006. Statues honoring the German poets Johann Wolfgang von Goethe and Friedrich Schiller can also be found in Lincoln Park. The large Goethe statue is located near Diversey Parkway and Stockton Drive. The smaller Schiller statue is located near the western entrance to the zoo. Cyrus Edwin Dallin's 1890 A Signal of Peace is exhibited at the park.

At Addison Street stands a 40-foot (12-meter) totem pole depicting Kwanusila the Thunderbird. A statue of John Peter Altgeld (1915), the nineteenth-century Illinois Governor who pardoned the men convicted in the Haymarket affair bombing, can be seen just south of Diversey. This statue was created by Gutzon Borglum and unveiled on September 6 (Labor Day), 1915.

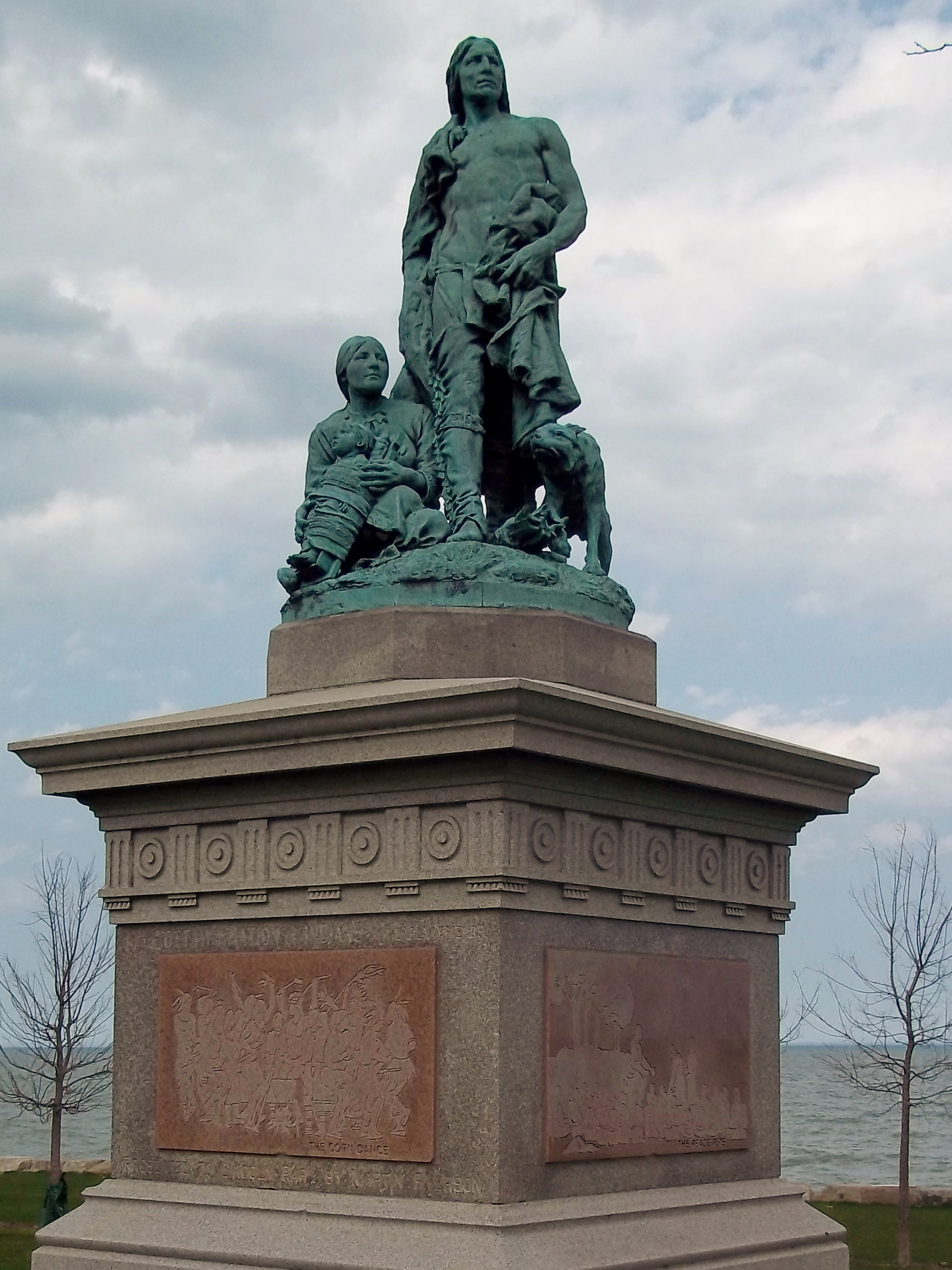
The Alarm

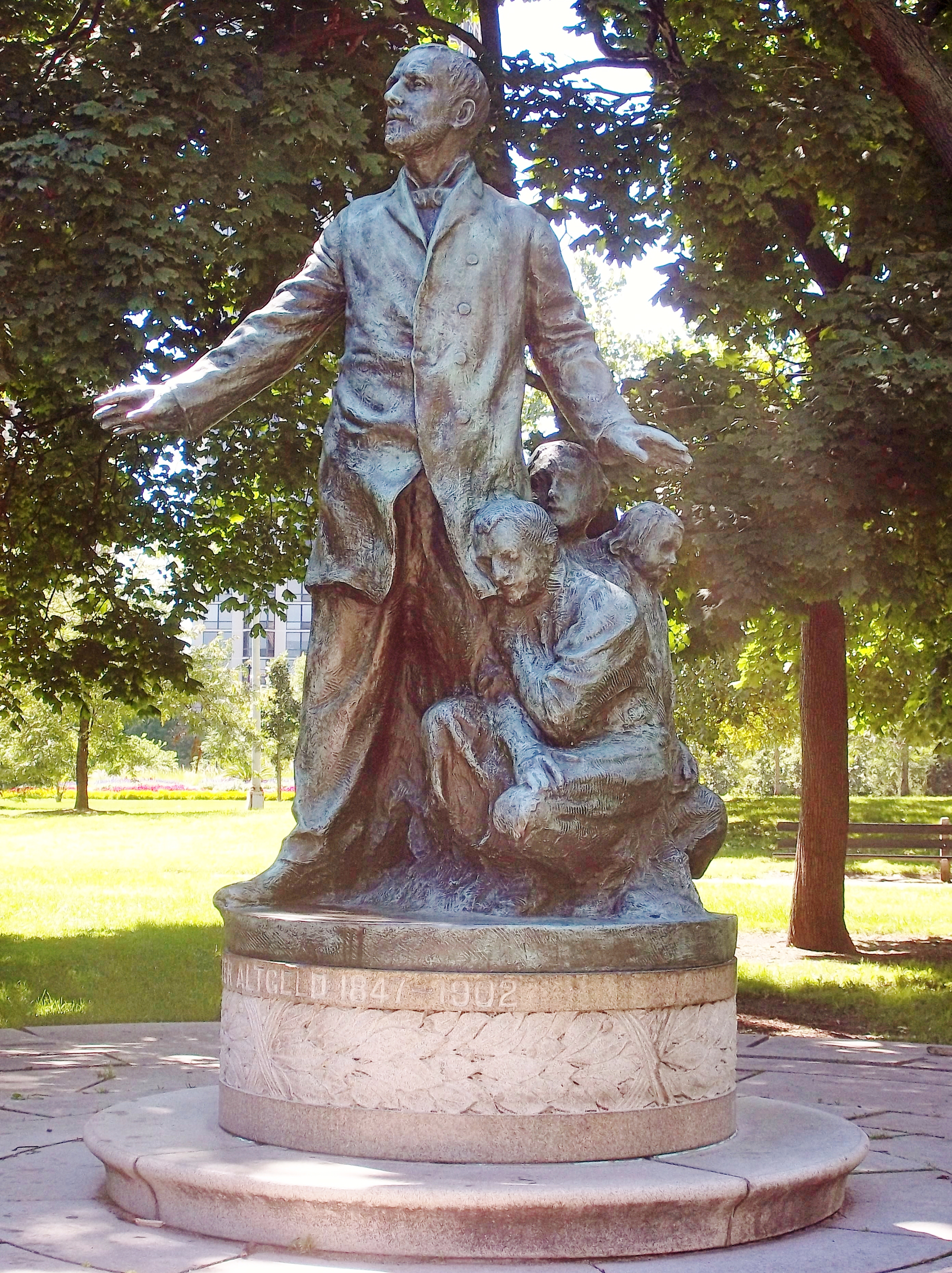
Statue of John Peter Altgeld

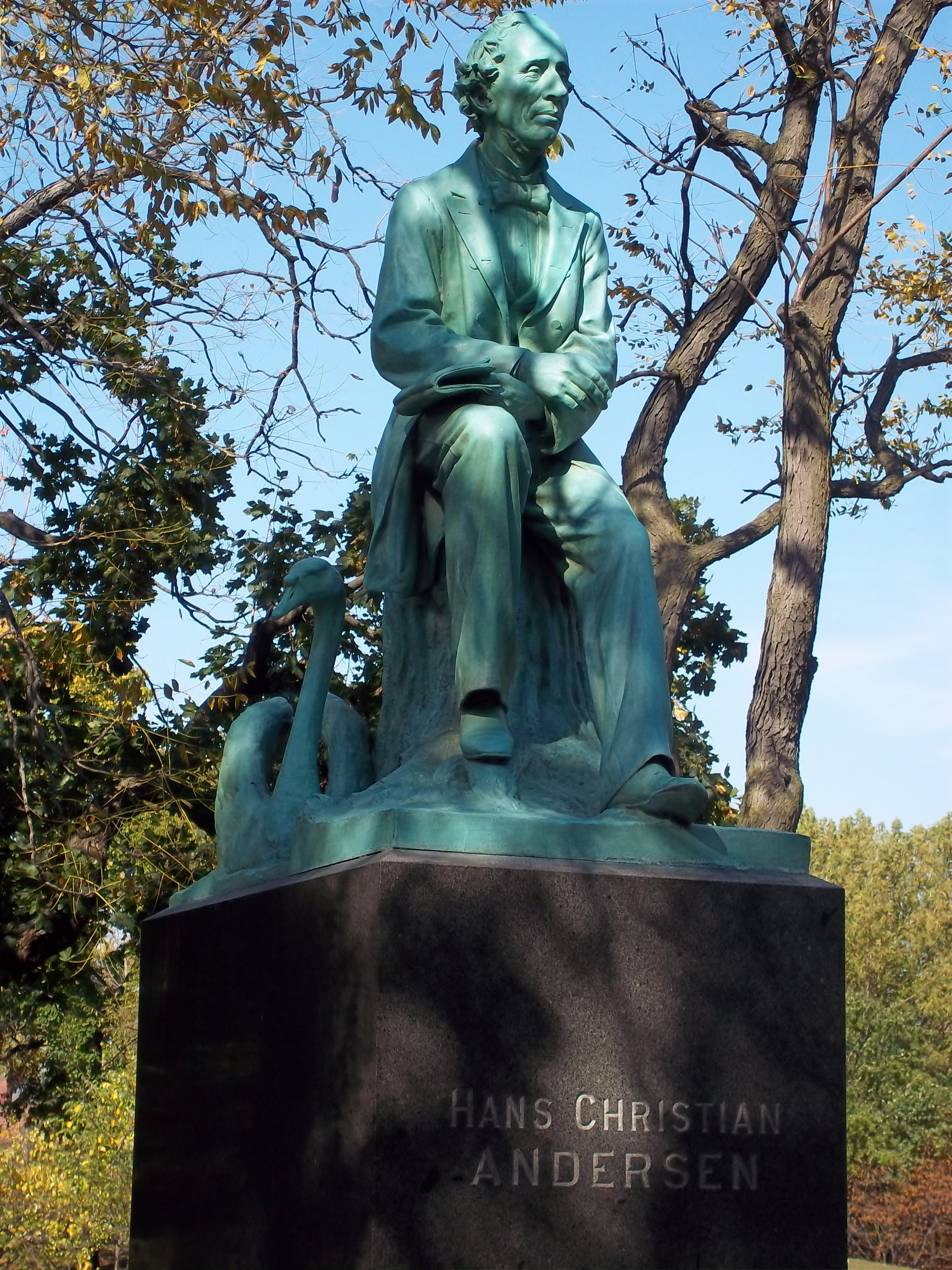
Hans Christian Andersen

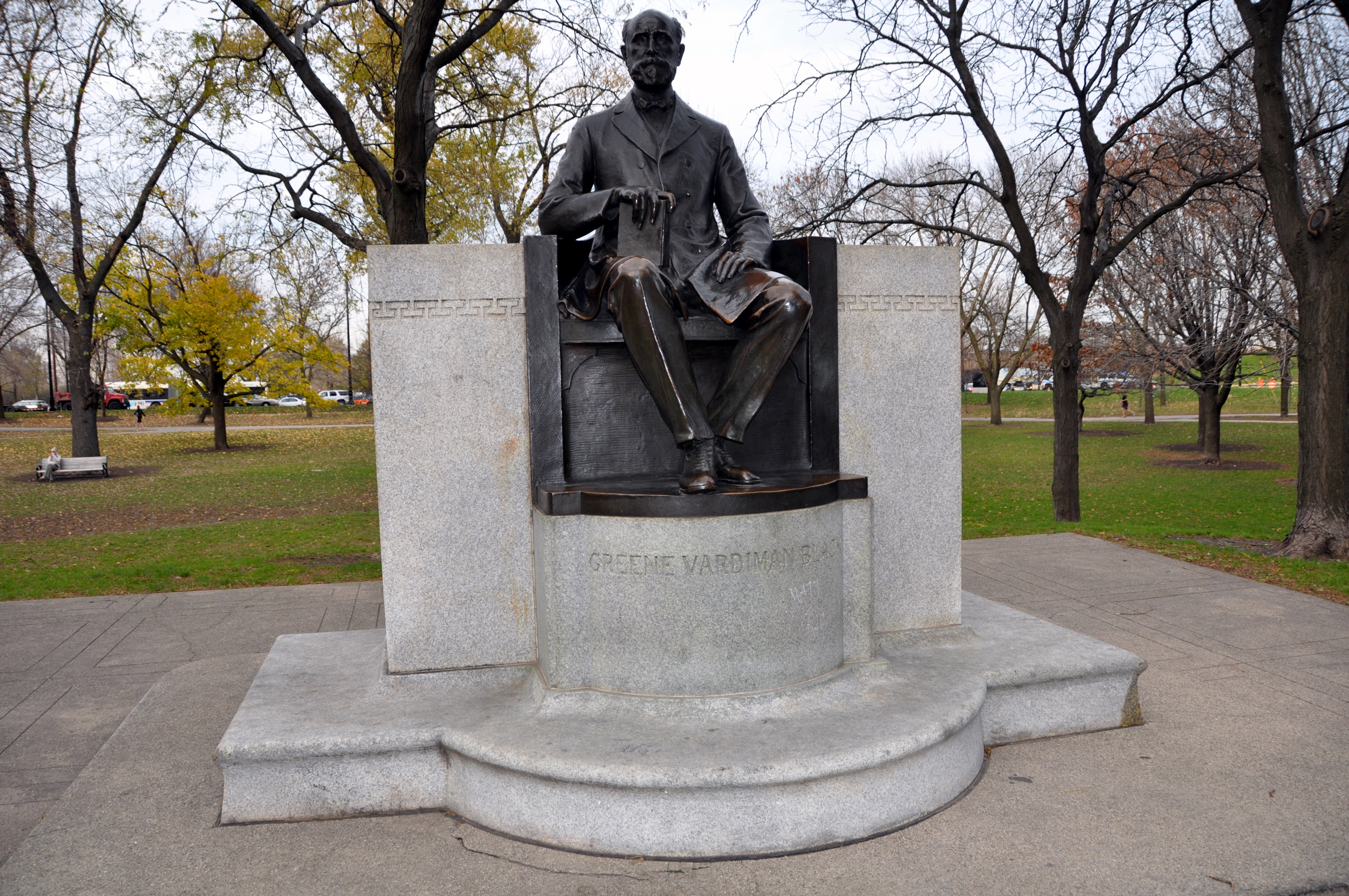
Greene Vardiman Black

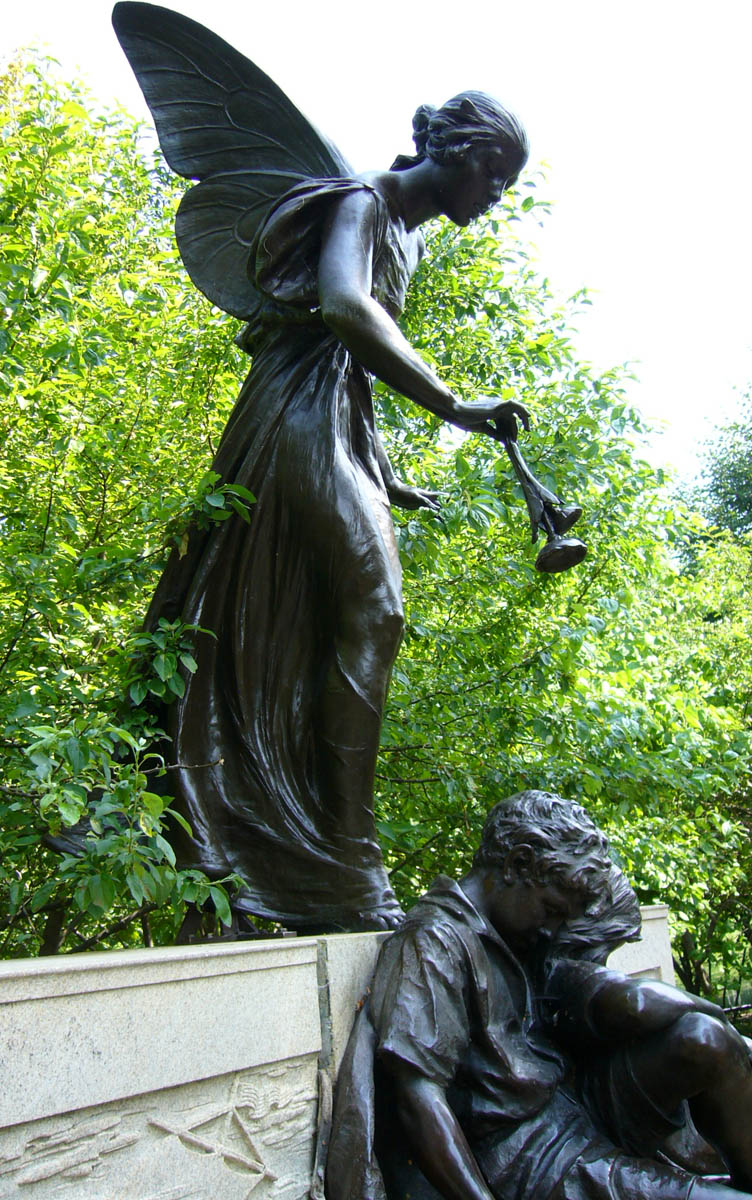
Dream Lady, Eugene Field Memorial

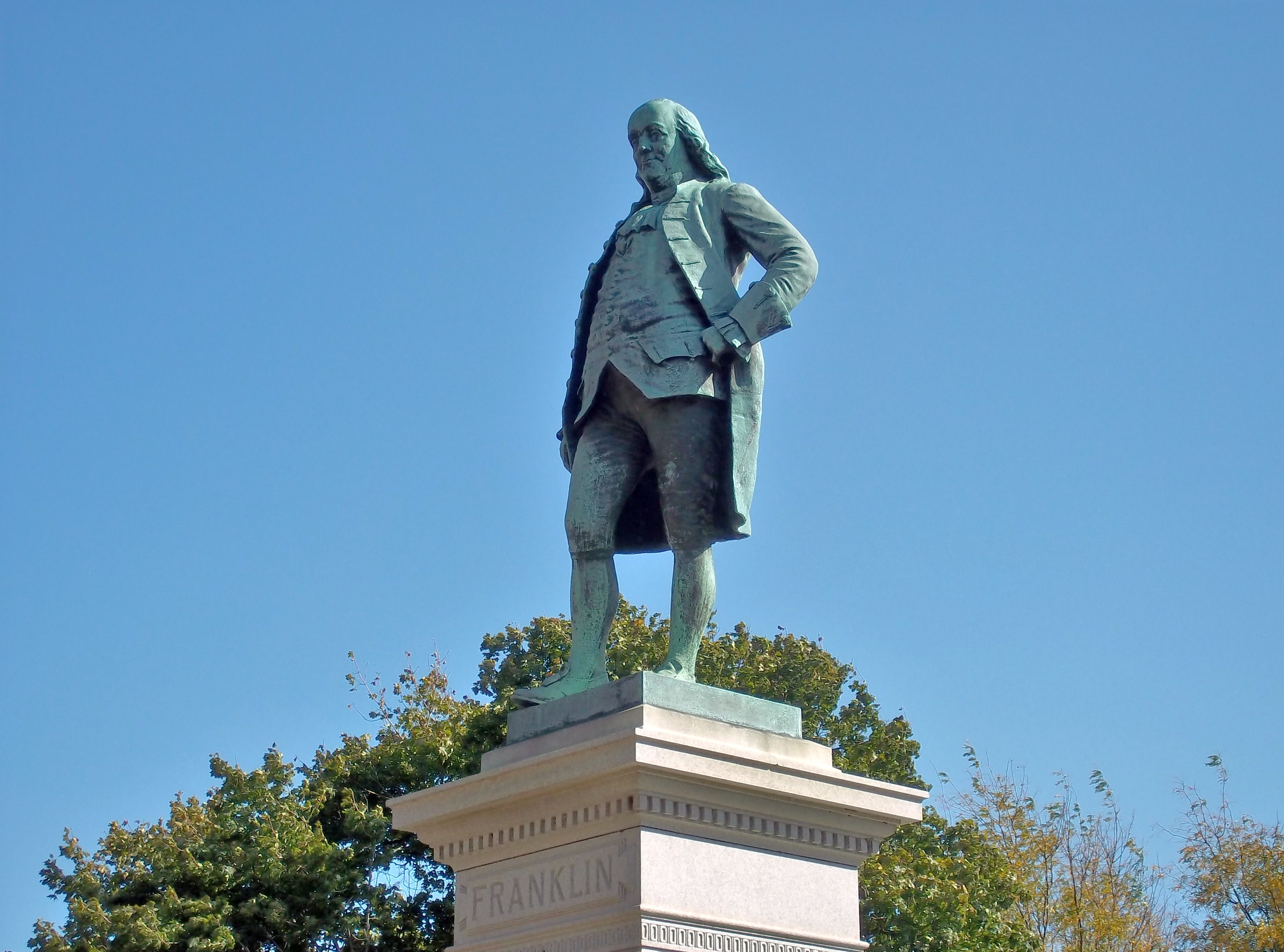
Statue of Benjamin Franklin

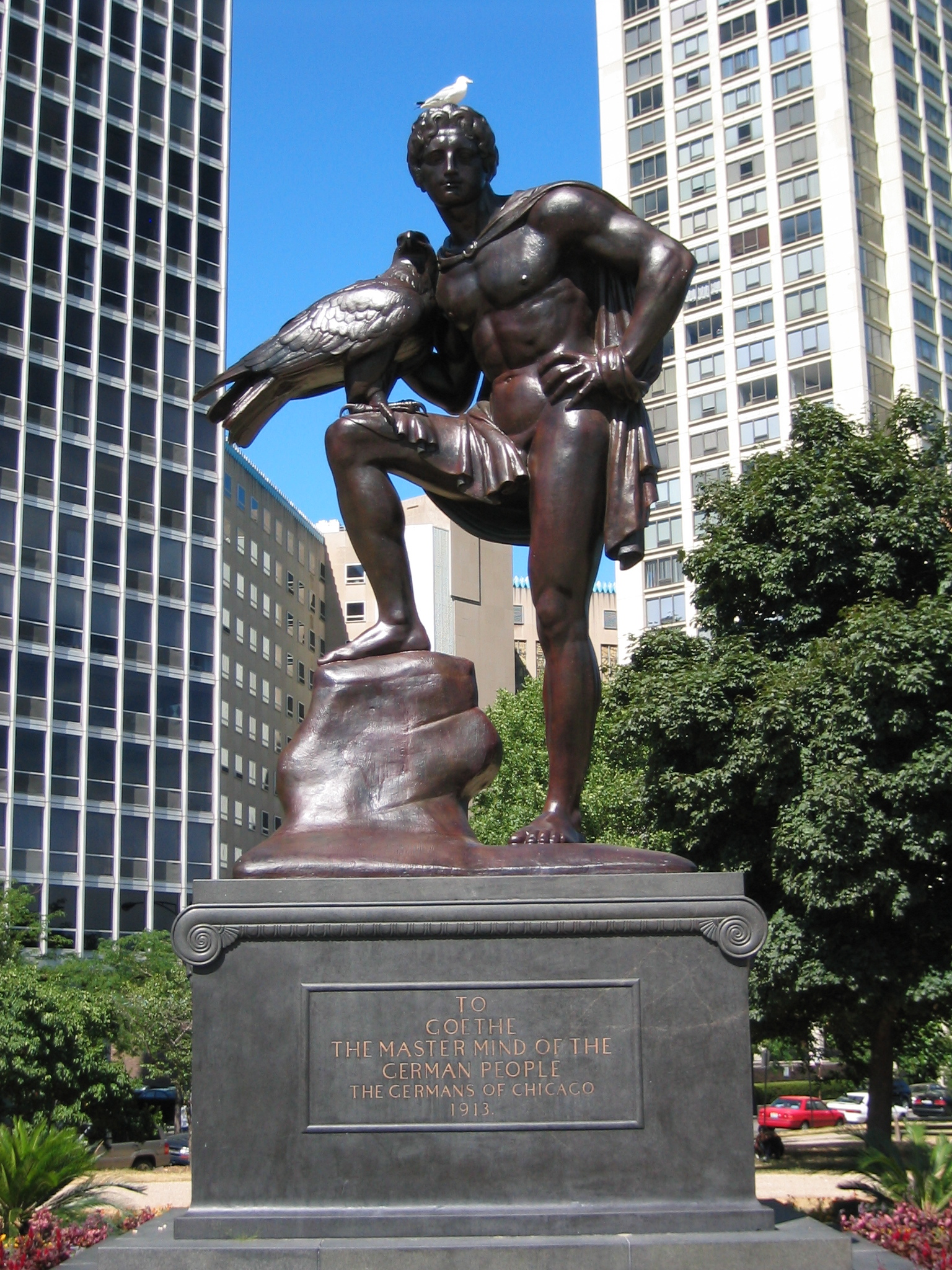
Goethe Monument

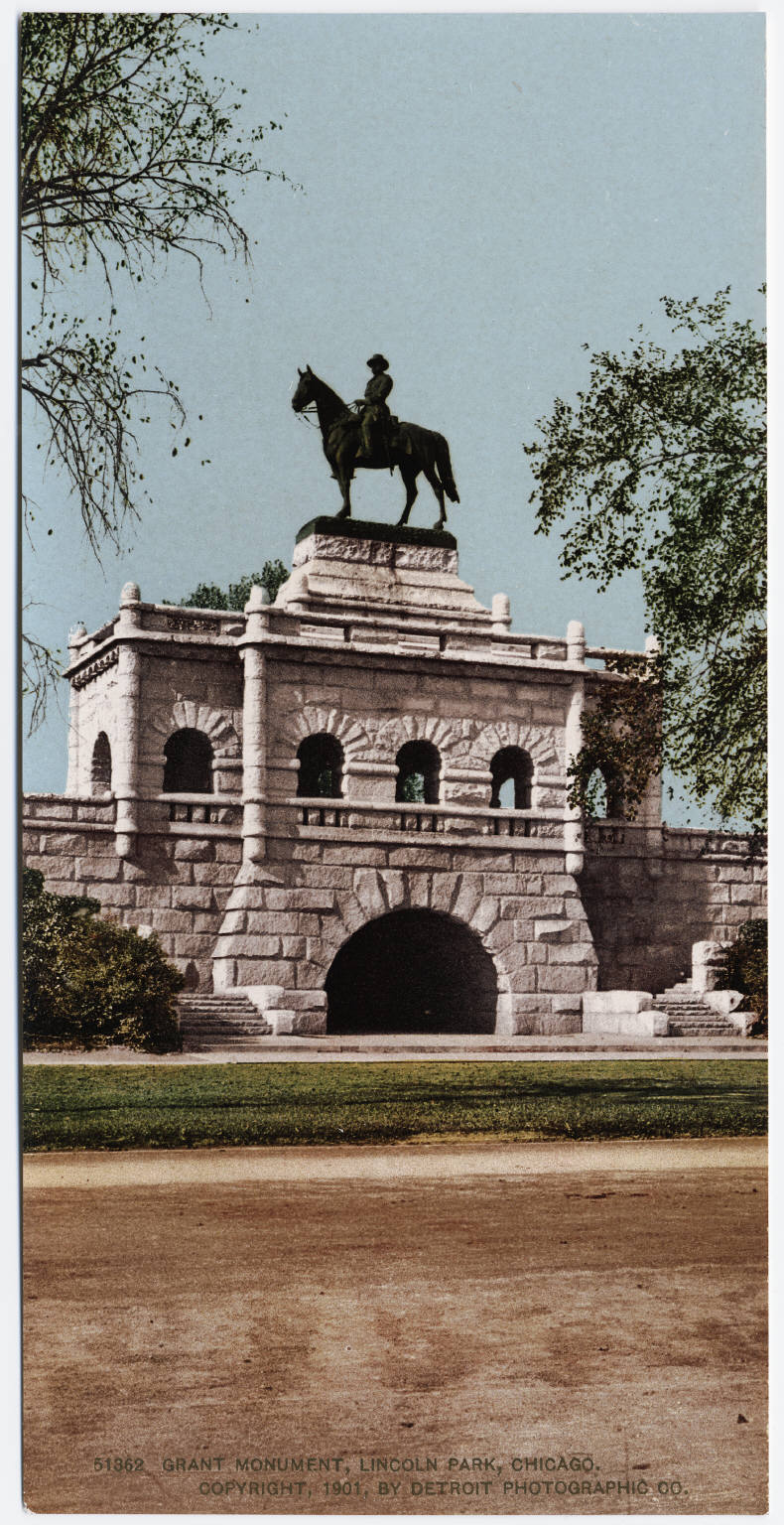
Ulysses S. Grant Monument (Photochrom of the ca. 1901)

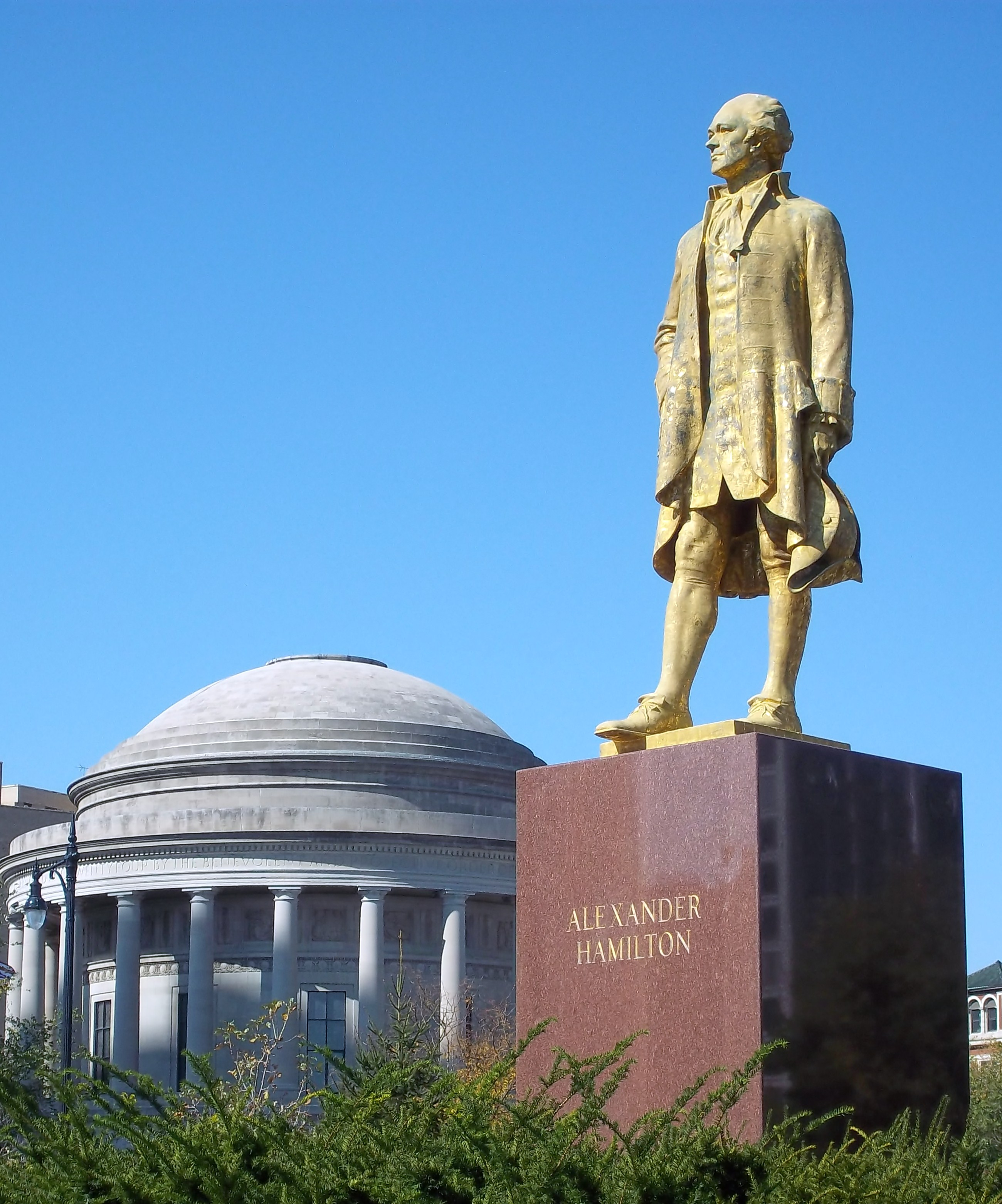
Statue of Alexander Hamilton

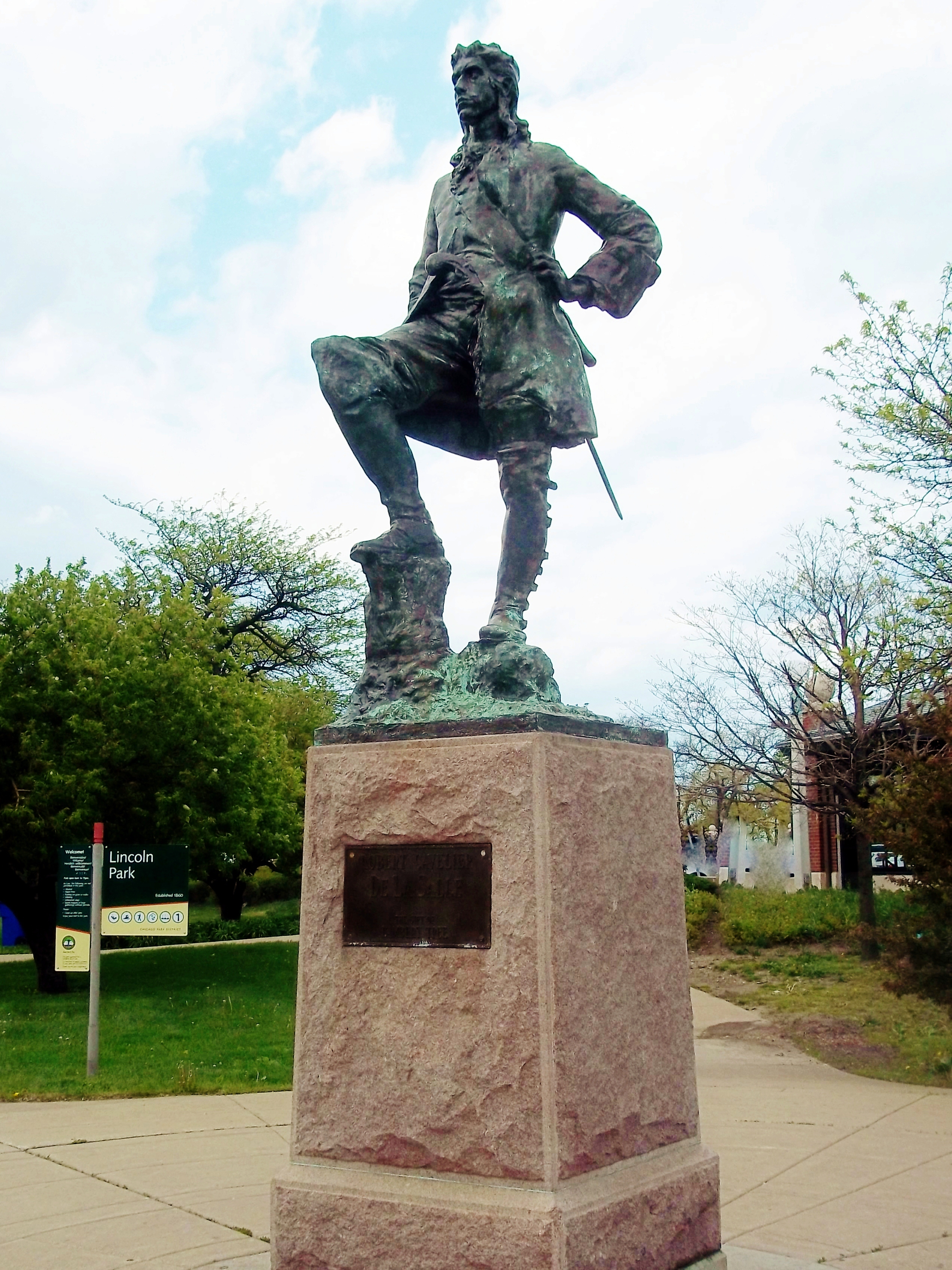
Statue of René-Robert Cavelier, Sieur de La Salle

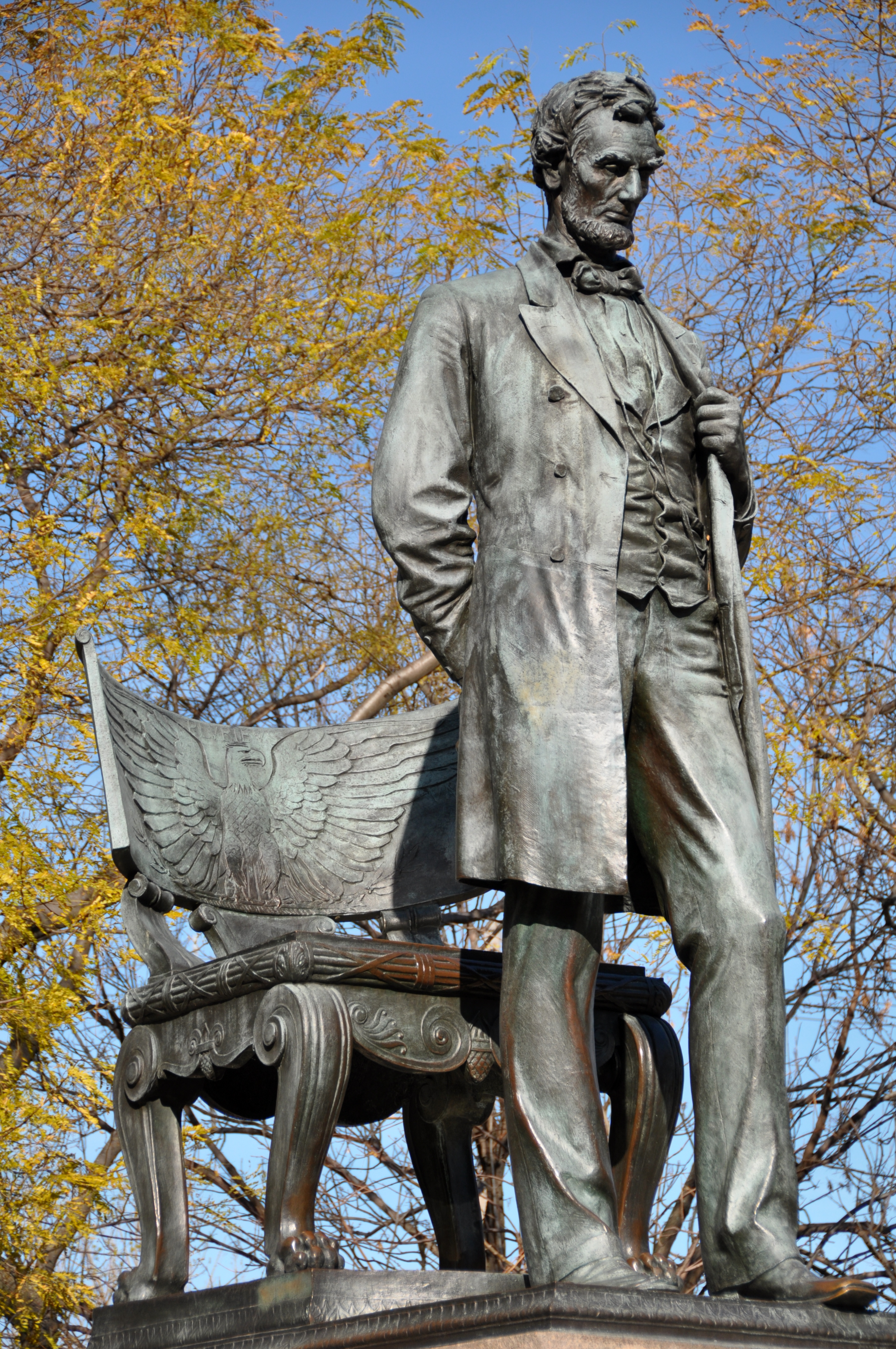
Abraham Lincoln – Standing Lincoln after Lincoln Park Conservancy restoration

Statue of Friedrich Schiller in the Lincoln Park Conservatory formal garden

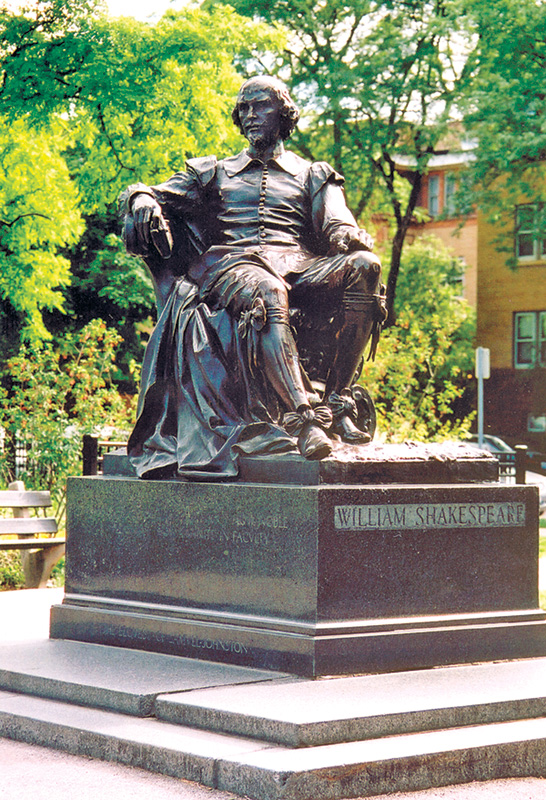
Statue of William Shakespeare in the Lincoln Park Conservatory's Grandmother's Garden

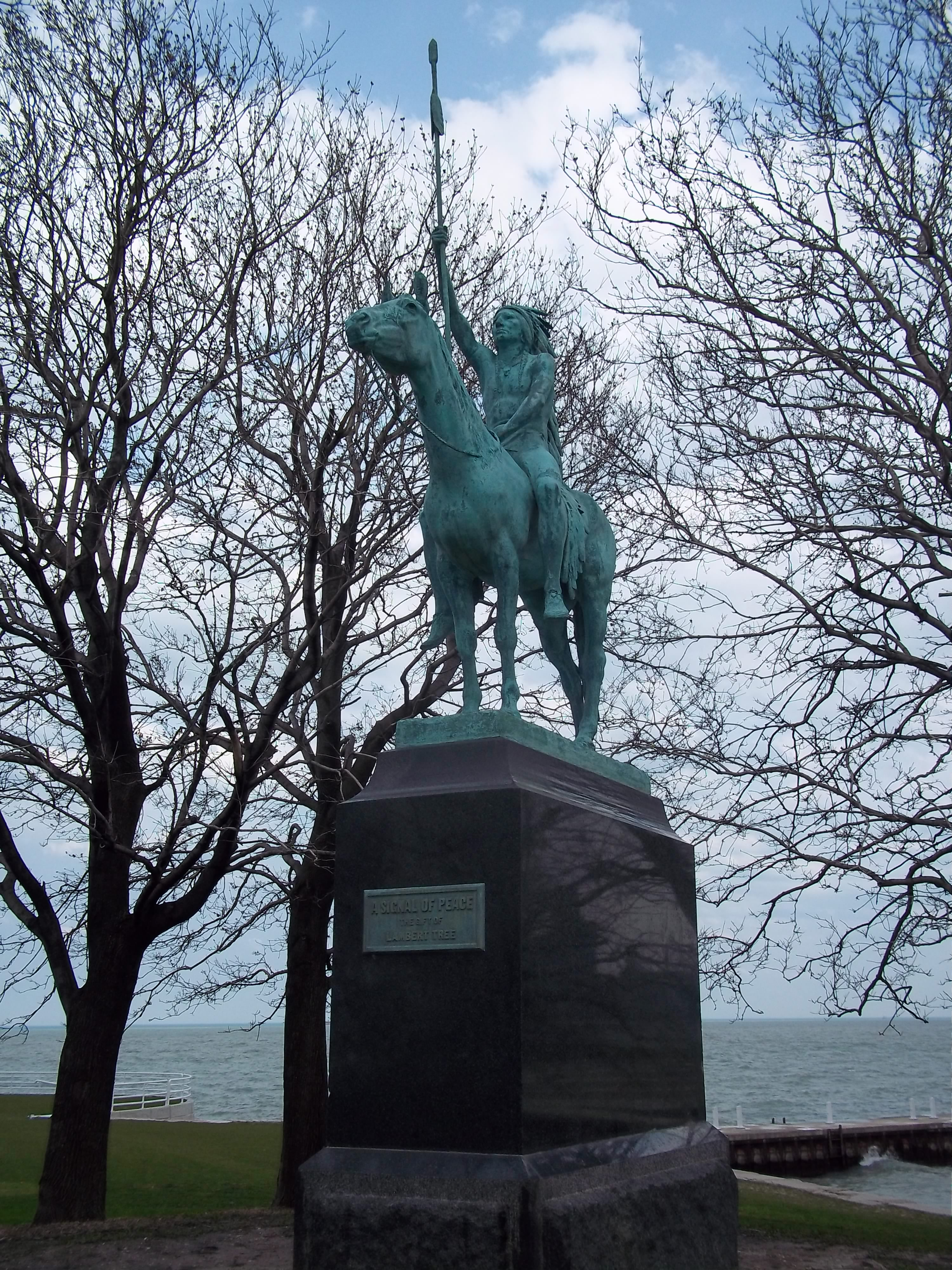
A Signal of Peace

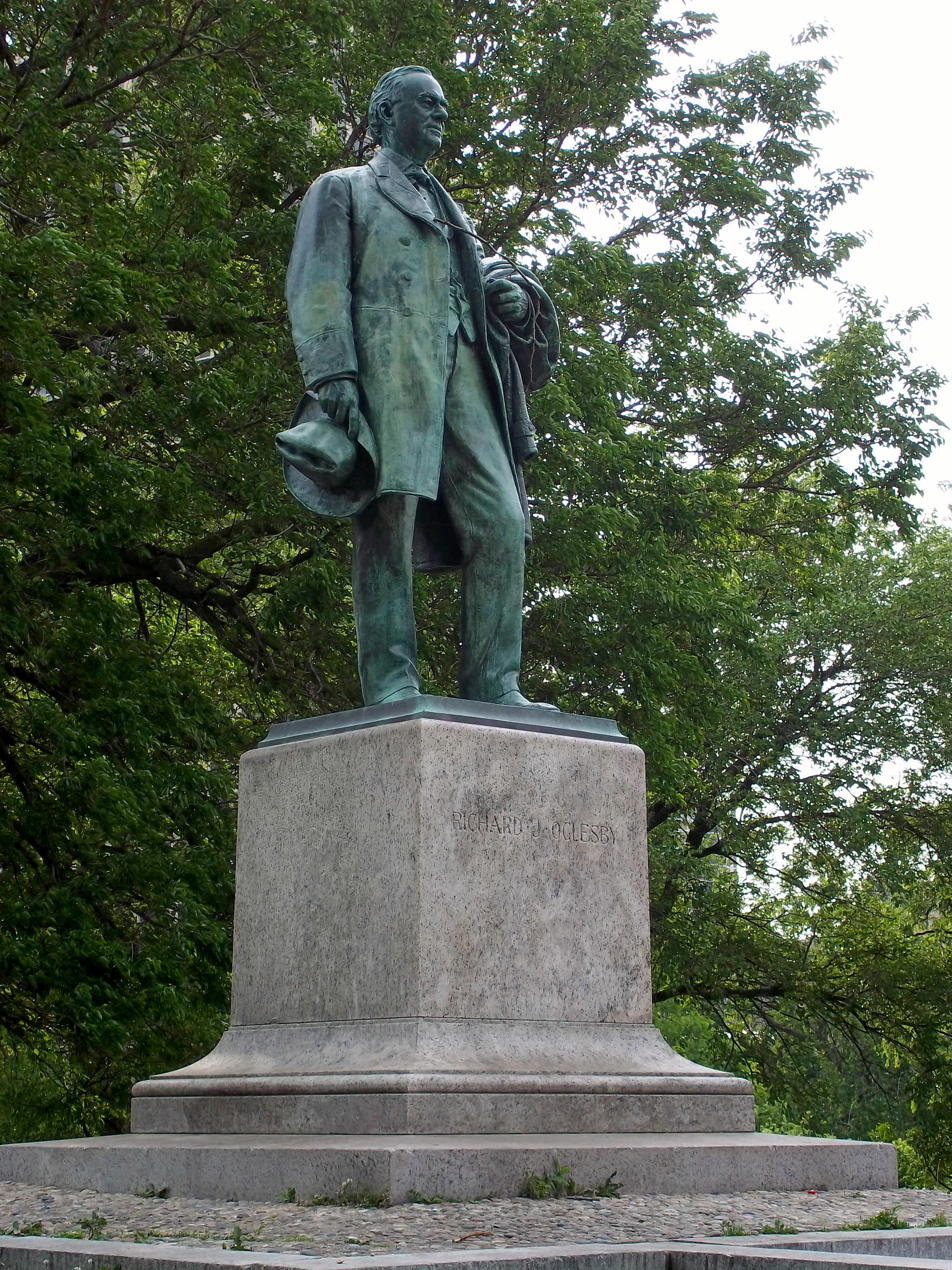
Statue of Richard J. Oglesby

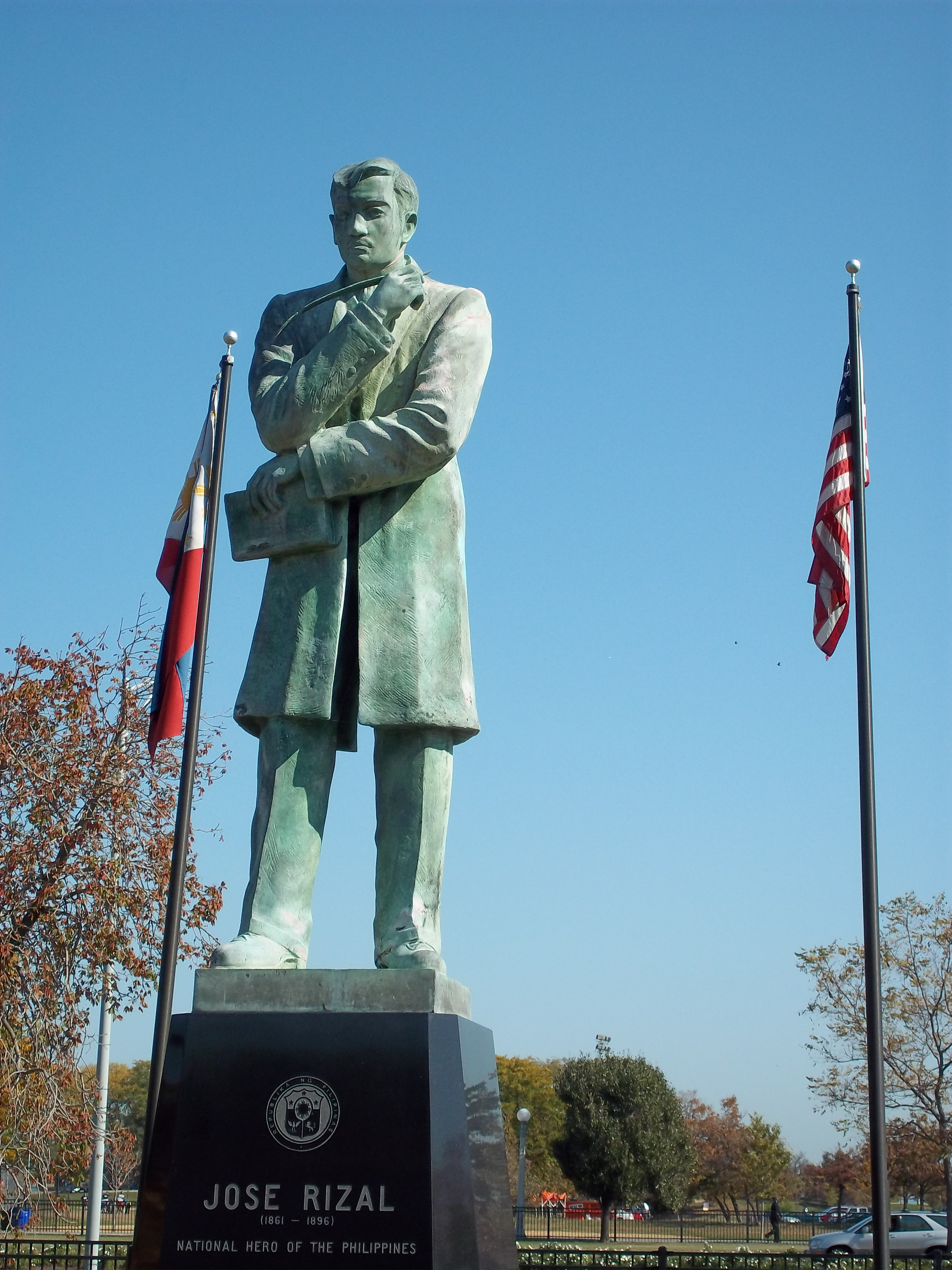
Jose Rizal

== In media ==
The 1980 film My Bodyguard contains several scenes filmed in Lincoln Park.

Phil Ochs' song "William Butler Yeats Visits Lincoln Park and Escapes Unscathed", featured on his 1969 Rehearsals for Retirement album, is about his experience walking through the park during the 1968 Democratic National Convention protests.

== Other ==
In 2004 the Lincoln Park Lagooners were inducted into the Chicago Gay and Lesbian Hall of Fame.
