= List of public art in Chicago =

The city of Chicago, Illinois, is home to notable works of public art on permanent display in an outdoor public space.

== List of public artworks ==
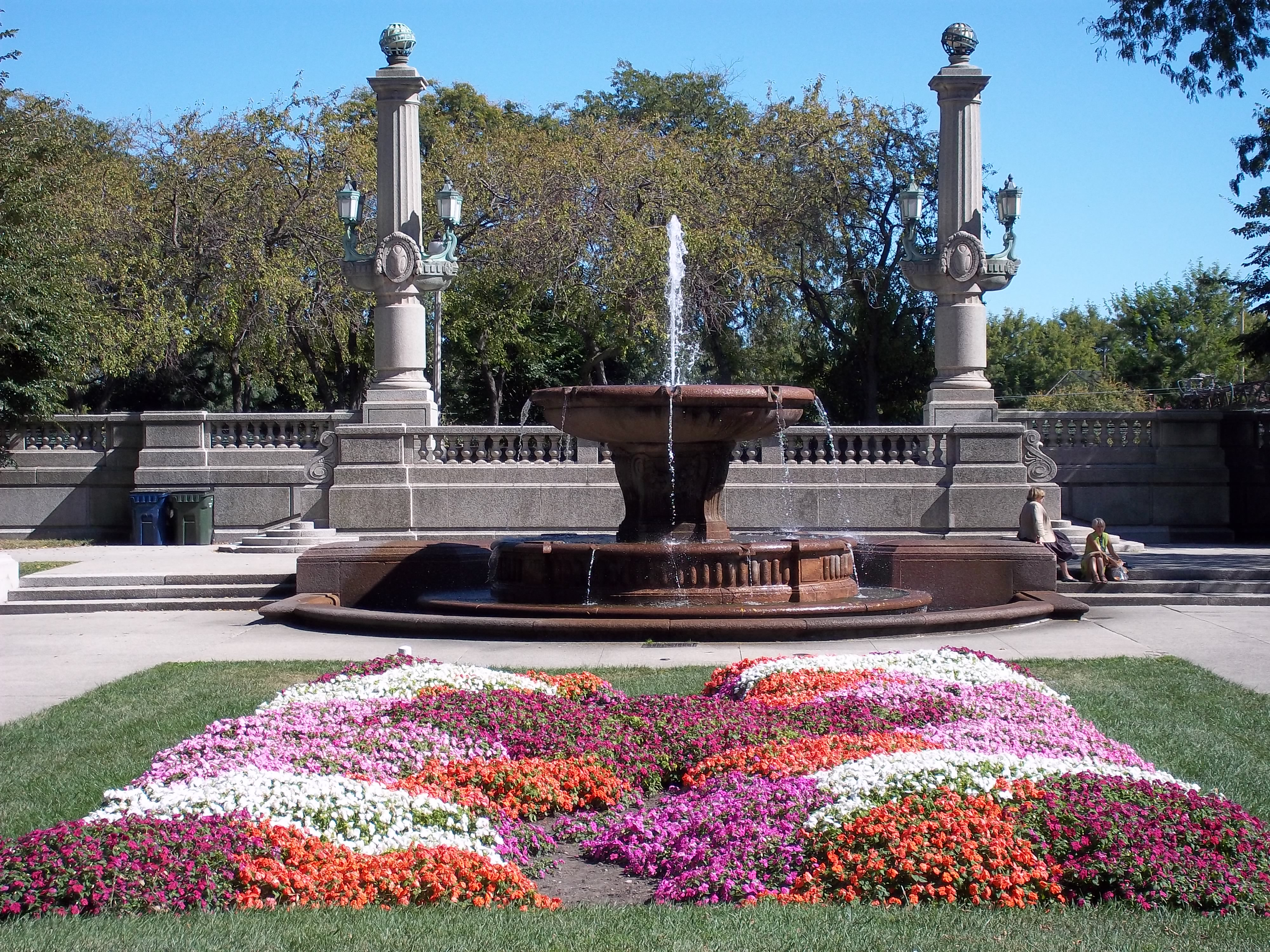
8th Street Fountain

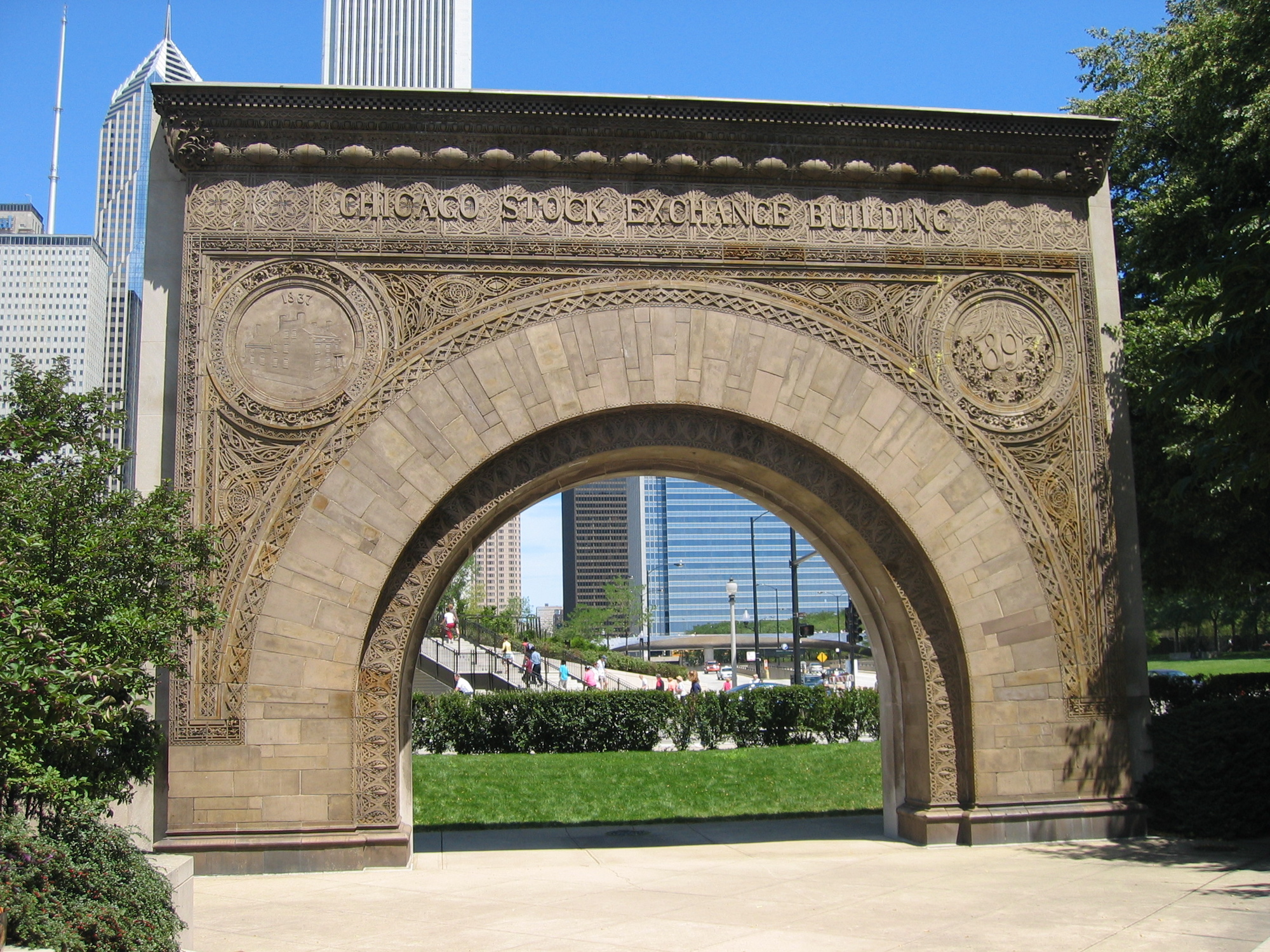
Chicago Stock Exchange Arch

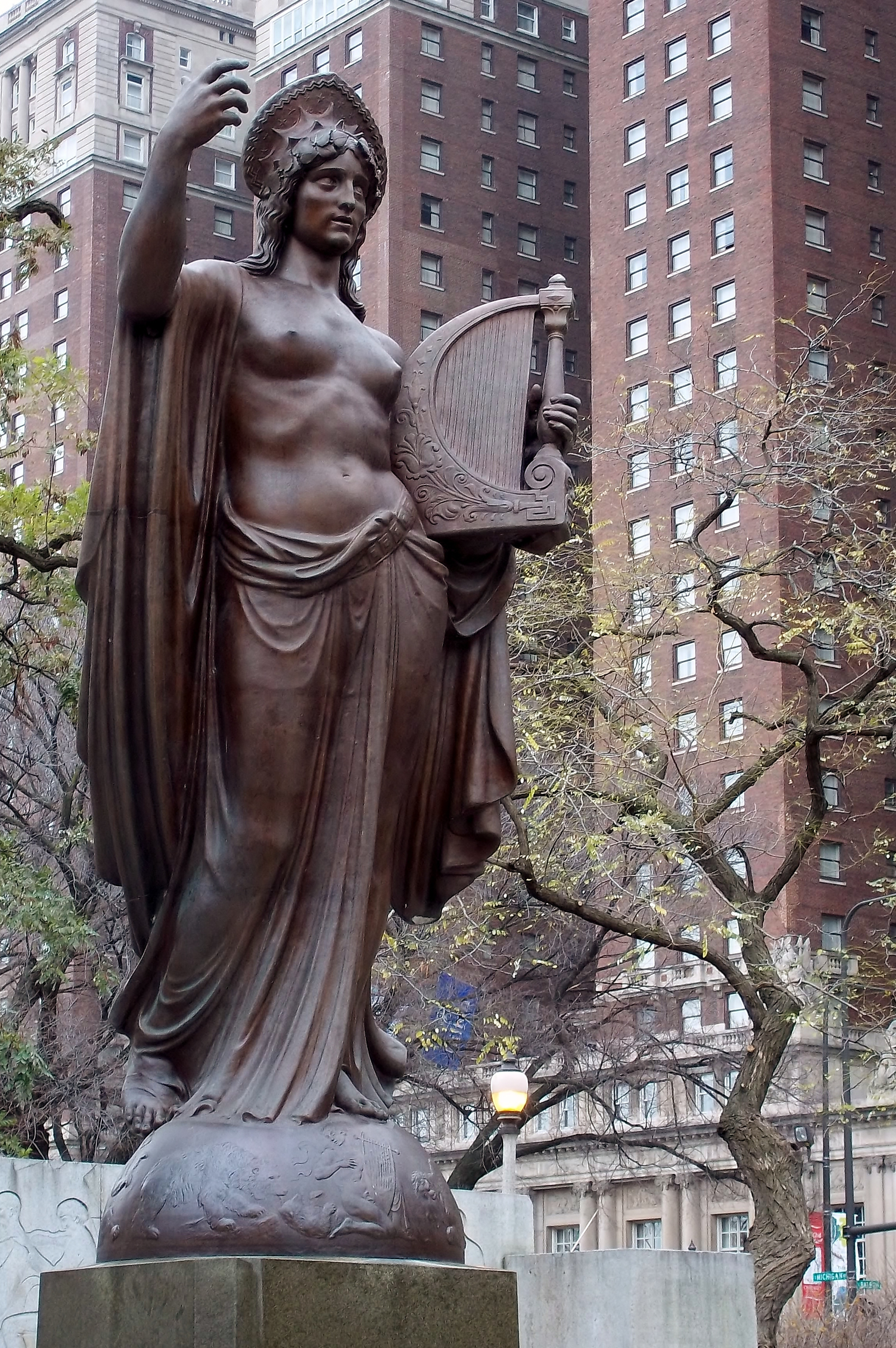
Spirit of Music

- 8th Street Fountain
- Agora
- The Alarm
- Allow Me
- America's Courtyard
- Balbo Monument
- Batcolumn
- Big Beaver Totem Pole
- The Bowman and The Spearman
- Brachiosaurus replicas
- Burnham Pavilions
- Chevron
- Chicago Picasso
- Chicago Rising from the Lake
- Chicago Stock Exchange Arch
- Children's Fountain
- Cloud Gate
- Constellation
- Crack the Whip
- Crossing
- Crown Fountain
- The Crusader
- Cubi VII
- Dialogo
- Dream Lady
- Eli Bates Fountain
- Eternal Silence
- Flamingo
- Flying Dragon
- Fountain Girl
- Fountain of the Great Lakes
- Fountain of Time
- Francis M. Drexel Memorial Fountain
- Goethe Monument
- Governor Horner State Memorial
- Grainne
- Green Lightning
- Harris Bank Fountain
- Horse and Rider
- Joseph Rosenberg Fountain
- Kwanusila
- Large Interior Form, 1953–54
- LGBT veterans monument
- Light of Truth Ida B. Wells National Monument
- Lions
- Looking Into My Dreams, Awilda
- Magdalene
- Man Enters the Cosmos
- Man with Fish
- Miró's Chicago
- Monument with Standing Beast
- Moose (W-02-03)
- Mural of Robin Williams
- Nuclear Energy
- Olmec Head, Number 8
- San Marco II
- Siblings
- A Signal of Peace
- Sky Landing
- Spiral Galaxy
- Spirit of Music
- Statue of The Republic
- Thomas Garrigue Masaryk Monument
- Torch Song
- Untitled (Rückriem)
- Untitled (Wool)
- Victory Monument
- We Will

=== Portrait sculpture ===
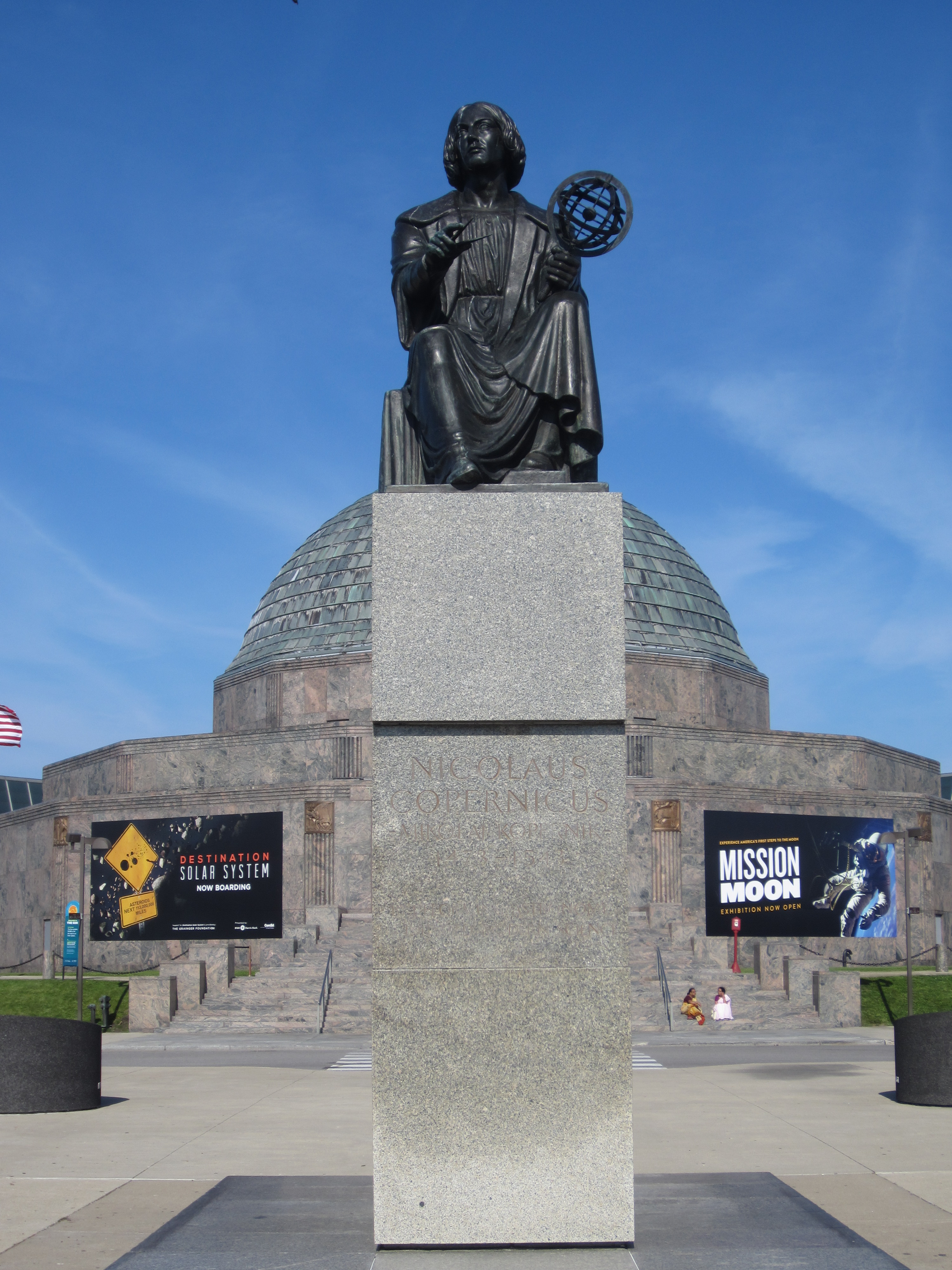
Nicolaus Copernicus Monument

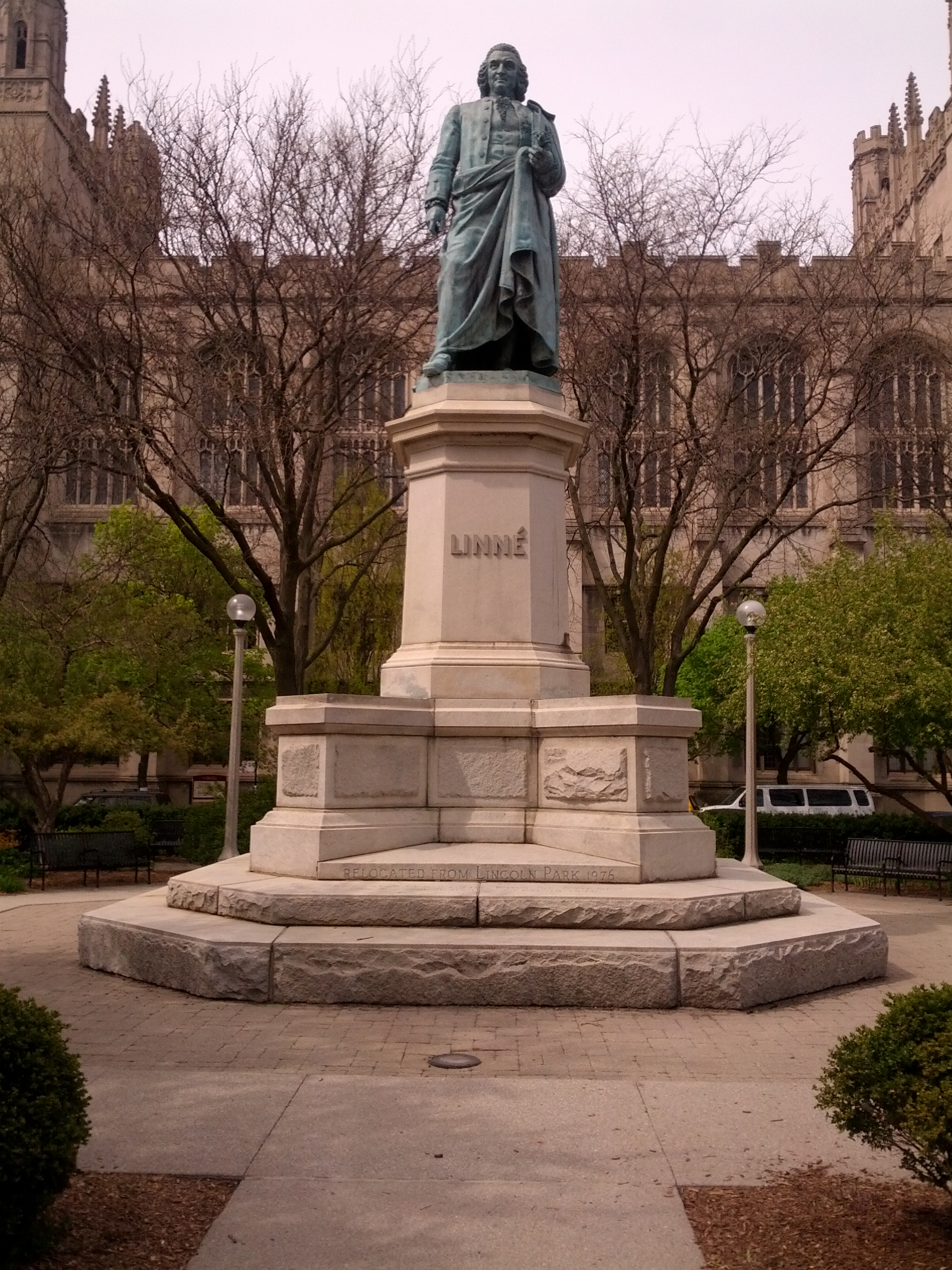
Statue of Carl Linnaeus

- John Peter Altgeld
- Jack Brickhouse
- Christopher Columbus†
- Nicolaus Copernicus
- Leif Erikson
- Benjamin Franklin
- Ulysses S. Grant
- Nathan Hale
- Alexander Hamilton
- Karel Havlíček
- Heald Square Monument
- Alexander von Humboldt
- Michael Jordan
- Benito Juárez
- Tadeusz Kościuszko
- Irv Kupcinet
- Robert Cavelier de La Salle
- Abraham Lincoln
  - The Chicago Lincoln
  - The Head of State
  - The Man
- Carl Linnaeus
- John Logan
- William McKinley
- Barack and Michelle Obama
- Richard J. Oglesby
- Louis Pasteur
- Ryne Sandberg
- Jean Baptiste Point du Sable
- Friedrich Schiller
- William Shakespeare
- Philip Sheridan
- Georg Solti
- Emanuel Swedenborg
- George Washington

== See also ==
- Art Institute of Chicago Building
- Boeing Galleries
- Cool Globes: Hot Ideas for a Cooler Planet
- Gold Star Families Memorial and Park
- Graffiti in Chicago
