= Statue of Benjamin Franklin =

Statue of Benjamin Franklin may refer to:

- Statue of Benjamin Franklin (Boston), by Richard Saltonstall Greenough, 1856
- Statue of Benjamin Franklin (Chicago)
- Statue of Benjamin Franklin (Columbus, Ohio), by James P. Anderson, 1974
- Statue of Benjamin Franklin (Portland, Oregon), by George Berry and assistants, 1942
- Statue of Benjamin Franklin (San Francisco), artist unknown, 1879
- Statue of Benjamin Franklin (Stanford University), original by Antonio Frilli, replaced by a replica by Oleg Lobykin, 2013
- Statue of Benjamin Franklin (University of Pennsylvania), by John J. Boyle, 1896–1899
- Statue of Benjamin Franklin (Washington, D.C.), by Jacques Jouvenal, 1889

== See also ==
- Benjamin Franklin National Memorial, by James Earle Fraser, 1906–1911
