= Siblings (disambiguation) =

A sibling is one of two or more individuals having one or both parents in common.

Siblings may also refer to:

- SIBLING proteins (Small integrin-binding ligand N-linked glycoproteins), such as dentin matrix acidic phosphoprotein 1
- "Siblings" (The Middle), an episode of The Middle
- Siblings (TV series), a BBC Three television series
- Siblings (pilot), a Cartoon Network short
- Siblings (sculpture), a 1997 bronze sculpture by Rosetta
