= Barry Tinsley =

American artist and sculptor (b. 1942)

Barry Tinsley (born 1942) is an American artist known for large-scale abstract pieces sculpted in stone, steel, and bronze. Tinsley became active in the Chicago area in the 1970s and received commissions under several civic and state art-in-architecture programs.

== Early life and education ==
Tinsley grew up in Roanoke, Virginia where his father was a maintenance worker for Norfolk and Western Railway. Tinsley became interested in steel as a medium while watching his father at work, maintaining the rails. He went on to earn a bachelor's degree from the College of William & Mary, and then completed an MFA at the University of Iowa in 1968.

== Career and style ==
After completing his graduate education, Tinsley established an artist studio in Chicago. His sculptures are fabricated in industrial materials, especially COR-TEN (weathering) steel, which he often combines with stone or concrete. His sculptures are predominantly abstract, and integrated with the surrounding architectural or landscape settings.

His notable sculptures include Jetty, fabricated in weathering steel in 1980 for the City of Chicago's Percent-for-Art collection, and Aqua, a bronze-and-granite sculpture constructed in 1998 at Illinois State University. Some of Tinsley's other works are held by the Smithsonian American Art Museum and other public collections.

His commissioned pieces also include projects for Dayton Hudson Properties, which later became Target Corporation).

Tinsely was one of the founding members of Chicago Sculpture International, a non-profit that advocates for public sculpture in the region.

== Selected public works ==
- Jetty (1980), Cor-Ten steel; installed at the 24th District Police Station, 6464 N. Clark St., Chicago; commissioned under the City of Chicago Percent-for-Art program.
- Untitled (1974), steel; Illinois State University campus (between the Center for Visual Arts and Centennial West), a tribute to former student Janice Louise Moorhous (1952–1972).
- Aqua (1998), bronze and granite; Illinois State University Science Laboratory Building, a triangular sculpture referencing the alchemical symbol for water; commissioned via the State of Illinois Art-in-Architecture program.
- Red Earth (1980), welded Cor-Ten steel and concrete; Smithsonian American Art Museum (relief, 17 5/8 × 28 × 4 7/8 in.).

== Legacy and affiliations ==
Tinsley is associated with the development of late-20th-century abstract public sculpture in the Midwest as well as with civic art initiatives in Chicago.

== See also ==
- List of public art in Chicago
