= San Marco II =

1986 bronze sculpture in Chicago, Illinois, U.S.

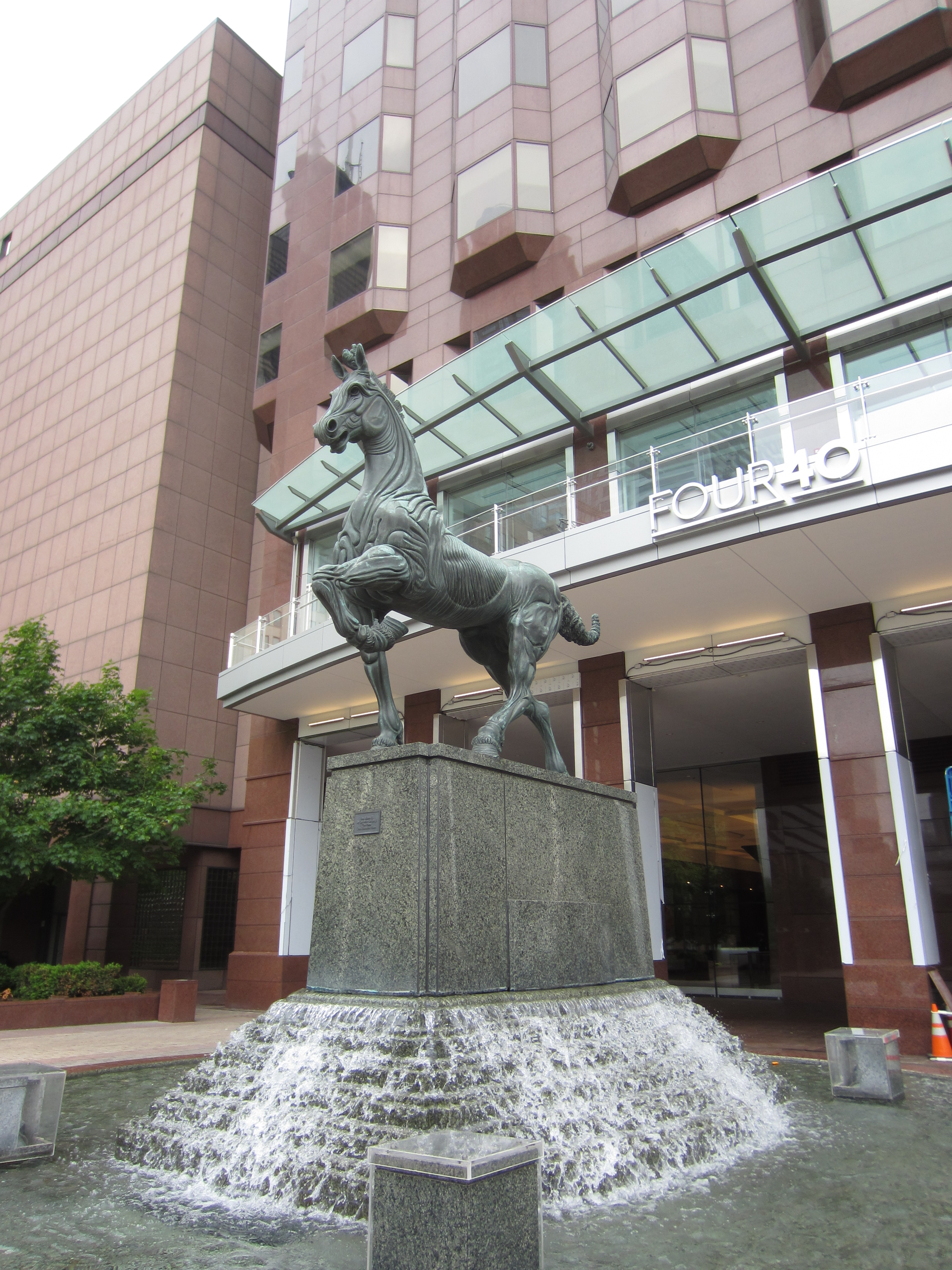
- The sculpture in 2015
- Artist: Ludovico de Luigi
- Year: 1986
- Medium: Bronze sculpture
- Location: Chicago, Illinois, U.S.
- 41°52′33.5″N 87°37′57.6″W

San Marco II is an outdoor 1986 bronze sculpture of a stallion by Italian artist Ludovico de Luigi, installed in Chicago's The Plaza, FOUR40 (formerly known as One Financial Place), in the U.S. state of Illinois.

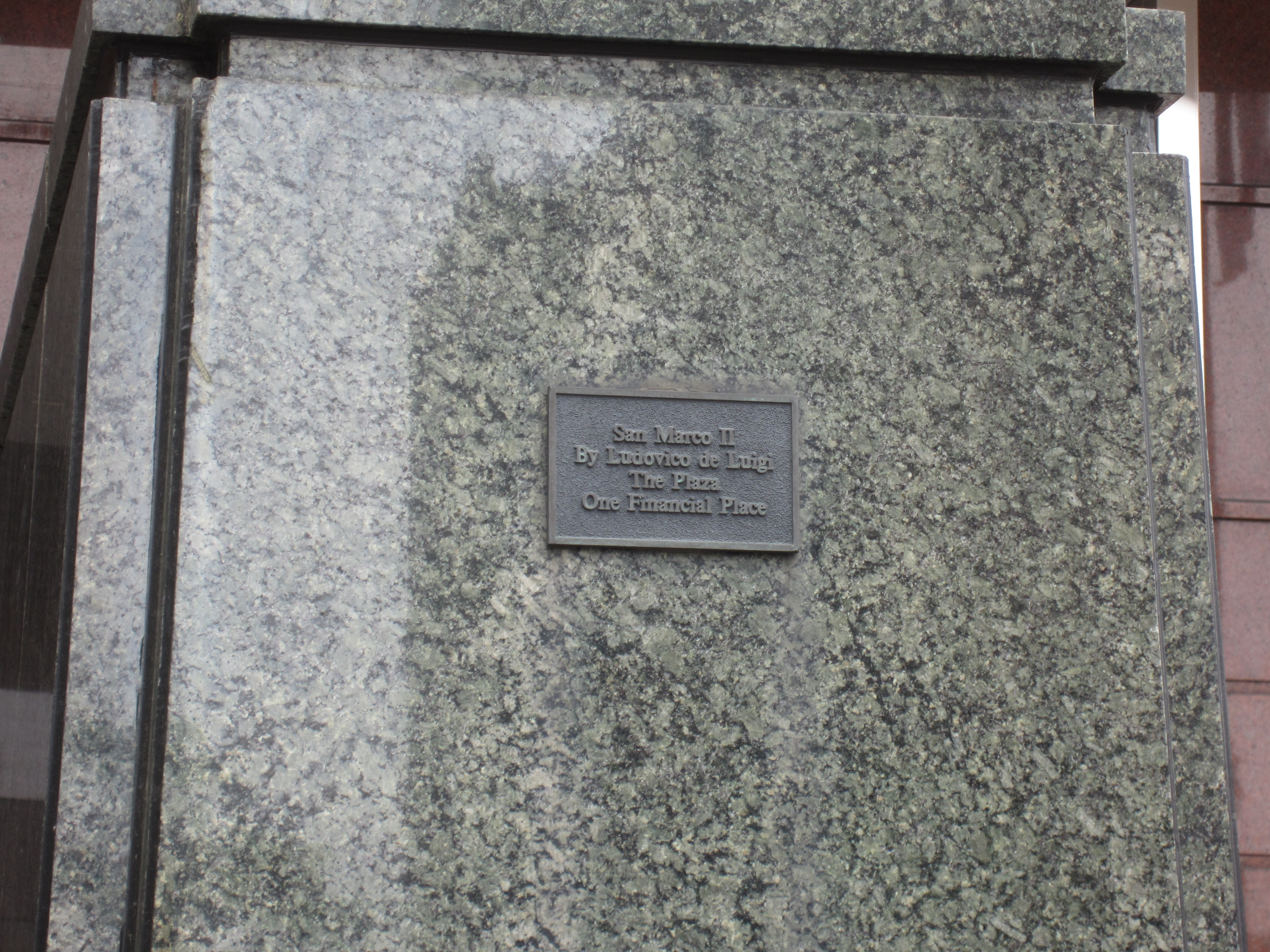
Plaque for the sculpture

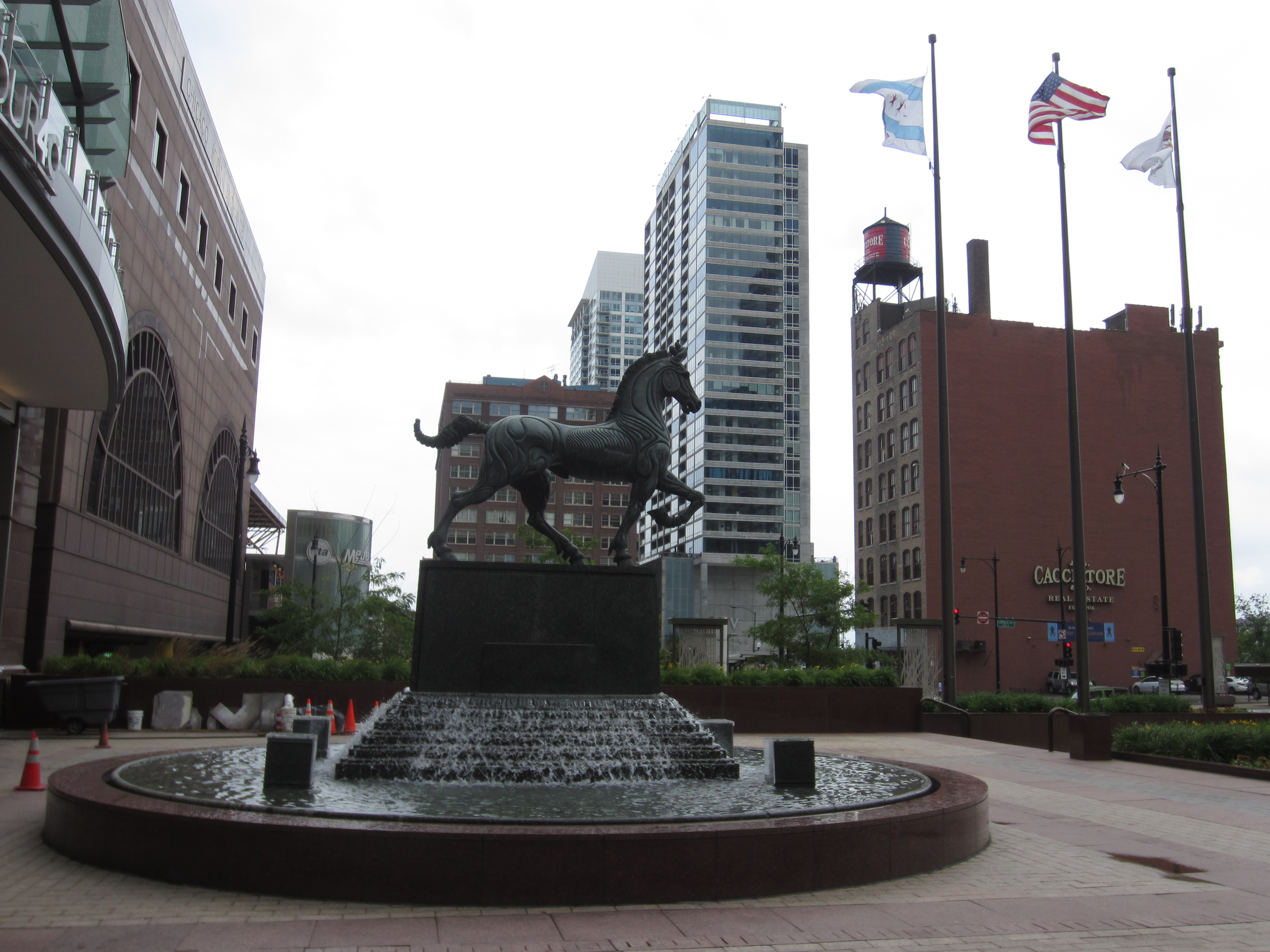
The sculpture, 2015

== See also ==
- 1986 in art
- List of public art in Chicago
