= Joseph Rosenberg Fountain =

Fountain at Grant Park in Chicago

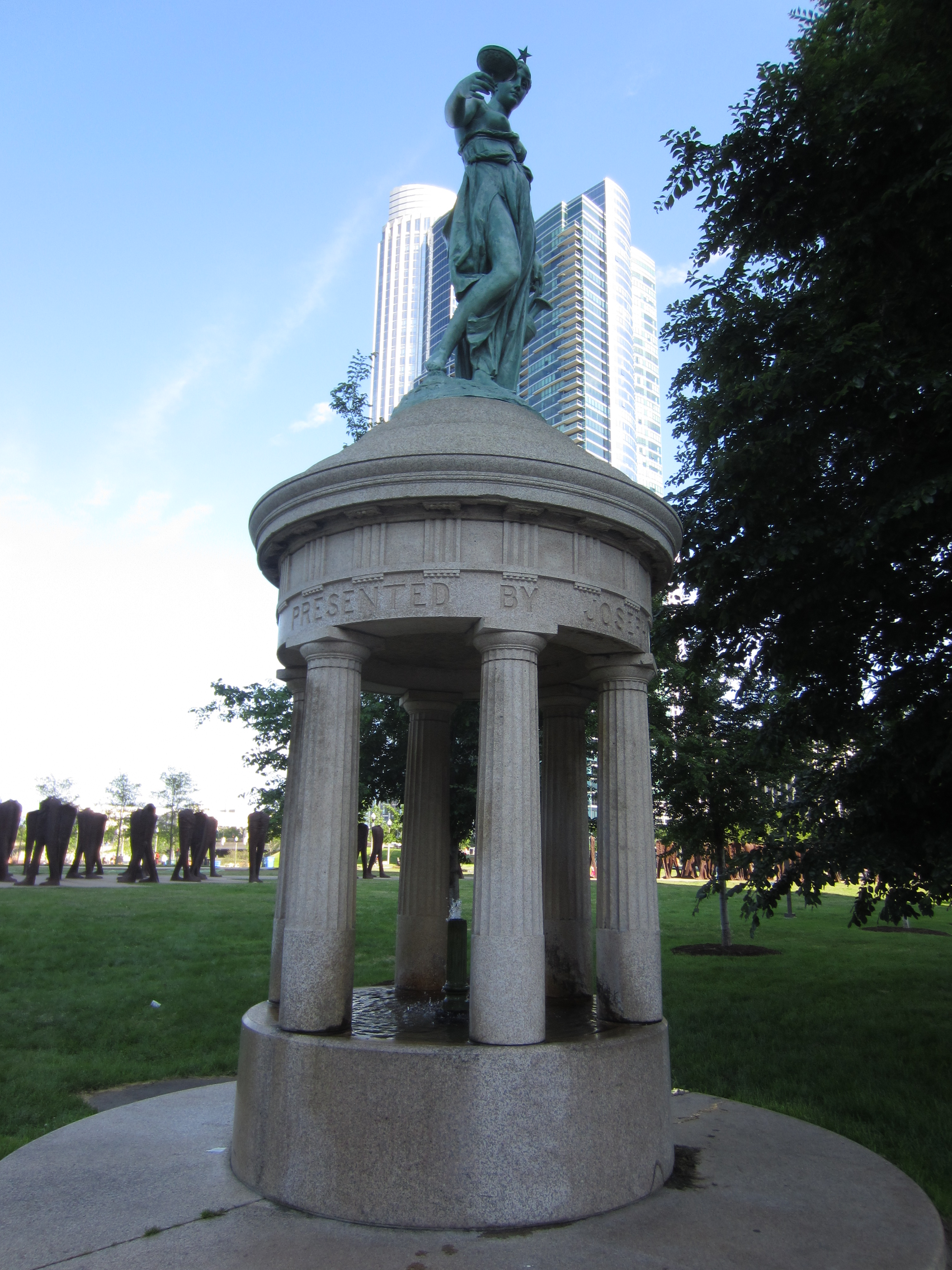
- The fountain in 2015
- Artist: Franz Machtl
- Location: Chicago, Illinois, United States; 41.868686°N 87.623794°W

Rosenberg Fountain is an outdoor fountain and sculpture by German artist Franz Machtl, installed at Chicago's Grant Park, in the U.S. state of Illinois. It features an 11-foot-tall bronze figure representing Hebe.

== See also ==
- List of public art in Chicago
