= Man with Fish =

Fountain and sculpture by Stephan Balkenhol in Chicago, Illinois, U.S.

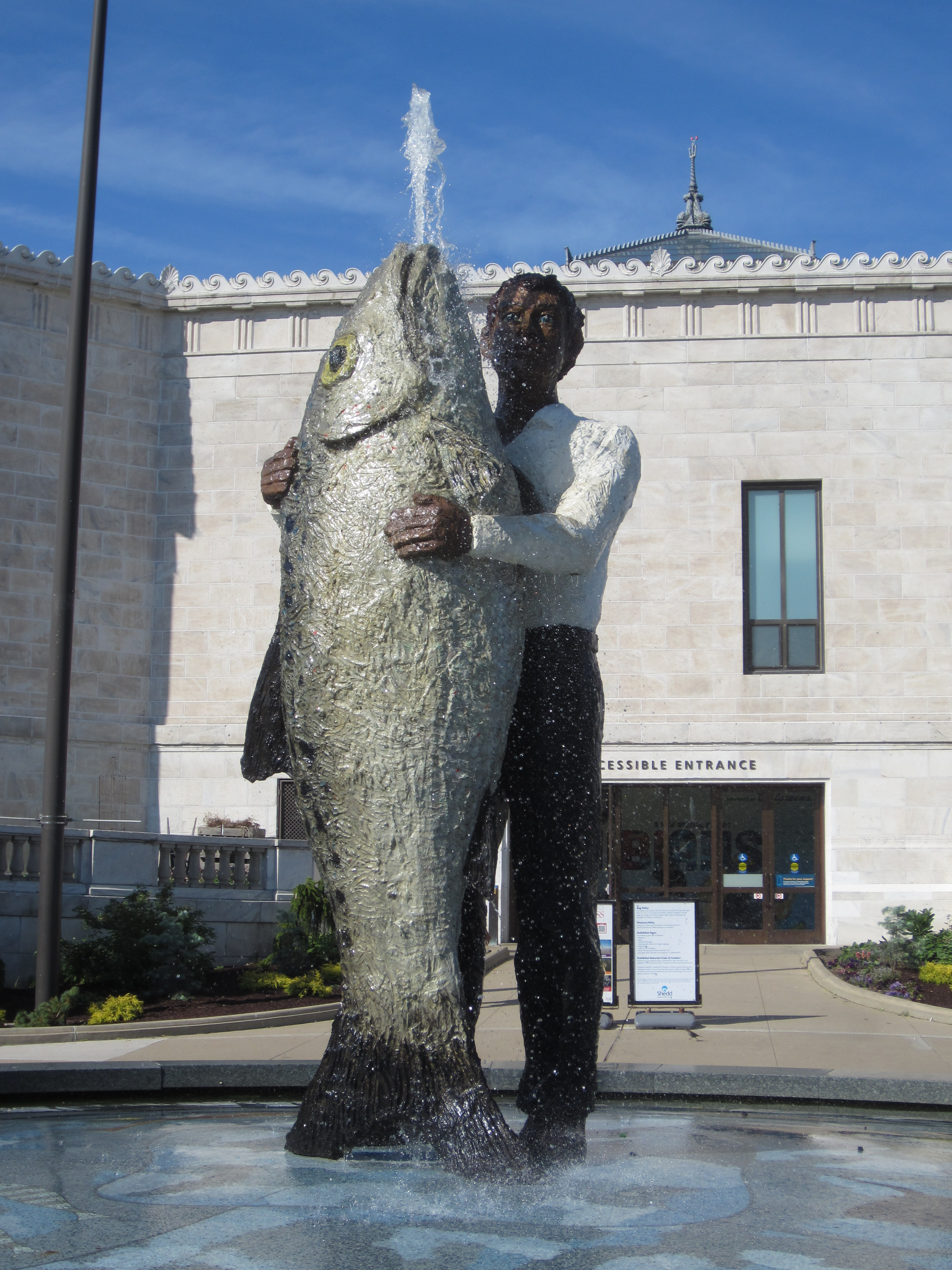
- The sculpture in 2015
- Artist: Stephan Balkenhol
- Medium: Bronze sculpture
- Dimensions: 4.9 m (16 ft)
- Location: Chicago, Illinois, U.S.; 41.86713°N 87.614653°W

Man with Fish is an outdoor fountain and sculpture installed outside Chicago's Shedd Aquarium, in the U.S. state of Illinois. The statue was donated to the aquarium by William N. Sick in recognition of his wife, Stephanie. Designed and sculpted by the German sculptor Stephan Balkenhol in 2001, the statue depicts an expressionless man standing in a shallow pond, hugging a giant fish with water spouting from its mouth. The water from the fountain falls into a reflecting pool decorated with vibrant images of marine life. It is 16 feet tall and made of painted bronze.

The statue is located at the entrance outside the building's ground-floor, on the southwest side of the aquarium. It exemplifies the human interest in aquatic life and our responsibility to preserve the world's marine and freshwater ecosystems. The design of the statue has been received negatively by some, being described as "strange and perplexing" and is frequently voted amongst the ugliest statues in the city.

In 2015, the statue was outfitted with a QR code that could be scanned to hear the statue "talking" about itself as part of the Statue Stories Chicago program. The script for the statue was written by Chris Redd and voiced by Steve Carell. Initially set to last a year, this public arts initiative was extended until the end of 2020. As part of the aquarium's Centennial Commitment plan, the area around the statue was redesigned, with a new garden and ticketing area installed by 2025 to provide patrons with a "more interactive and immersive experience".

== See also ==
- List of public art in Chicago
