= America's Courtyard =

Stone sculpture by Ary Perez and Denise Milan

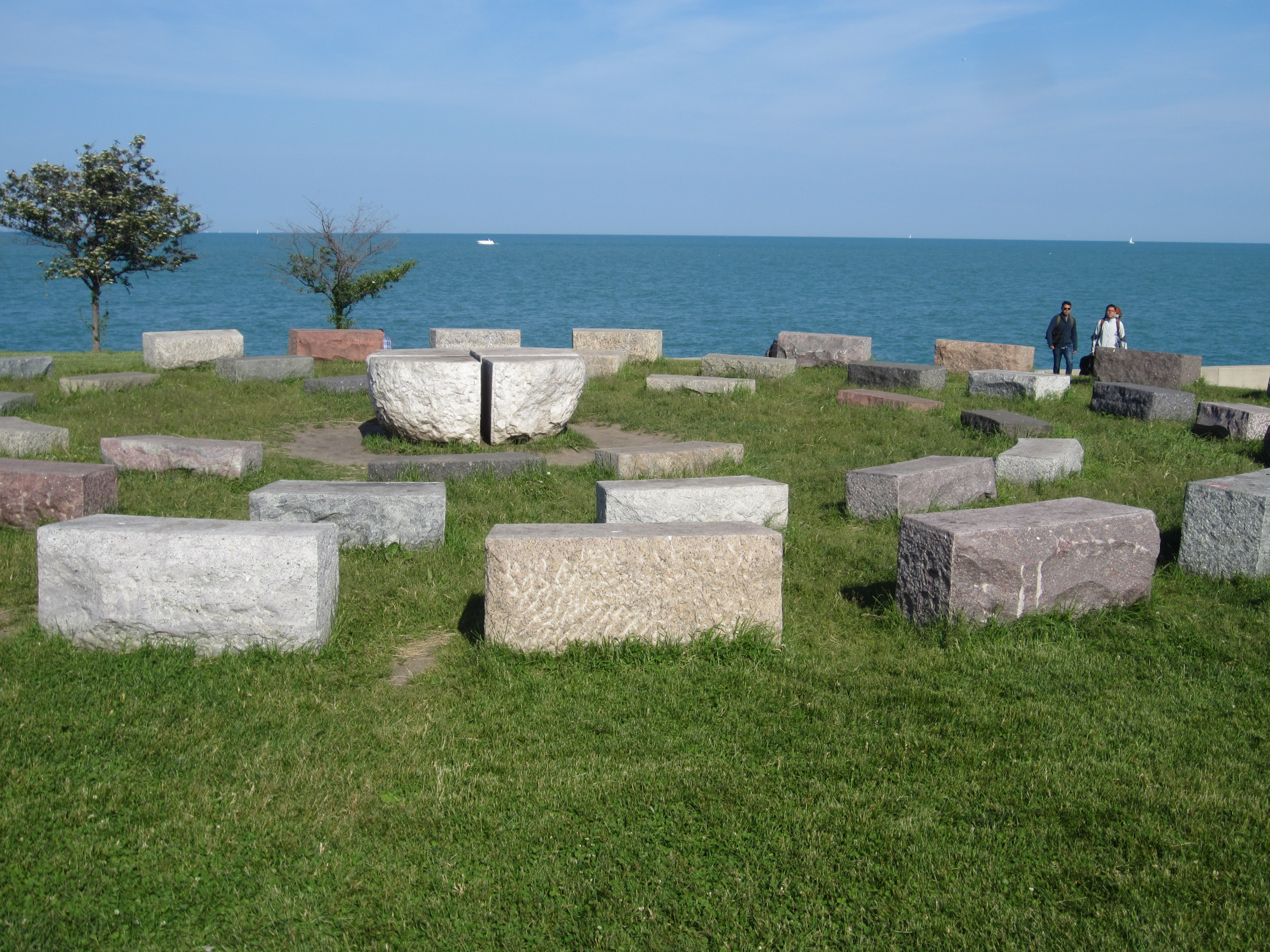
- The installation in 2015
- Location: Chicago, Illinois, United States
- 41.86569°N 87.60654°W

America's Courtyard: A Symbolic Integration of the Americas is an outdoor stone sculpture by husband and wife Brazilian artists Ary Perez and Denise Milan, installed outside Chicago's Adler Planetarium, in the U.S. state of Illinois.

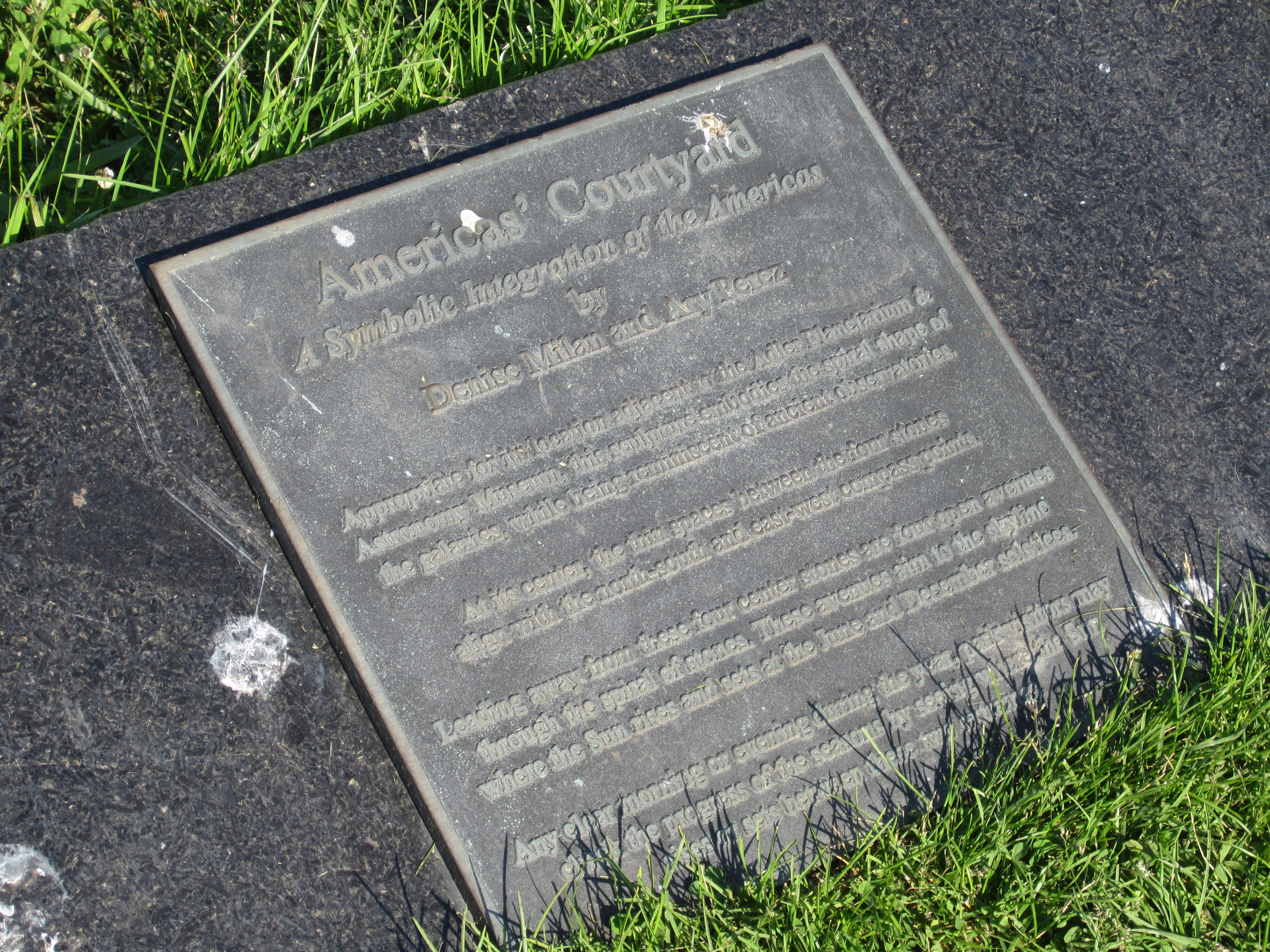
Plaque for the sculpture

== See also ==
- List of public art in Chicago
