= Bust of Jack Brickhouse =

Bust in Chicago, Illinois, U.S.

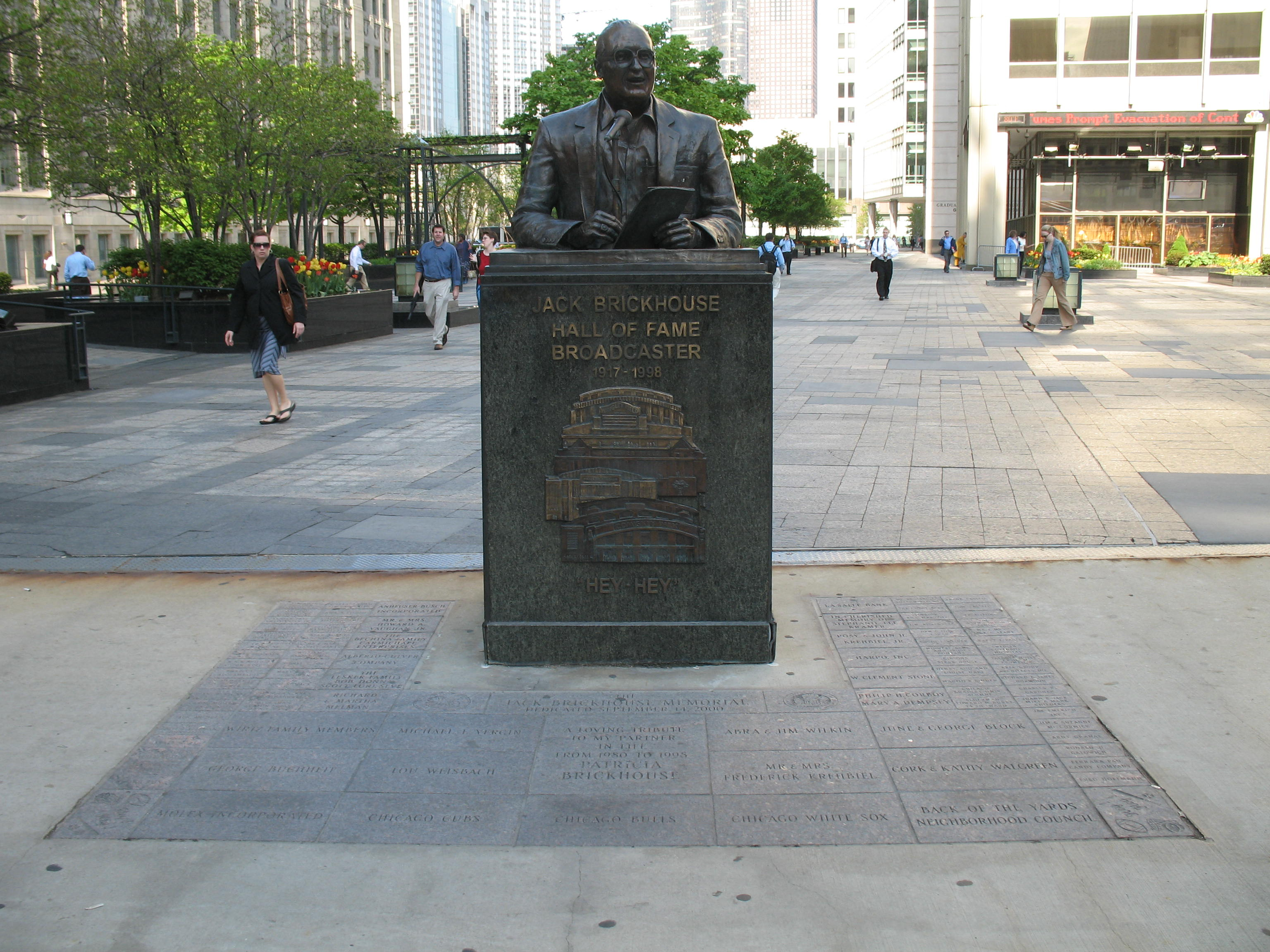
- The bust in 2007
- Subject: Jack Brickhouse
- Location: Chicago, Illinois, U.S.; 41.889884°N 87.623845°W

An outdoor sculpture of Jack Brickhouse is installed along Michigan Avenue, near the Chicago River bridge, in Chicago, Illinois. The bust was originally dedicated in 2000, and renovated in 2009.

== See also ==
- 2000 in art
- List of public art in Chicago
