= Moose (W-02-03) =

Coordinates: 41°53′23″N 87°37′26″W

- Display at the lower end of the Magnificent Mile across Michigan Avenue from the Wrigley Building
- Artist: John Kearney
- Year: 2002-2003
- Type: steel (chrome bumpers)
- Dimensions: 8 ft 9 in (2.67 m) x 4 ft 2 in (1.27 m) x 9 ft 0 in (2.74 m)
- Location: 401 N. Michigan Ave (outdoor), Chicago, IL

Moose (W-02-03) is a sculpture of a moose by John Kearney on the Magnificent Mile in front of 401 North Michigan and across Michigan Avenue from the Wrigley Building in the Near North Side community area of Chicago, Illinois. It is a welded steel (chrome bumpers) work of art created in between 2002 and 2003. Its dimensions are 8 ft 9 in (2.67 m) x 4 ft 2 in (1.27 m) x 9 ft 0 in (2.74 m)

The sculpture was part of the Artists & Automobiles (June 16 – October 15, 2006) summer public art display at the Chicago Cultural Center of artwork from recycled automobiles. The display was co-hosted by the City of Chicago Department of Cultural Affairs' Public Art Program and Allstate in honor of the 75th anniversary of Allstate's founding in Chicago.

== Gallery ==
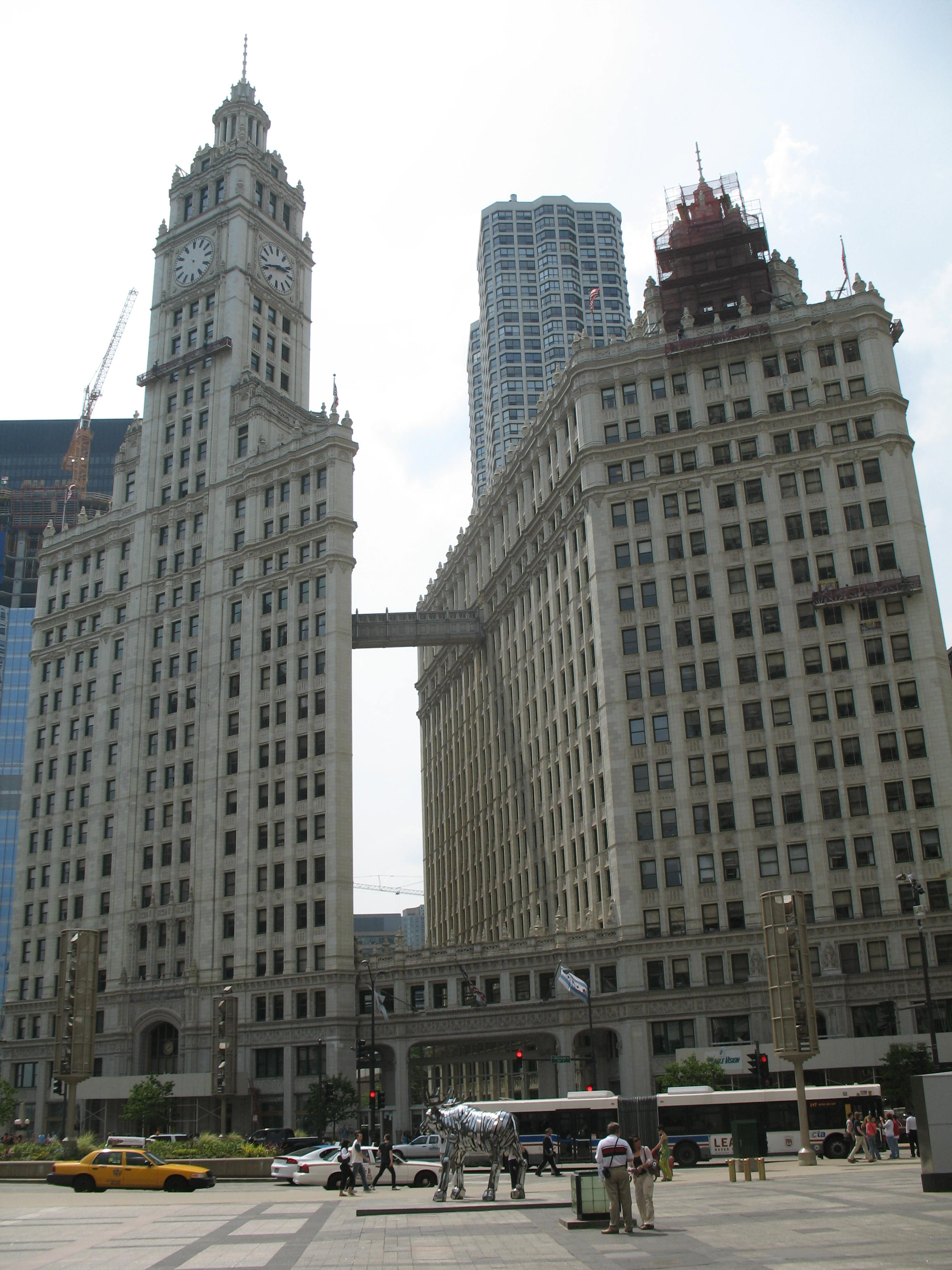

== See also ==
- List of public art in Chicago
