= Bust of Georg Solti =

Sculpture by Elisabeth Frink

Bust of Sir Georg Solti
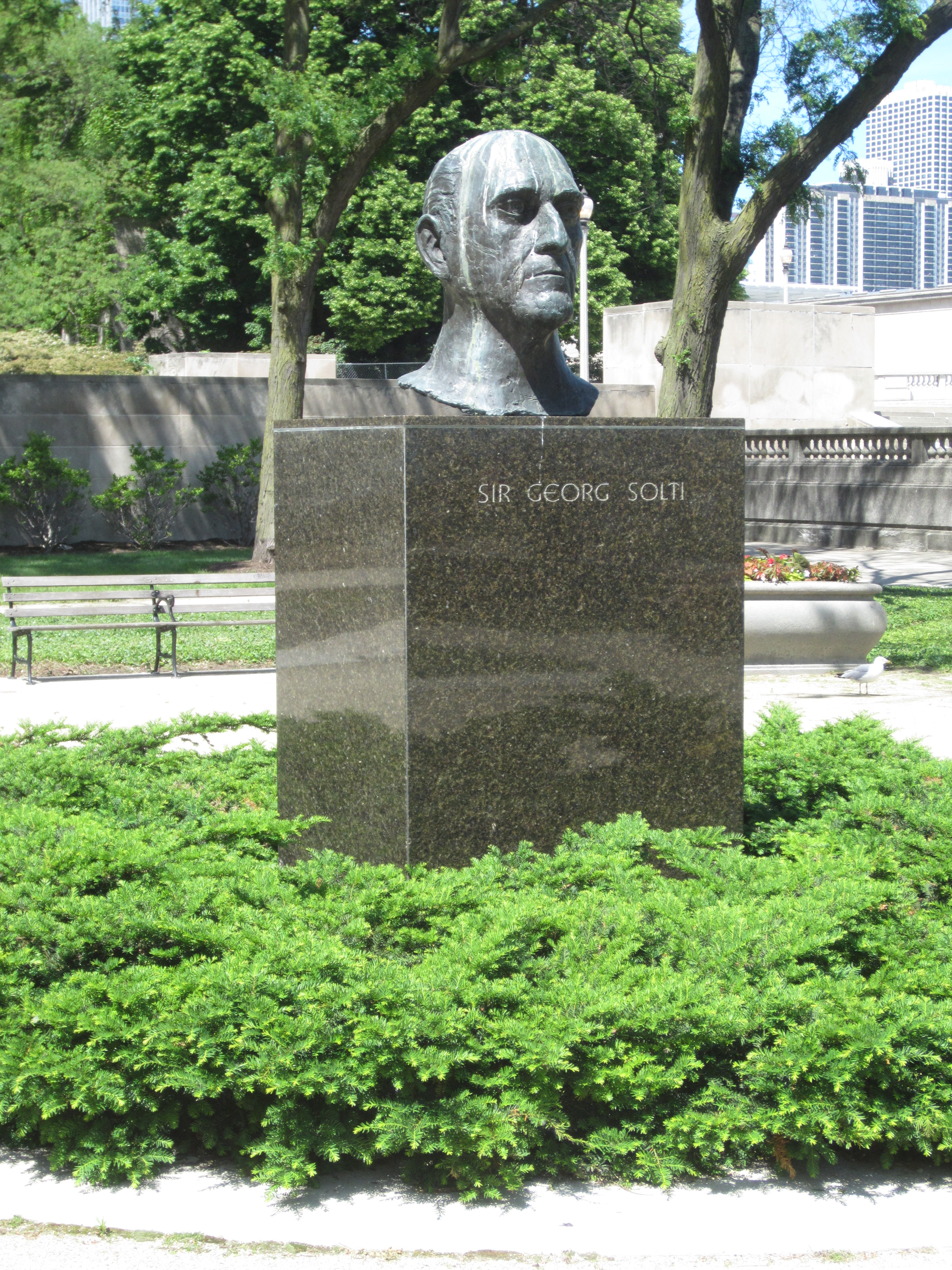
- The bust in 2015
- Artist: Elisabeth Frink
- Subject: Georg Solti
- Location: Chicago, Illinois, U.S.; 41°52′41.2″N 87°37′25.2″W

A bronze bust of Georg Solti by Elisabeth Frink is installed in Chicago, in the U.S. state of Illinois.

== History ==
A bronze bust of Sir Georg Solti by Elisabeth Frink was dedicated in Lincoln Park, Chicago, outside the Lincoln Park Conservatory on October 10, 1987, commemorating the conductor's seventy-fifth birthday. It was first displayed temporarily at the Royal Opera House in London. The sculpture was moved to Grant Park and rededicated in October 2006 in the Sir Georg Solti Garden, near Symphony Center, home of the Chicago Symphony Orchestra.

== See also ==
- List of public art in Chicago
