= Chicago Brachiosaurus replicas =

Pair of dinosaur replicas in Chicago, Illinois, U.S.

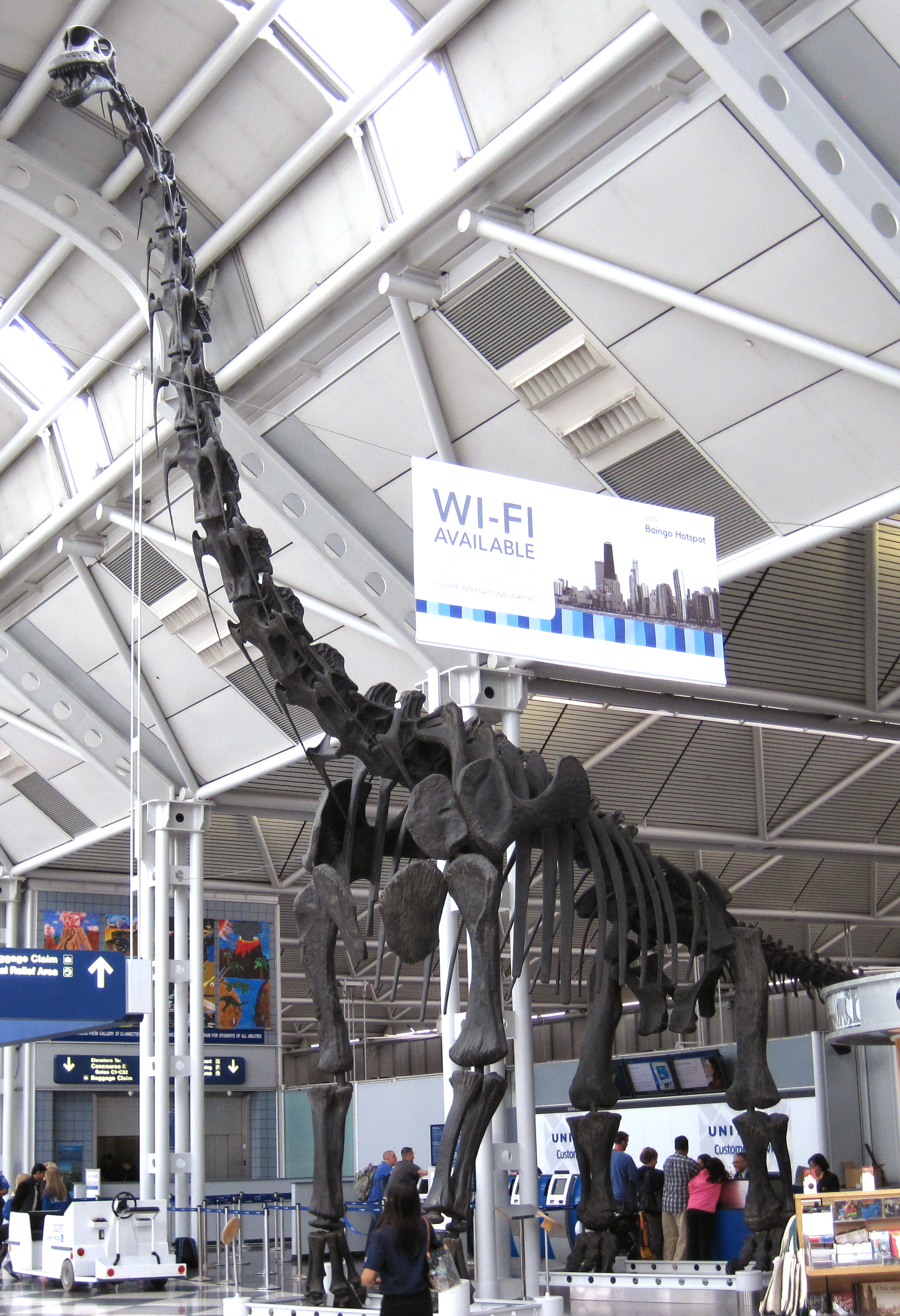
- The original replica at O'Hare International Airport in 2012
- Subject: Brachiosaurus
- Location: Chicago, Illinois, United States

There are two replicas of a Brachiosaurus skeleton discovered by paleontologist Elmer S. Riggs, both of which have been on public display in Chicago, in the U.S. state of Illinois. The original replica was unveiled at the Field Museum of Natural History in 1993 and relocated to O'Hare International Airport in 1997. An all-weather cast, created in 1999 and referred to as "Brachiosaurus Replica" by the Chicago Park District, was displayed outside the Field Museum until 2022, when disassembly was required after an inspection revealed there was damage. Both replicas have been outfitted with clothing representing Chicago sports teams.

== Casts and history ==
=== Original replica ===
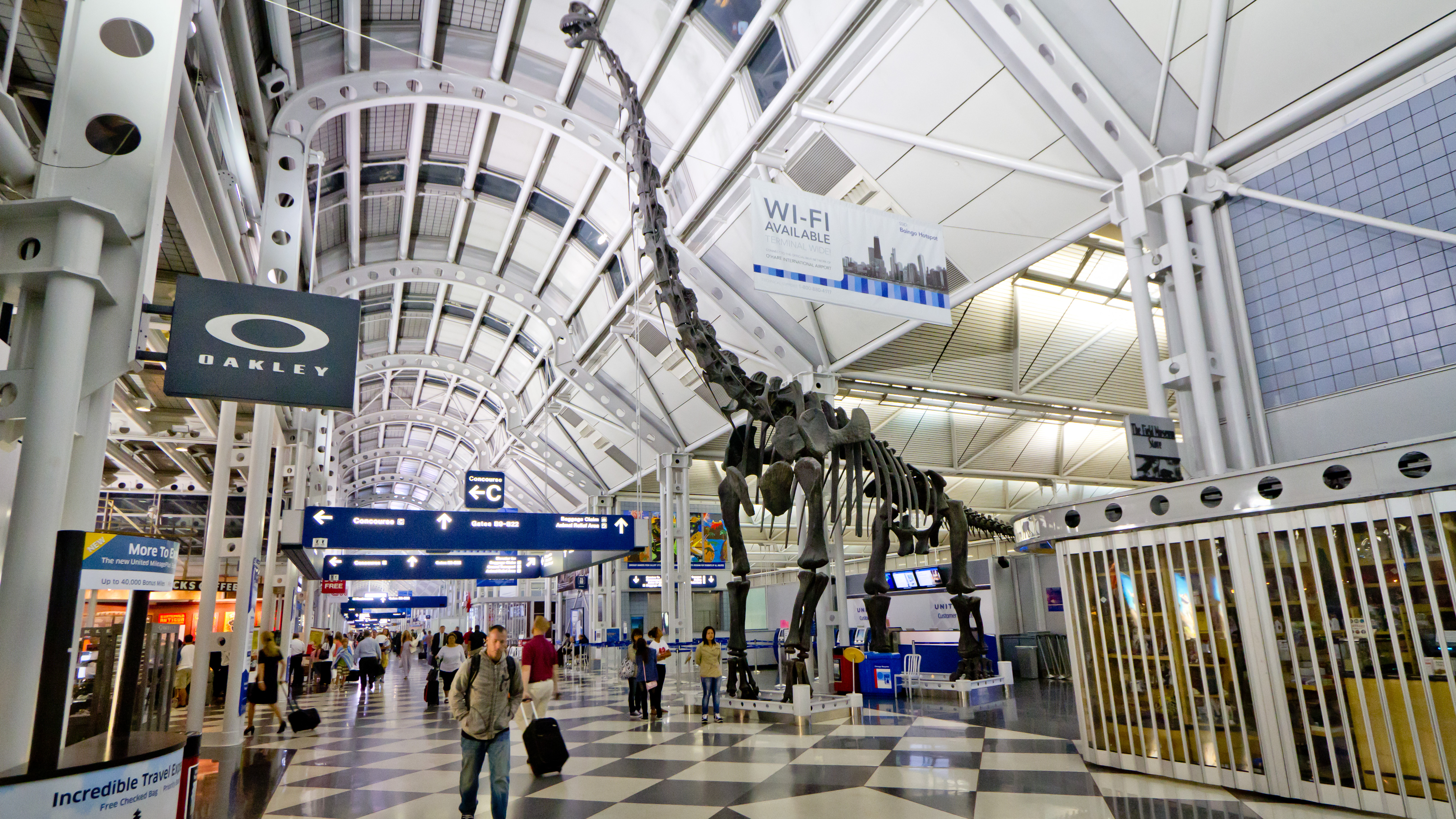
The replica in 2011

In 1993, Chicago's Field Museum of Natural History unveiled a mounted skeleton in Stanley Field Hall of a Brachiosaurus discovered by paleontologist Elmer S. Riggs. The skeleton includes casts of the dinosaur as well as "life-sized model bones based on the closely related Giraffatitan from Tanzania", according to Chicago Park District.

In 1997, the 72-foot-tall skeleton was relocated to the United Airlines Terminal at O'Hare International Airport's Terminal 1 (Concourse B). It is installed outside the Field Museum's store, and has been described as one of the best Brachiosaurus skeletons. In 2019, United Airlines outfitted the replica with a Chicago Bears jersey.

In 2010, Smithsonian magazine's science correspondence Riley Black wrote, "On my way back from Montana, I had a layover in Chicago's O'Hare International Airport, and it was there that I spotted this impressive mount of Brachiosaurus altithorax... I have to say that seeing this one near my departure terminal made me think about heading right back out into the field." Travel + Leisure noted the replica in a 2015 overview of nine airports in the U.S. "for art lovers". In 2017, Jenny Xie ranked the replica nineteenth in Curbed's list of 27 "cool airport amenities, in order of increasing absurdity". Time Out included a viewing of the dinosaur in a 2023 list of the ten "best things to do" at O'Hare.

=== Former all-weather cast ===
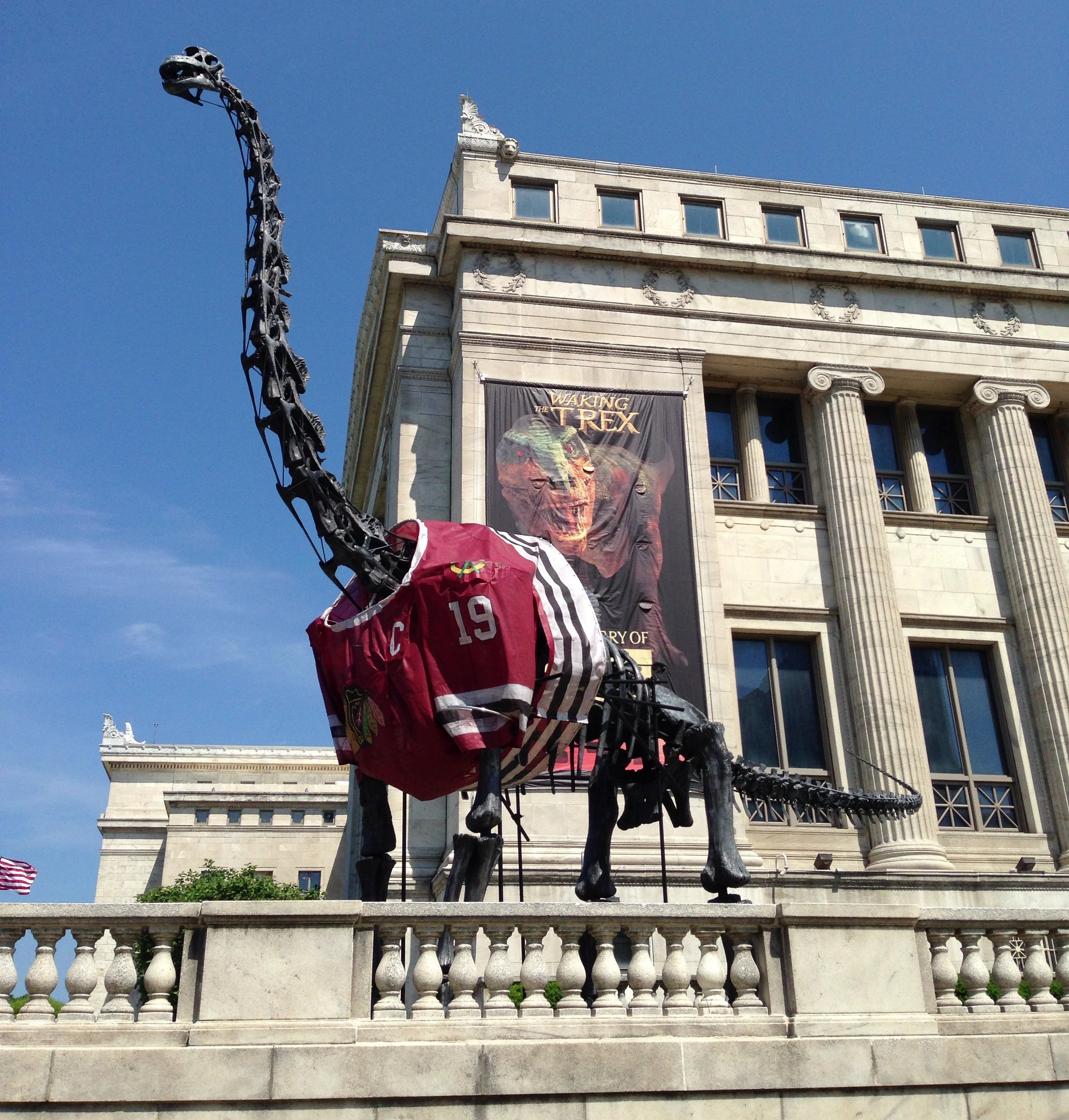
The replica outside the Field Museum of Natural History in 2013

In 1999, an all-weather cast of Riggs' Brachiosaurus was installed on the museum's northwest terrace. The replica was visible from Lake Shore Drive and became "iconic for donning the jersey of various Chicago teams during sports seasons", according to Chicago Park District. Vice magazine described the replica as "four stories tall, prodigiously forelimbed, skull-crested king of thundering behemoths, with a ribcage the size of a studio apartment".

The skeleton was outfitted with Chicago Blackhawks clothing in 2009, 2010, and 2014. The Blackhawks clothing, which was designed by Gary Heitz of Chicago Scenic Studios, could not be used in 2015 because of weather damage. The dinosaur was outfitted with a Chicago Bears jersey in 2017. In 2018, the 45-foot-tall, 2,000-pound replica sported a custom-fit Chicago Cubs jersey ahead of playoffs.

In 2022, the cast was disassembled after an inspection showed signs of "severe" damage. The steel used to hold pieces together was slated for recycling.

== See also ==
- Cultural depictions of dinosaurs
- List of public art in Chicago
- Sue (dinosaur), a permanent feature of the Field Museum of Natural History
