= Magdalene (sculpture) =

Sculpture in Chicago, Illinois, U.S.

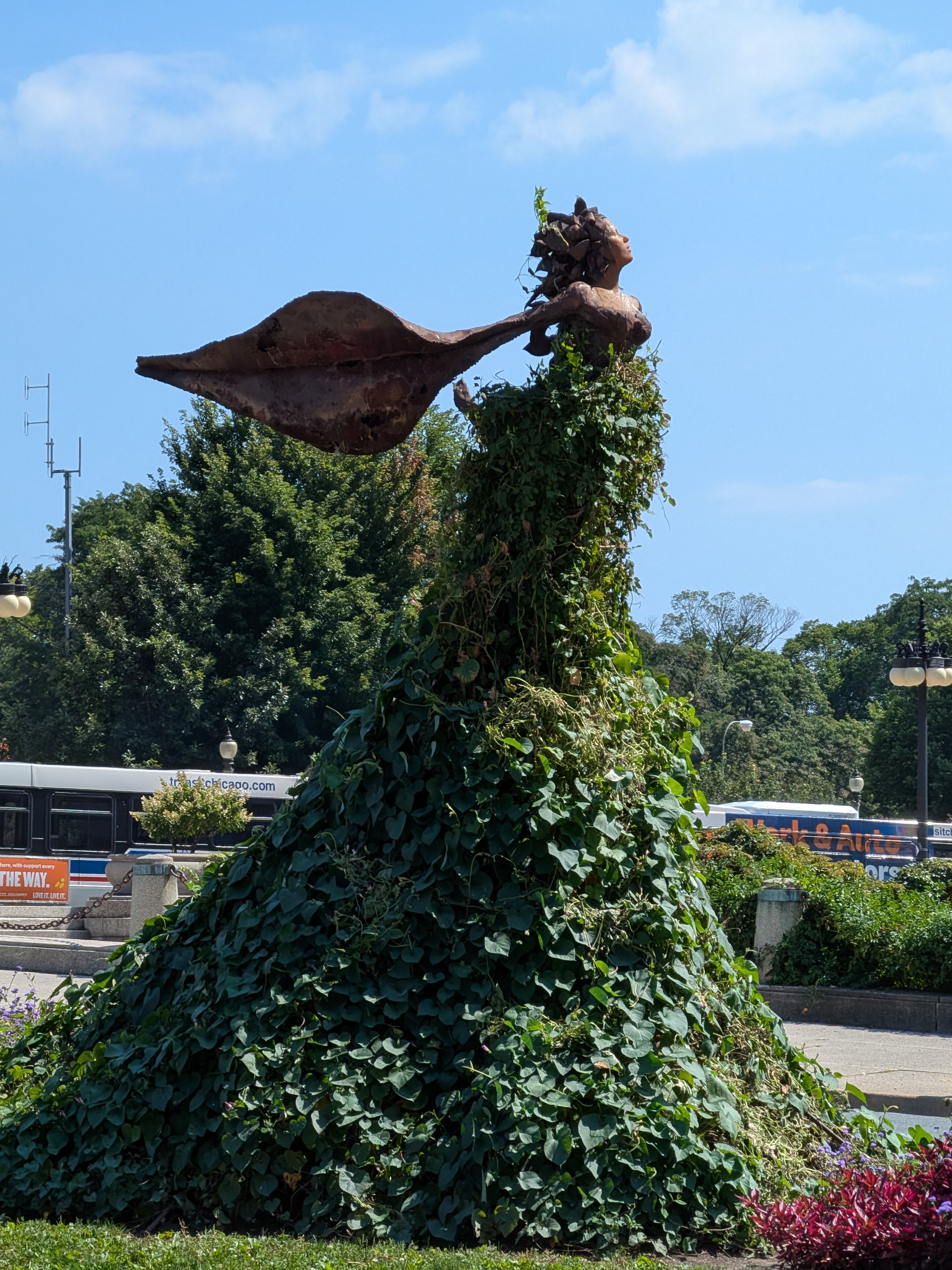
- Magdalene in Congress Park in the summer
- Artist: Dessa Kirk
- Year: 2005
- Location: Chicago, Illinois, United States; 41°52′32.64″N 87°37′25.86″W

Magdalene is an outdoor 2005 sculpture by Dessa Kirk, designed specifically for the triangular garden in Congress Plaza, east of S. Michigan Avenue at East Ida B. Wells Drive, in Chicago's Grant Park, in the U.S. state of Illinois. The statue is part of the Chicago Public Art Program.

Kirk created the sculpture specifically for this site. In the springtime, tulips line the female figure's feet, and in the summertime the sculpture becomes part of the surrounding garden, as vines and flowers fill up the skirt of her dress. Kirk has similar installations in Columbus, Indiana; Three Oaks, Michigan; and Anchorage, Alaska.

== See also ==
- 2005 in art
- List of public art in Chicago
