= Untitled (Wool) =

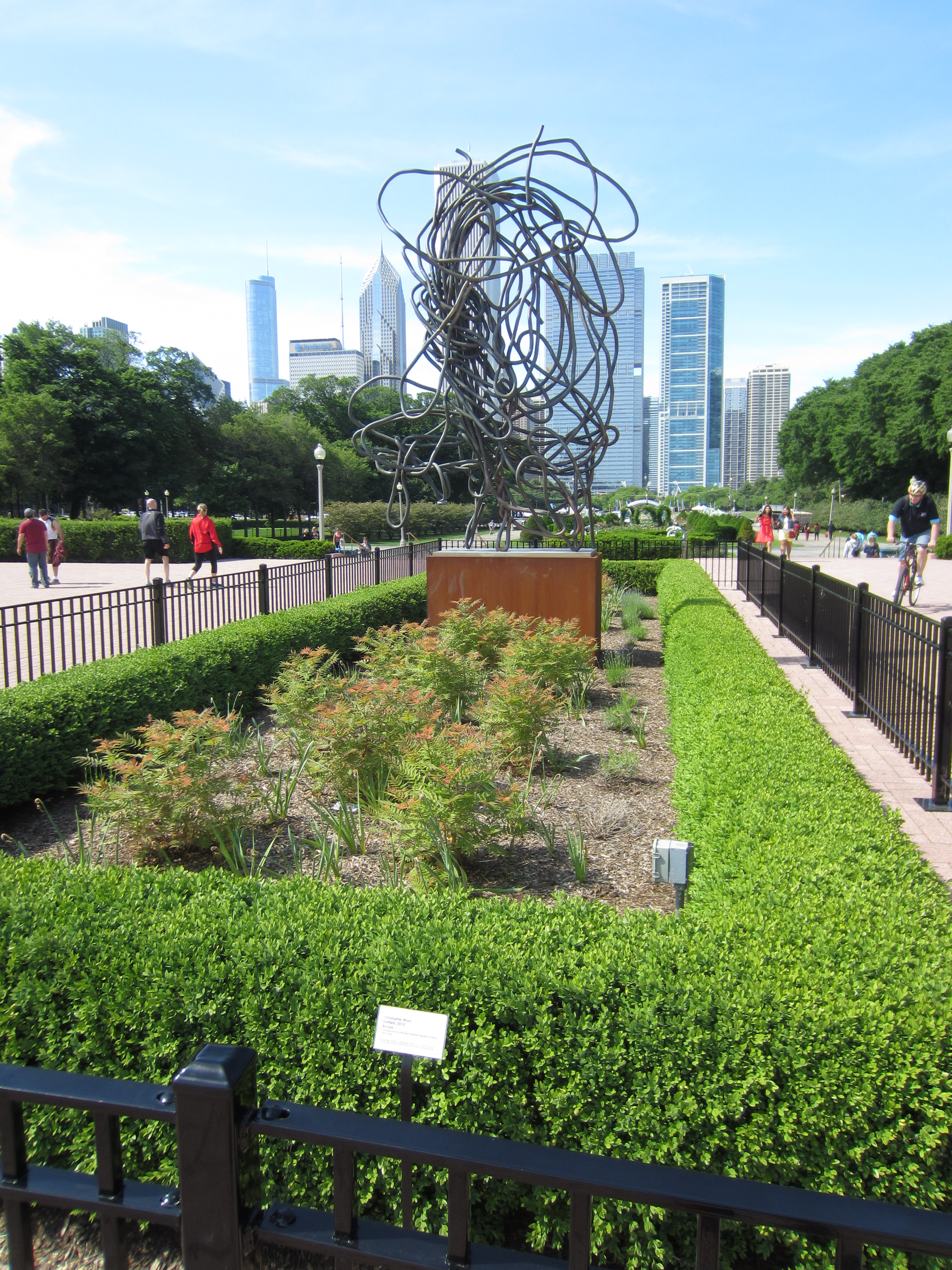
- The sculpture in 2015
- Artist: Christopher Wool
- Year: 2013
- Medium: Bronze sculpture
- Location: Chicago, Illinois, U.S.
- 41°52′36.4″N 87°37′08.3″W

Untitled is a 2013 bronze sculpture by Christopher Wool, installed on the north end of Chicago's Buckingham Fountain Plaza in Grant Park, in the U.S. state of Illinois. The work has been installed since August 2014. According to the Chicago Parks Foundation, the sculpture "stands out as an amorphous shape against the grid of the skyline behind".

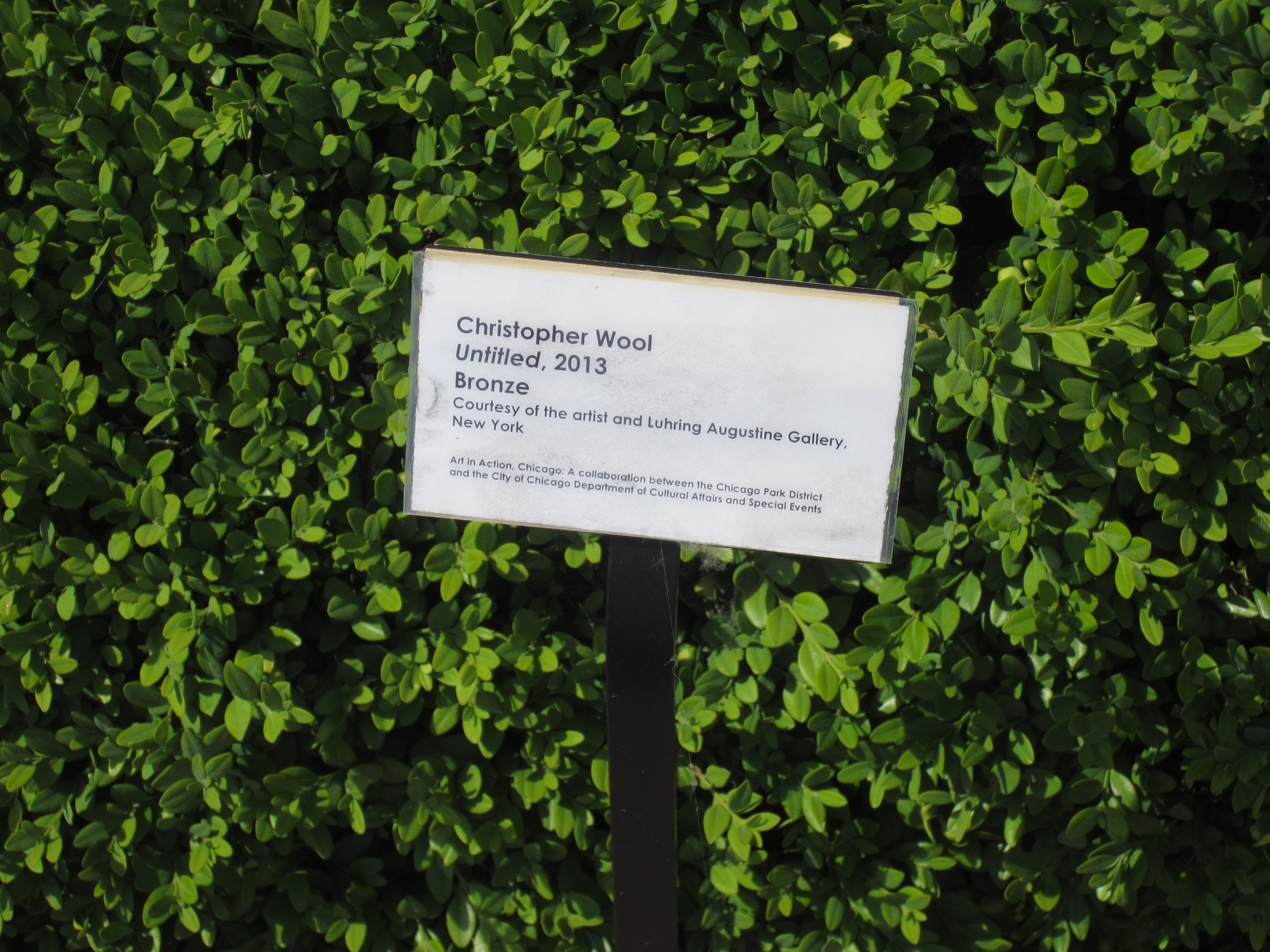
Plaque

== See also ==
- List of public art in Chicago
