= Gold Star Families Memorial and Park =

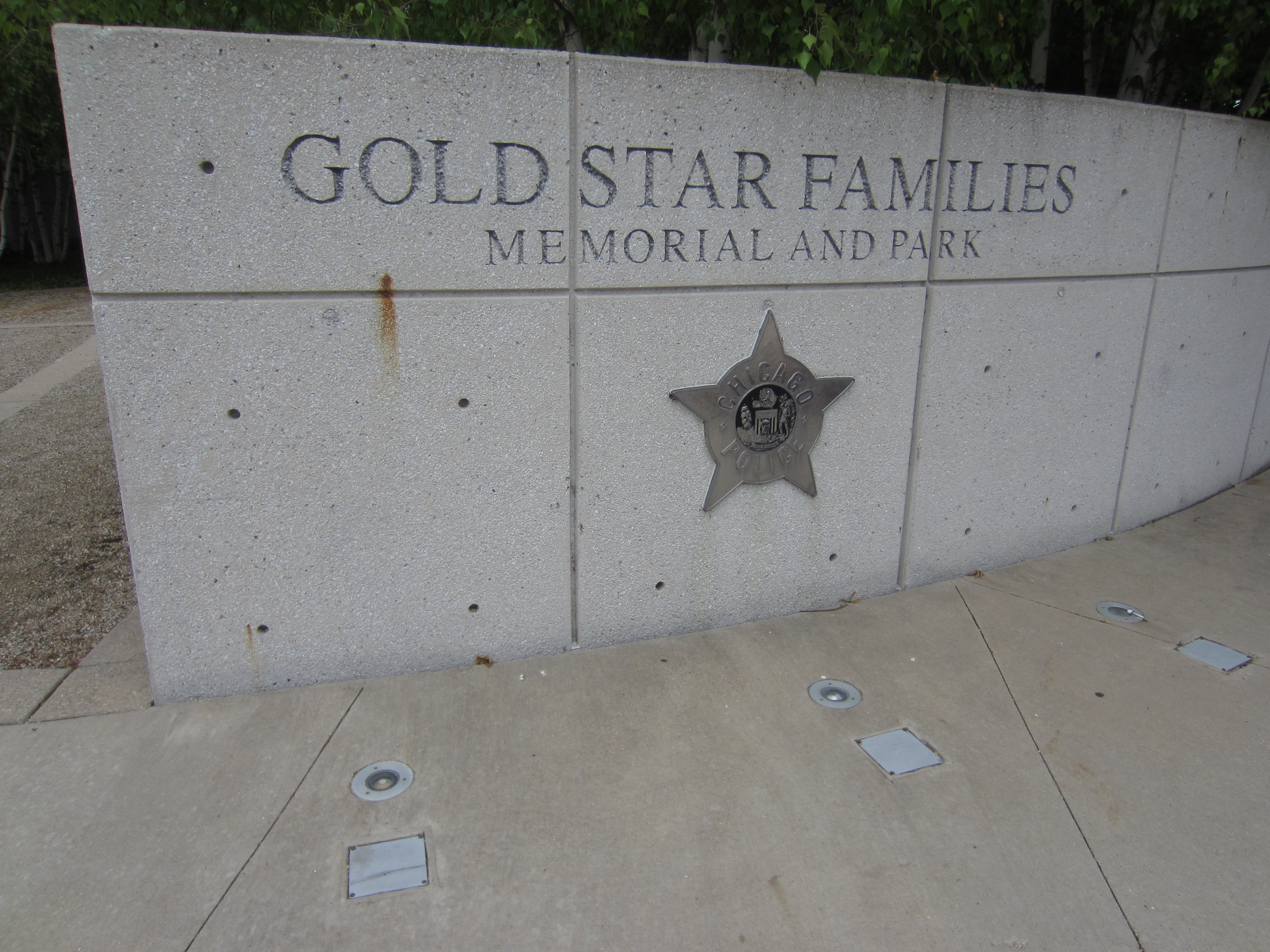
- The memorial in 2015
- Interactive map of Gold Star Families Memorial and Park
- Location: Chicago
- Coordinates: 41.86243°N 87.61406°W
- Type: Memorial
- Dedicated date: 2006
- Dedicated to: CPD officers who died in the line of duty

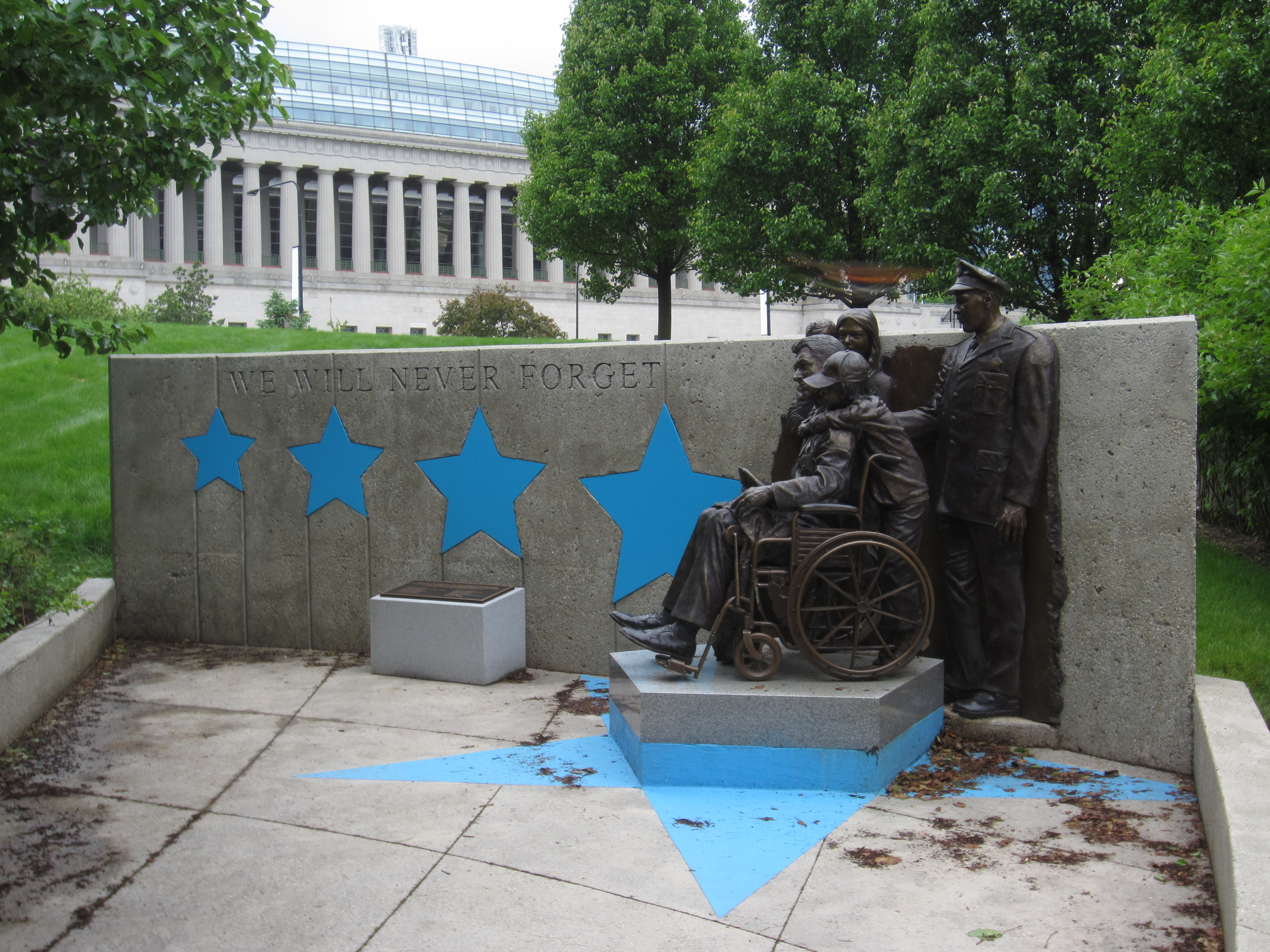
The memorial in 2015

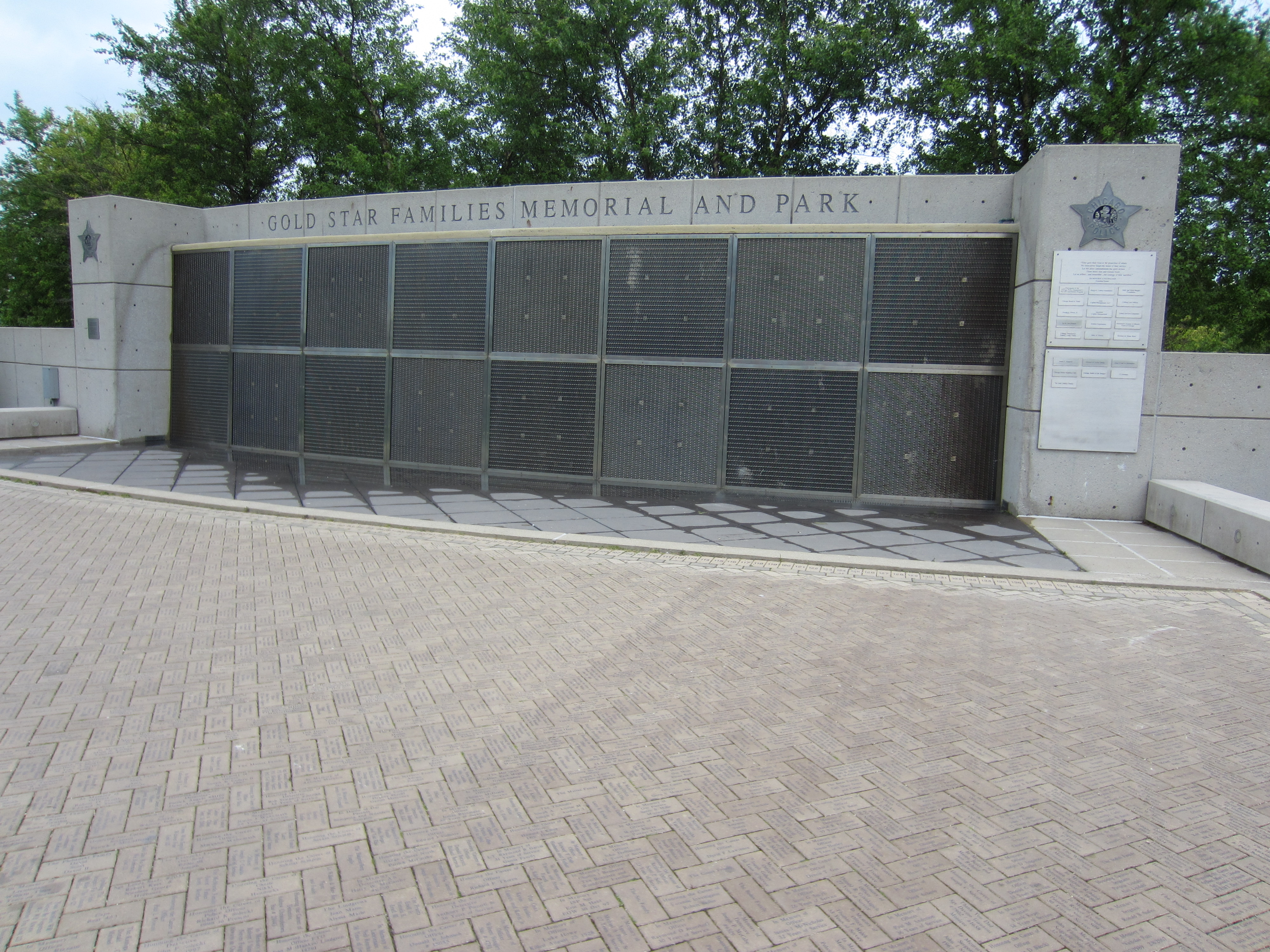
The memorial in 2015

Gold Star Families Memorial and Park is located east of Soldier Field in Chicago, in the U.S. state of Illinois. The memorial is maintained by the Chicago Police Department Honor Guard and is intended to honor 585 CPD officers who died in the line of duty. The memorial was dedicated in 2006 by the Chicago Police Memorial Foundation.

== See also ==
- List of public art in Chicago
