= Children's Fountain =

Fountain and sculpture in Chicago, Illinois, U.S.

- The fountain in 2023
- Location: Chicago, Illinois, U.S.
- 41°54′40.9″N 87°37′53.2″W

Children's Fountain is a fountain in Chicago's Lincoln Park, in the U.S. state of Illinois. It was created in 1982 and installed in 2005.

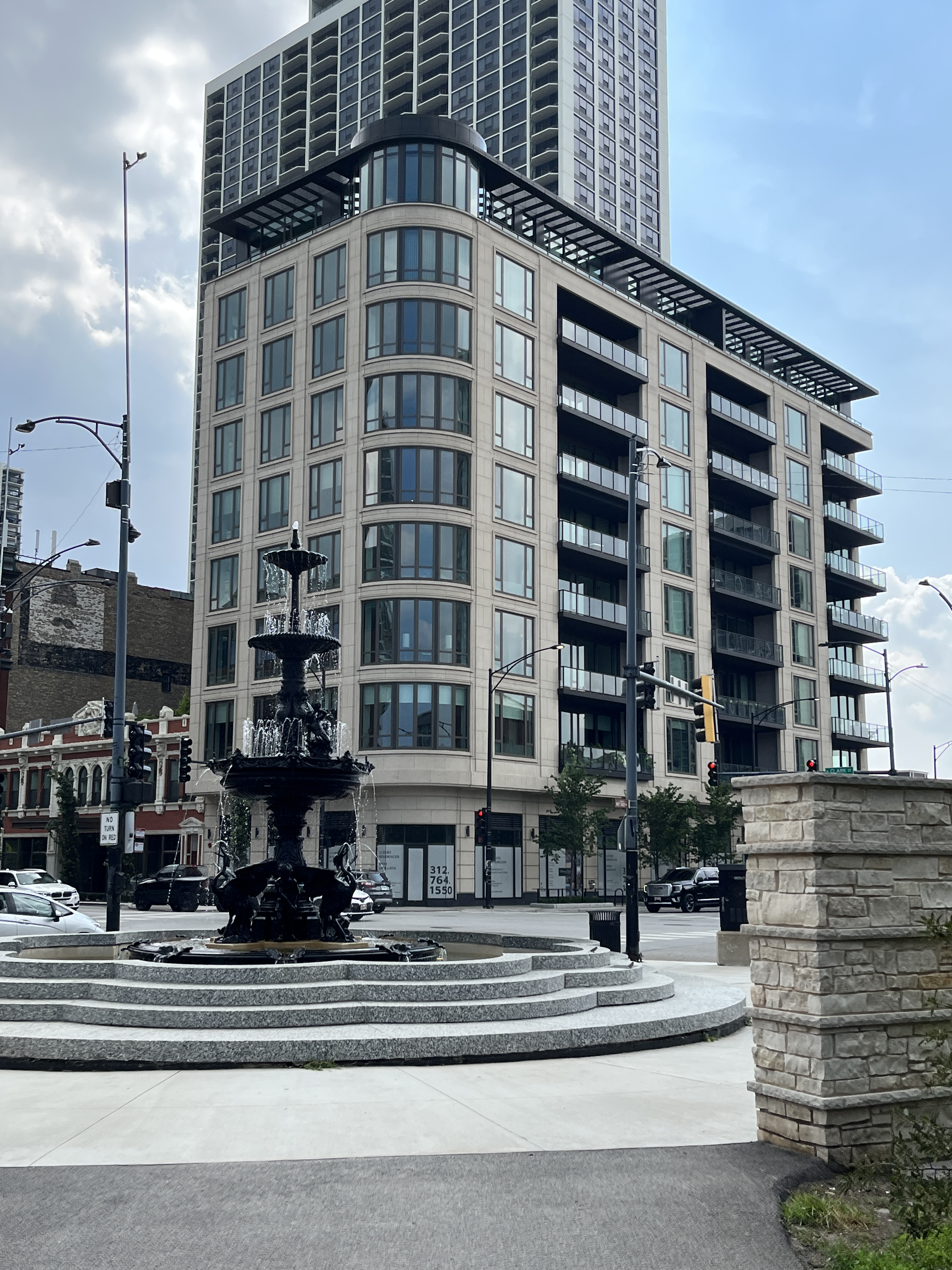

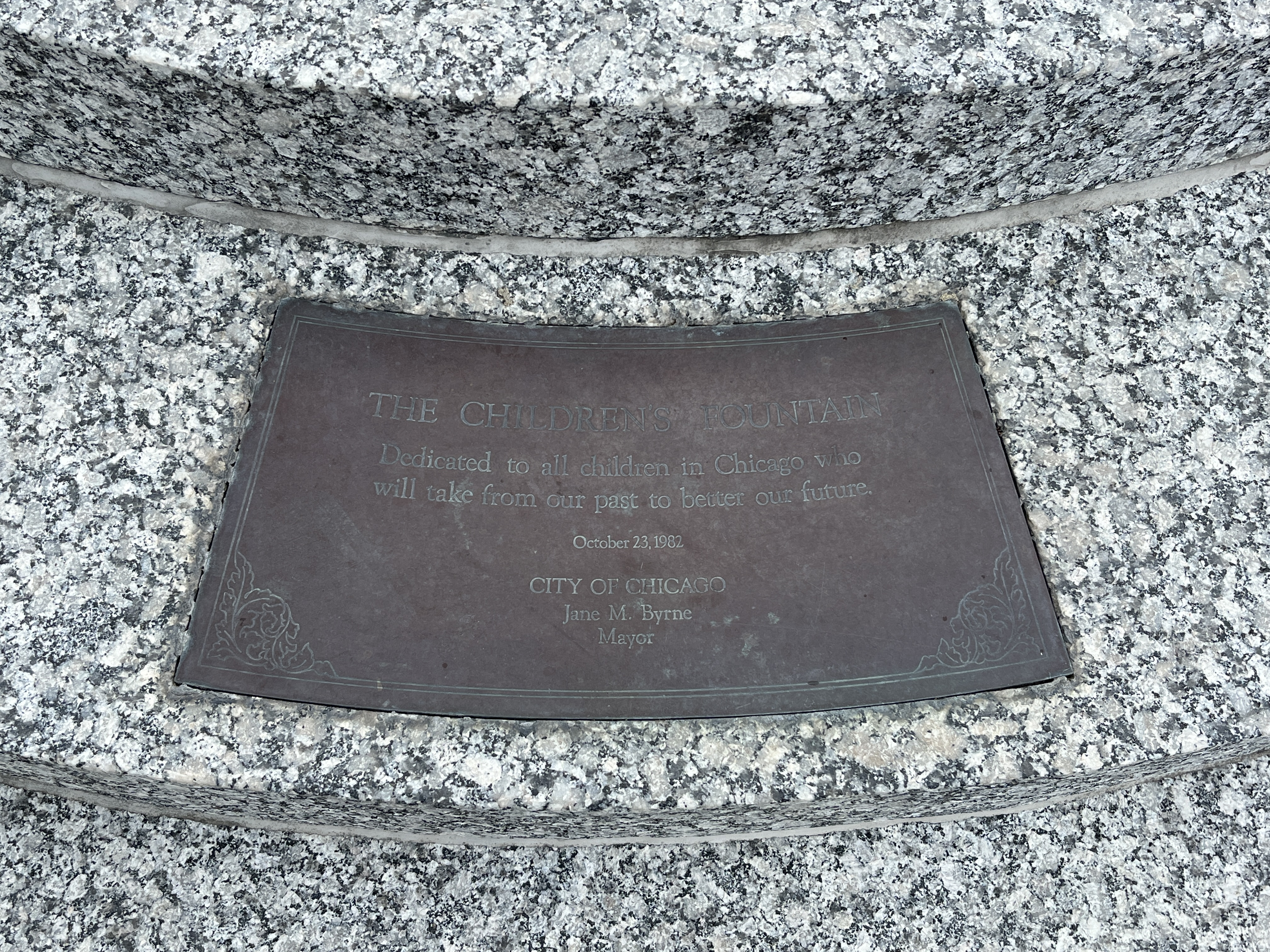
Plaque
