= Statue of Carl Linnaeus =

Monument in Chicago, Illinois, U.S.

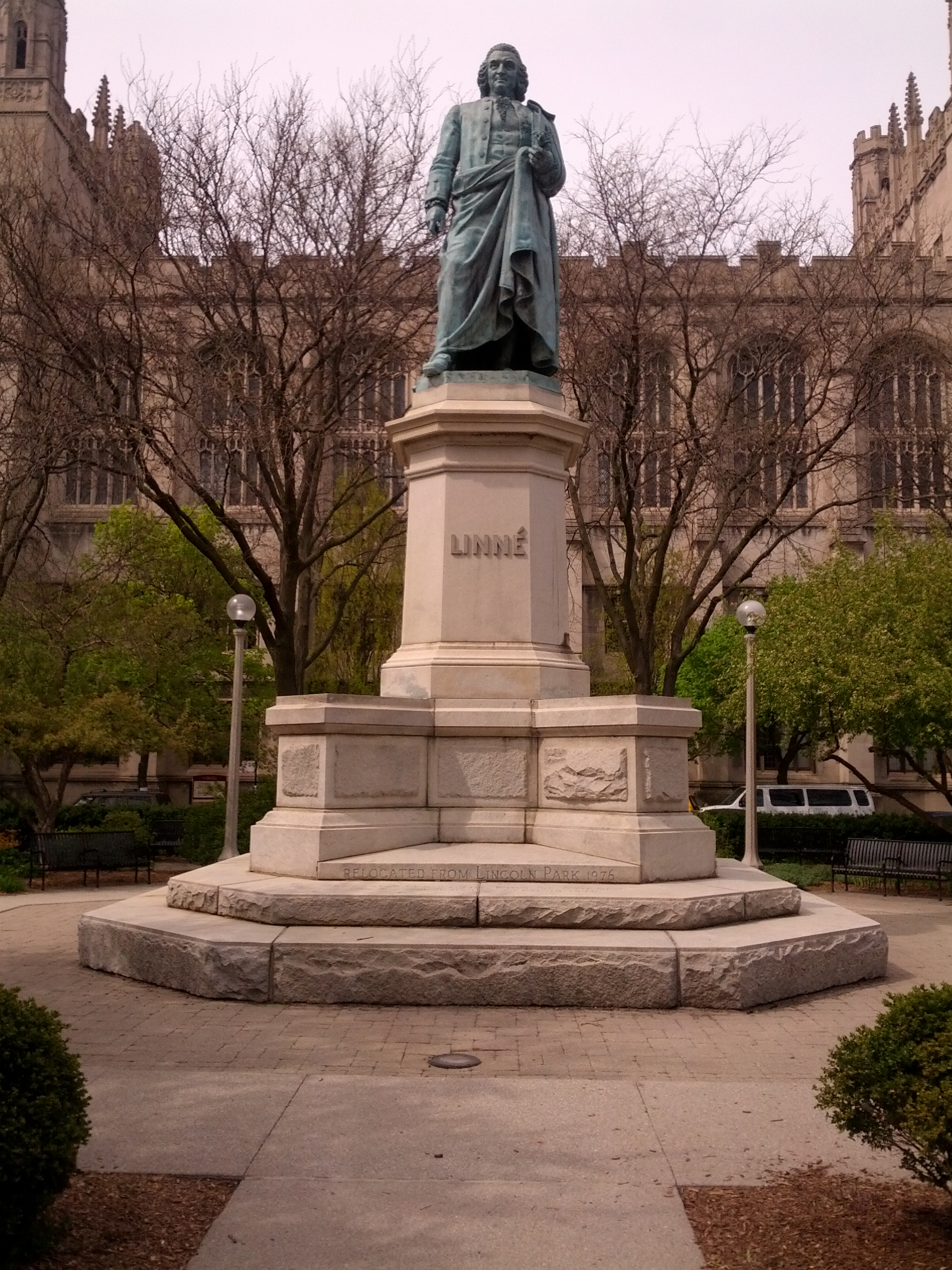
- The statue in 2013
- Artist: Frithiof Kjellberg
- Medium: Bronze sculpture; granite (base)
- Subject: Carl Linnaeus
- Location: Chicago, Illinois, U.S.; 41.7875°N 87.5996°W

A statue of Carl Linnaeus, sometimes called the Carl von Linné Monument, is a 1891 sculpture by Frithiof Kjellberg, installed in the Midway Plaisance in Chicago, Illinois, United States. It has a bronze sculpture on a granite base.

== See also ==
- Commemoration of Carl Linnaeus
