= Ludovico de Luigi =

Italian sculptor and painter

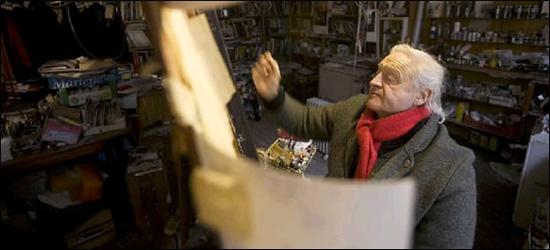
Ludovico de Luigi

Ludovico De Luigi (born 11 November 1933) is a contemporary Italian sculptor and painter born and living in Venice, Italy.

== Career ==
De Luigi's first exhibition was in 1965 with his one-man show at the Gallery "Il Canale" in Venice which included two large works, views of a decaying and monumental Venice invaded by waves of insects and fantastical beings. Upon meeting with the gallery owner Luciano Ravagnan in 1968, De Luigi's exhibition activity increased in Venice and abroad. There were exhibitions in Trieste, Milan, New York, Munich, Monte Carlo, Paris and, beginning in 1975, in many German cities.

Alongside works with themes of Vedutism and entomology, he depicted threats which menace Venice: flood water, pollution, technology, and consumerism. Venice is represented in surreal visions, catastrophic, sensual or decadent, using an oil technique; the "electronic brush" of the computer is used later.

In the 1980s De Luigi produced sculptures, including enormous bronze horses inspired by the famous Triumphal Quadriga of St Mark's Basilica. De Luigi's horses are now in the squares of Marseille, St. Louis, Chicago, Denver, Perth and Bolzano. As of 2004, two of the horses were installed in the lobby of the Adam's Mark hotel in Saint Louis. For the Venice Carnival of 1990 he created a huge chocolate horse of the same dimensions. In 1999 he sculpted one in Murano glass.

== Exhibitions ==
1965

- Galleria II Canale, Venezia

1966

- Galleria II Traghetto 2, Venezia

1967

- Drake Gallery, Chicago

1968

- Galleria II Cannocchiale, Milano

1969

- Palazzo Costanzi VII° Festival Internazionale del Film di Fantascienza, Trieste

1970

- Galleria S. Stefano, Venezia
- Galleria d´Arte Moderna Ravagnan, Venezia
- Galleria del Sagittario, Milano
- GalleriaTraghetto, Venezia

1971

- Columbia University: Casa Italiana, New York

1973

- Galerie Margot Delfs, Munich

1974

- La Pagode, Paris
- Kubus, Hannover
- One man GalleriaTommaseo, Trieste

1975

- Galleria Quarta Dimensione, Arezzo
- Galleria d'Arte Moderna Ravagnan, Venezia
- Istituto Italiano di Cultura, Cologne
- Foyer des Grossen Hauses der Städt. Bühnen, Dortmund
- Schulzentrum, Ludwigshafen am Rhein
- Galerie Hennemann, Bonn
- Kreissparkasse, Porz (Cologne)
- Heimvolkshochschule, Lambrecht
- Galerie Hennemann, Bonn
- Galerie Hennemann, Bonn

1976

- Palazzo Braschi, Roma
- Galerie Moderne Art, Baldham
- Galerie Anastasia, Bensberg-Refrath
- Istituto Italiano di Cultura, Munich
- Kunstverein, Ingolstadt
- Gartensaal des Kursaalgebaudes, Bad Mergentheim
- Foyer des Stadttheaters, Münster
- Adebakademia, Mannheim
- Galerie Augustinum, Heidelberg
- Galerie Augustinum, Stuttgart
- Atelier für Kunstwissen, Baden-Baden

1978

- Musee du Bastion, Antibes
- Galerie Schmidel, Cologne
- Palazzo delle Prigioni Vecchie, Venezia

1979

- Galerie Konok, Saint-Etienne
- Museo de Arte Contemporaneo, Sevilla
- Museo de Arte Contemporaneo, Granada
- La casa de los Toros, Valencia

1980

- Museo de l’Atarazanas, Barcelona
- Galerie "89", Barcelona
- Fundació Joan Miró, Barcelona
- Foro de Arte Contemporaneo, Mexico City

1982

- Galleria Ravagnan, Venezia
- Galerie L´Eglantine, Lausanne

1983

- Palazzo Bagatti Valsecchi, Milan
- Galleria d´Arte Braidense, Milan
- Archives Municipals, Marseille
- Hotel de Ville, La Seyne Briancon

1984

- CKO, Oostend
- Padiglione del Parco Massari, Ferrara

1985

- Ca' Vendramin Calergi (S.I.M.A.), Venezia
- "Scultura in tre tempi", Caffe Florian, Venezia
- Galerie du Vieux Villeneuve, Villeneuve

1986

- Museo de Arte Contemporaneo, Caracas
- Financial Place, Chicago
- Monument Main Lobby, 440 South La Salle, Chicago

1987

- Adam's Mark Gallery, Saint Louis
- Venice Design Art Gallery, Venezia
- GalleriaTreviso Artigiana
- Istituto Italiano di Cultura, Zagreb

1988

- Carrefour des Arts "Couvent du Refuge", Marseille
- Galleria d'Arte Moderna Ravagnan, Venezia
- "Ai Padovani", Carnevale dei Pittori, Venezia
- Palazzo delle Prigioni Vecchie, Venezia
- Galerie Francis, Gstaad
- "Ciasa de Ra Regoles", Cortina d’Ampezzo

1989

- Banca Popolare di Milano, Bergamo
- Galleria Giraldo, Treviso
- Galleria Opera, Belluno
- Galleria Il Traghetto, Venezia
- Premio Colonnette, Venezia
- Club Malvasia Vecchia, Venezia
- Studio Paolo Barozzi, Venezia

1990

- La Terrazza Cortina d'Ampezzo
- Galleria Traghetto II, Venezia

1994

- Art Fair, Gaunt
- Performance "Gondola Anfibia Carnevale di Venezia", Venezia

1995

- Caffe Quadri "Nuova Quadrigaper la Basilica di S. Marco", Venezia
- Torre Orologio Permanent Show, Venezia

1996

- Galerie Cadrama, Martigny
- Tonino Gallery, Campione d’Italia

1997

- Exposition Europa, Skulptur, Wiener Neustadt

1998

- Swisscom Center, Martigny

1999

- "Diamond-Marcus" Equestre monumentale in vetro di Murano, Venezia

2002

- Museo d´Arte Sant´Apollonia, Venezia
- Presentazione libro dell´artista "Palazzo Ducale", Venezia

2004

- Esposizione permanete Farnesina, Roma

2005

- Espace Pierre Cardin, Paris
- Contemporary Art at the Italian Pavilion Expo Aichi, Giappone

2006

- Spectrum Gallery "Impossible Venice", London
- Italian Cultural Institute, London
- Schloss Seefeld, Germany
- Galleria d'Arte Moderna Ravagnan, Venezia

2007

- Venezia Impossibile, Museu Da Agua, Lisbon

2013

- Fondazione Bevilacqua La Masa, Venezia
