= Statue of John Peter Altgeld =

Monument in Chicago, Illinois, U.S.

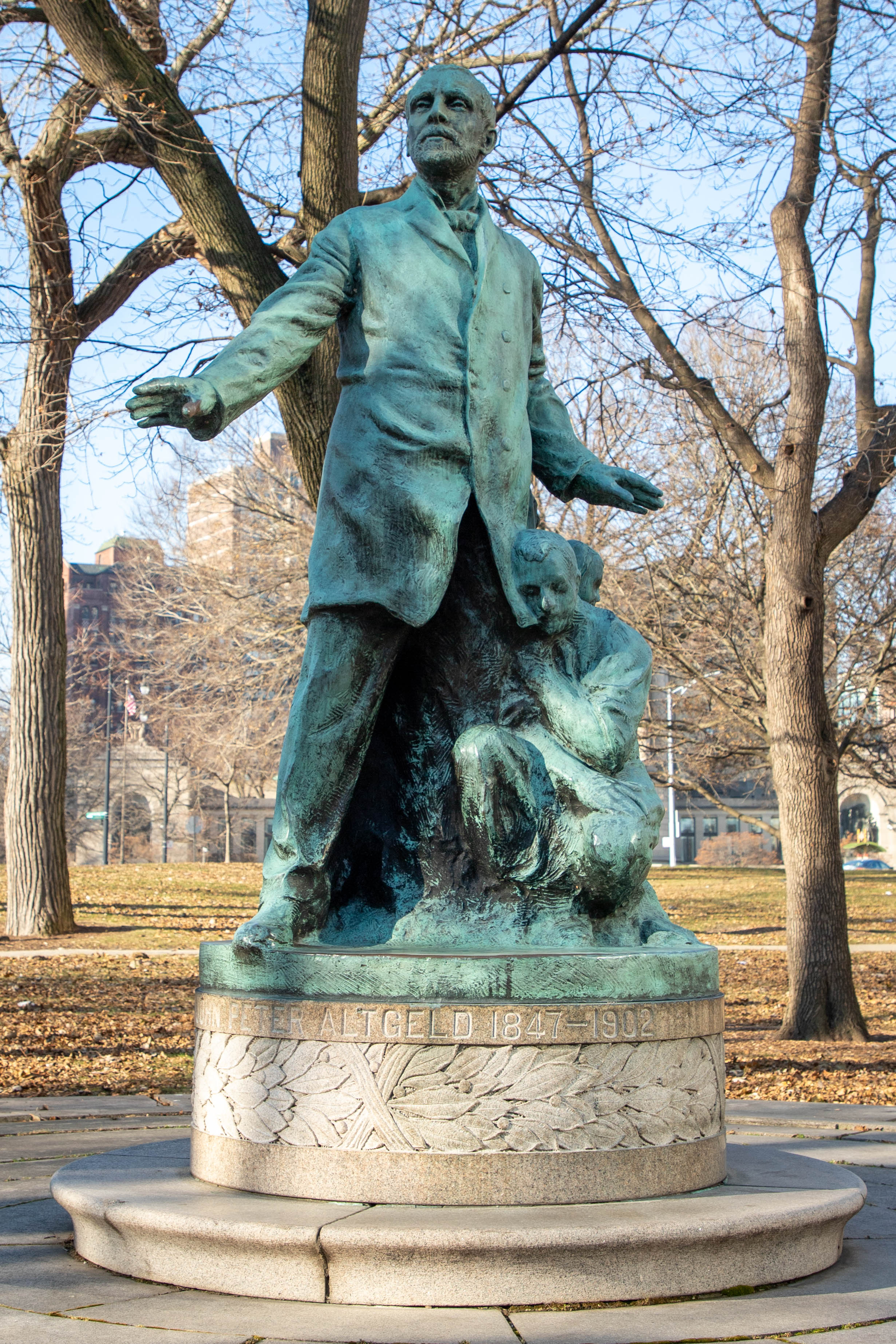
- The statue in 2019
- Subject: John Peter Altgeld
- Location: Chicago, Illinois, U.S.; 41°55′55.9″N 87°38′15.1″W

A statue of John Peter Altgeld, sometimes called the John Peter Altgeld Monument, is installed in Chicago's Lincoln Park, in the U.S. state of Illinois. The work by Gutzon Borglum was installed in 1915.
