= Harris Bank Fountain =

Public artwork in Chicago, Illinois, U.S.

- The fountain in 2026]
- Location: Chicago, Illinois, U.S.; 41°52′50″N 87°37′54.4″W

Harris Bank Fountain is a fountain and sculpture by Russell Secrest in Chicago, Illinois, United States. Installed on a plaza outside the Harris Bank building in downtown Chicago since the 1970s, the bronze fountain sits on a circular granite base with a diameter of 22 feet.
