= Fountain Girl =

Fountain and sculpture in Chicago, Illinois, U.S.

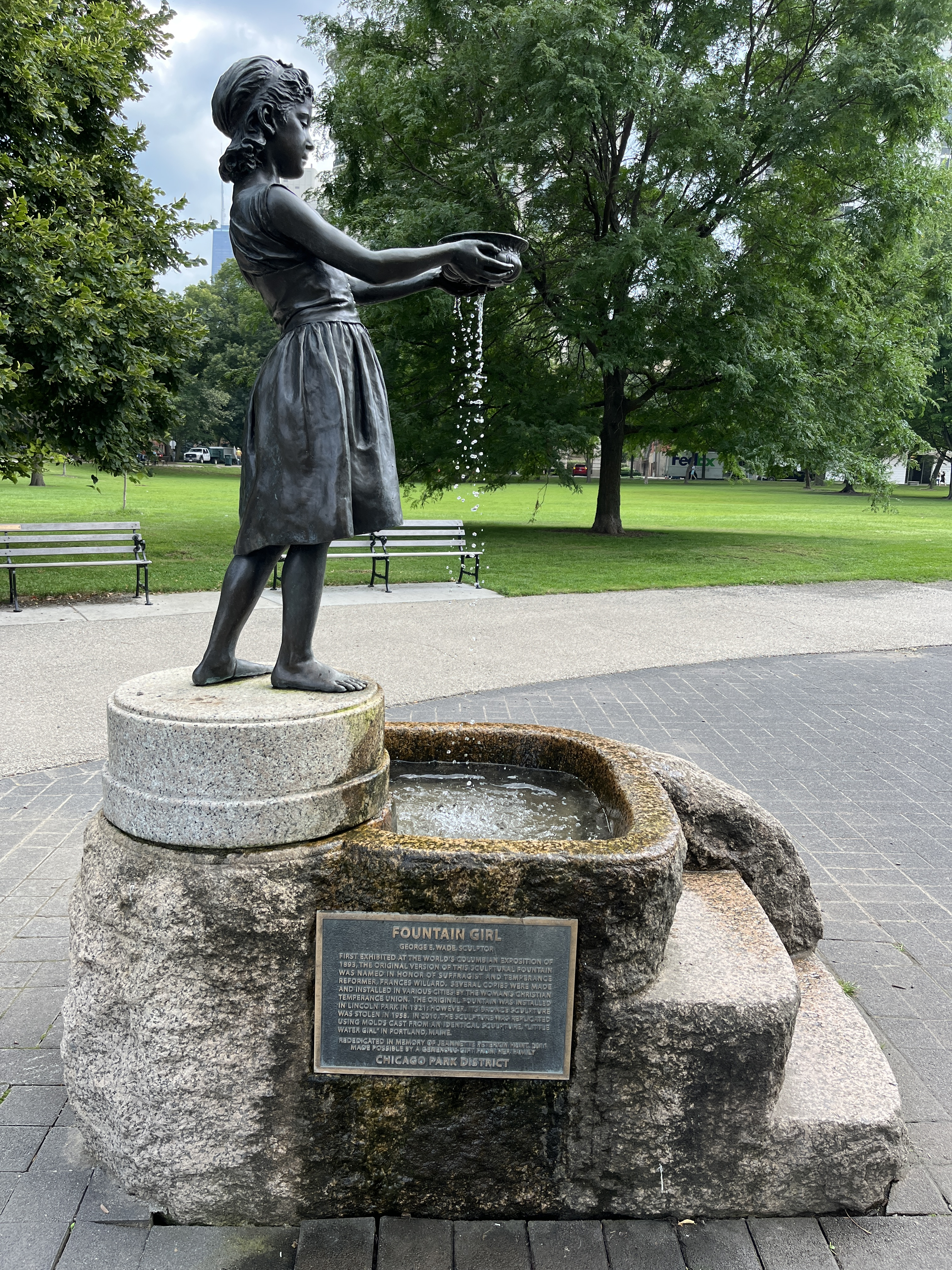
- The fountain in 2023
- Location: Chicago, Illinois, U.S.
- 41°54′43.8″N 87°37′45.9″W

Fountain Girl (also known as the Frances Willard Fountain and the Little Cold Water Girl) is a fountain and sculpture in Chicago's Lincoln Park, in the U.S. state of Illinois.

The work was created by George Wade in 1893 and originally displayed at the World's Columbian Exposition. After the Fair, the sculpture was moved to downtown Chicago in front of the Women's Hall, where it sat until that building was torn down. It was then re-erected in Lincoln Park, and moved to its current location when Lake Shore Drive was reconstructed in 1940.

Around 1958, the sculpture was stolen. It was finally replaced in 2010, using a mold cast from an identical sculpture in Portland, Maine. In addition to this statue and the one in Portland, identical versions were created for Detroit and London; the London version, in Victoria Embankment Gardens, was also stolen and later re-erected using the Portland statue as its guide.
