= Graffiti in Chicago =

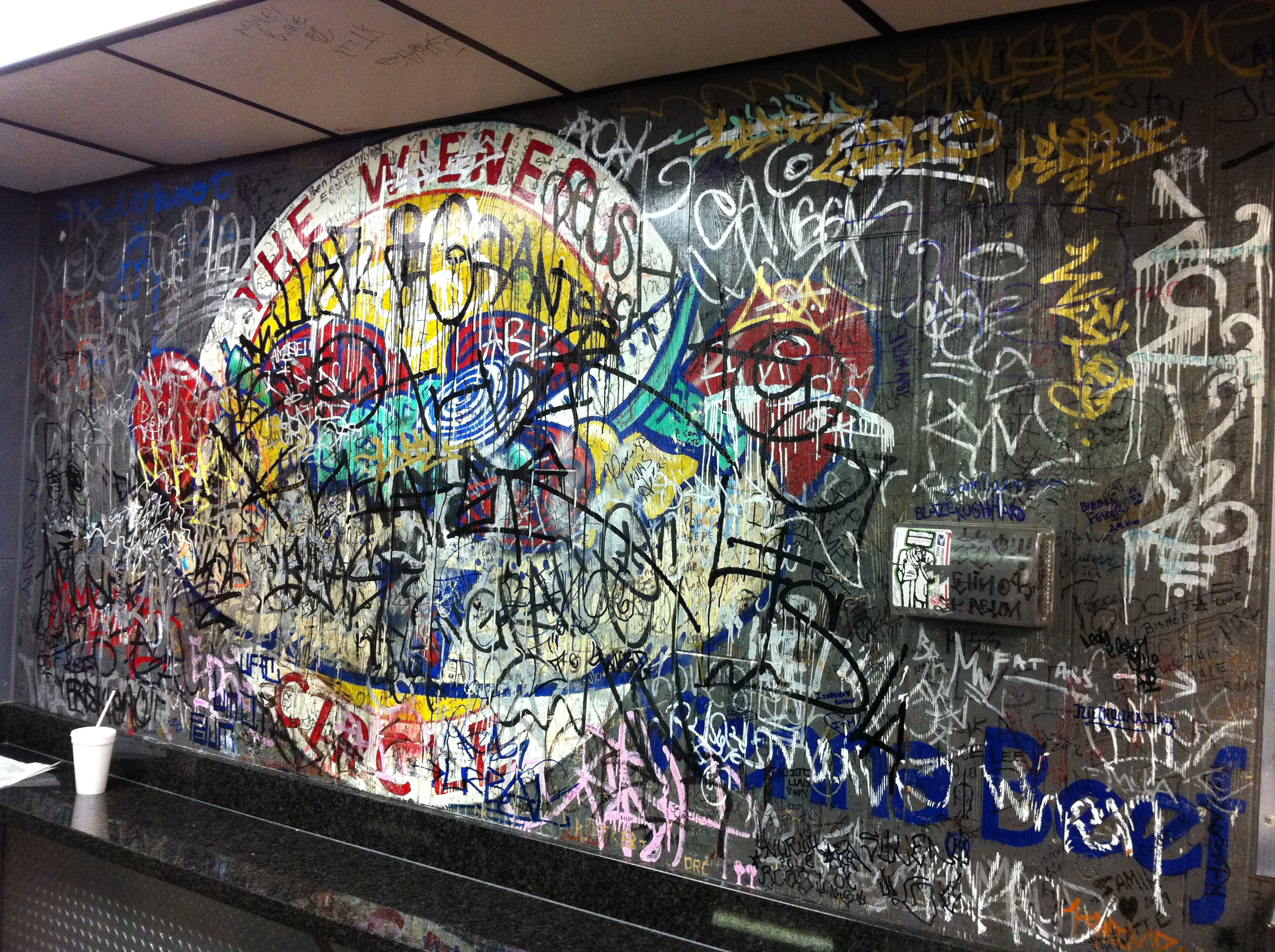
Graffiti inside The Wieners Circle

Graffiti is a cause of disagreement among residents of Chicago, in the U.S. state of Illinois. The Jane Byrne Interchange has been described as a "hot spot" for graffiti. The Illinois Department of Transportation spends hundreds of thousands of dollars on graffiti removal annually.
