= Bust of Emanuel Swedenborg =

Sculpture in Chicago, Illinois, U.S.

- Subject: Emanuel Swedenborg
- Location: Chicago, Illinois, U.S.; 41°55′53.3″N 87°37′54.1″W

A bust of Emanuel Swedenborg, sometimes called the Emanuel Swedenborg Monument, is installed in Chicago's Lincoln Park, in the U.S. state of Illinois. The sculpture by Adolff Jonnson was installed in 1924 and relocated in 2012.
