= Mural of Robin Williams =

Mural in Chicago, Illinois, U.S.

- Year: 2018
- Subject: Robin Williams
- Location: Chicago, Illinois, U.S.; 41°55′8″N 87°41′24″W

A mural of Robin Williams was painted on the north exterior of Chicago's Concord Music Hall, in the U.S. state of Illinois, in 2018. The large painting depicts Williams, who was born in Chicago, in black and white, as well as multiple identical eyeless versions of the Genie character he voiced in Disney's Aladdin franchise. It was a collaboration between New York street artist Jerkface and New Zealand artist Owen Dippie. The artists had discussed the project for several years while searching for a suitable wall in Chicago and coordinating internationally. They completed the mural over ten days in September 2018.

== Reception ==
The mural won the Best Mural category in Chicago Reader's 'Best of Chicago' readers' poll in 2019 and 2021. It was runner-up in the 2022 poll. Some viewers interpreted the mural as a comment on suicide prevention, although Dippie's manager said its completion during National Suicide Prevention Month was coincidental.
