= 8th Street Fountain =

Fountain in Chicago, Illinois, U.S.

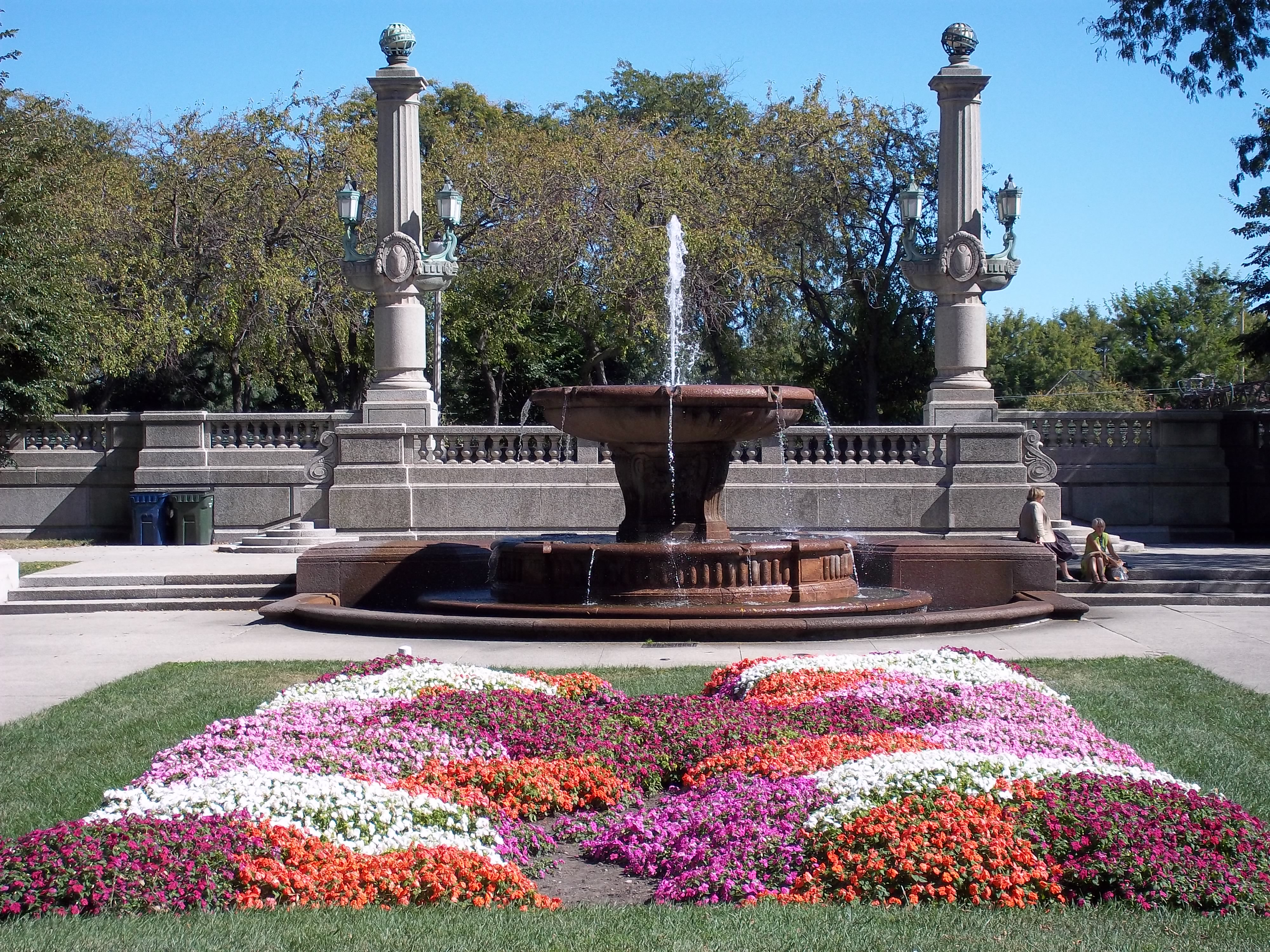
- The fountain in 2010
- Year: 1927
- Location: Chicago, Illinois, United States; 41.871883°N 87.623324°W

The 8th Street Fountain was erected in 1927 and was created by architects Bennett, Parsons, and Frost. It is located in Chicago's Grant Park in the U.S. state of Illinois.

== Description and history ==
Architect and planner Edward H. Bennett was hired to complete Grant Park after the death of Daniel H. Burnham. Following Burnham's vision, Bennett's design for the park relied on a classical vocabulary with formal symmetry. The 8th Street Fountain is a more modest fountain compared to Bennett's larger Buckingham Fountain, both of which were constructed in 1927.

Originally three matching fountains were built along the Michigan Avenue edge of Grant Park. Of the three, only the 8th Street fountain still stands. Another stood at Randolph Street.

By the 1980s, much of Grant Park became neglected. Fountains stopped working, gardens were not maintained, and graffiti covered the balustrades.

In 2004, much of the north end of Grant Park was renovated to form Millennium Park.

== See also ==
- 1927 in art
