= Statue of Benjamin Franklin (Chicago) =

Statue in Chicago, Illinois, U.S.

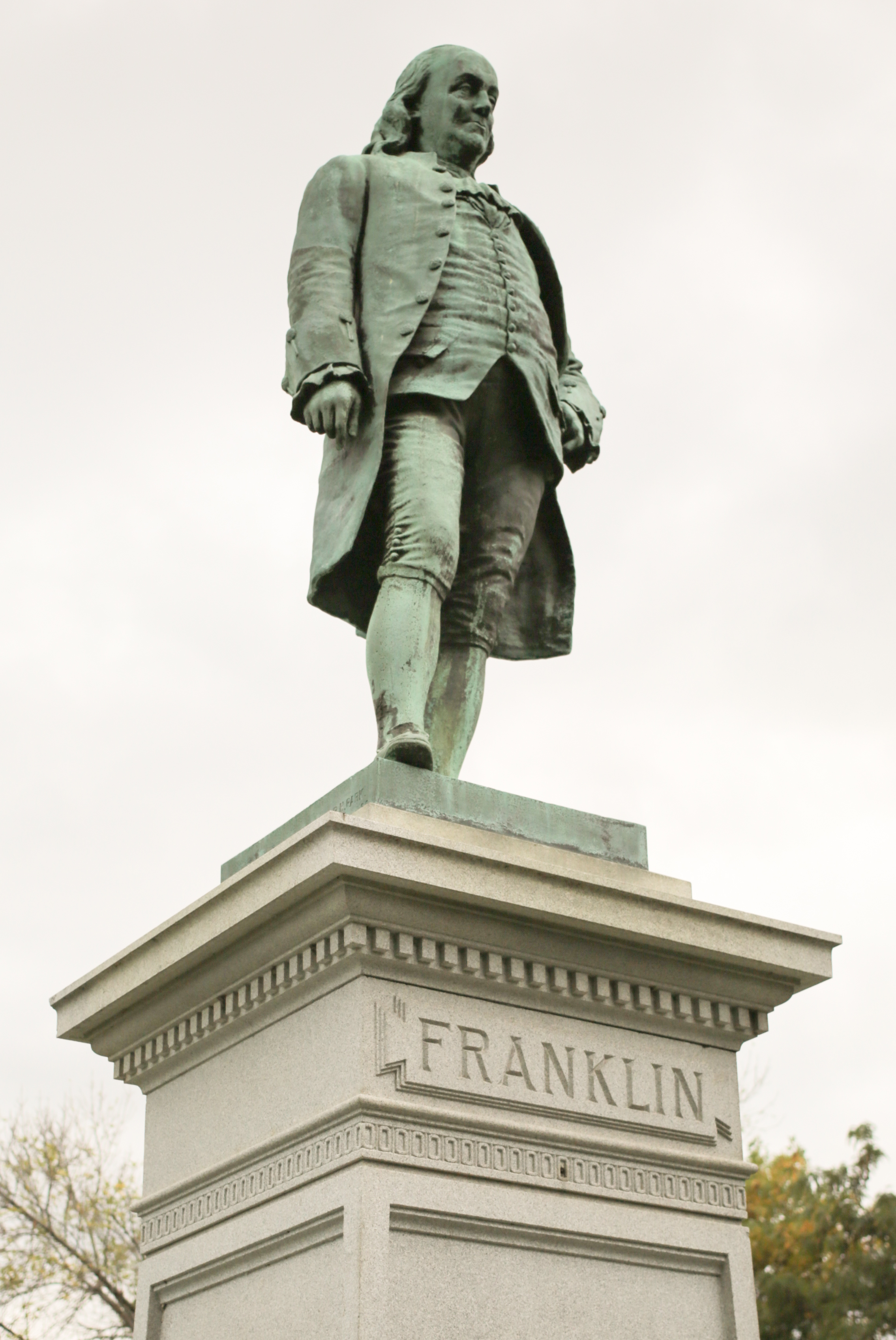
- The statue in October 2013
- Subject: Benjamin Franklin
- Location: Chicago, Illinois, U.S.; 41°54′49.7″N 87°37′51.9″W

A statue of Benjamin Franklin, known as the Benjamin Franklin Monument, is installed in Chicago's Lincoln Park, in the U.S. state of Illinois. Designed by Richard Henry Park, the work was created in 1895, installed in 1896, and relocated in 1966.
