= Siblings (sculpture) =

1997 bronze sculpture in Chicago, Illinois, U.S.

- The sculpture in 2023
- Medium: Bronze sculpture
- Location: Chicago, Illinois, U.S.
- 41°55′7″N 87°38′9.5″W

Siblings is a 1997 bronze sculpture of two mountain lions by the Colorado-based artist Rosetta, installed in Chicago's Lincoln Park, in the U.S. state of Illinois.

== See also ==
- 1997 in art
