= Large Interior Form, 1953–54 =

Sculpture series by Henry Moore

Coordinates: 41.880229°N 87.623782°W

Large Interior Form
- View facing north from Art Institute of Chicago
- Artist: Henry Moore
- Year: 1982
- Catalogue: LH 297b
- Type: Bronze
- Dimensions: 495.3 cm (195.0 in)
- Location: Art Institute of Chicago, Illinois

Large Interior Form, 1953–54 (LH 297b) is a sculpture by Henry Moore.

== History ==
It was produced in a bronze edition of six, which was first created as part of a larger work in the 1950s, and only cast as a separate work from 1981 onwards, and catalogued as LH 297b. It began as the interior component of the artist's Large Upright Internal/External Form (LH 297a), but Moore much later decided the piece worked well by itself. The artist's copy was lent in 2011 by the Henry Moore Foundation to the Snape Maltings, in Suffolk. Others are at the Art Institute of Chicago (illustrated), in an outdoor setting at the Nelson-Atkins Museum in Kansas City, Missouri. These sculptures measure 16 feet 3 inches × 56 1/4 inches × 56 1/4 inches (495.3 × 142.88 × 142.88 cm). Moore used to take pride in viewing his sculptures in the open air environment. Kunsthalle Würth at Schwabisch Hall in Germany and Trinity University in Texas are among the other locations that have Large Interior Form on public display outdoors.

== Chicago ==
The Chicago example is on display in North Stanley McCormick Memorial Court (AKA north garden) north of the Art Institute of Chicago Building in the Loop community area of Chicago, Illinois.

In Chicago, Moore has a total of four public sculptures on display that are listed on the Smithsonian Institution's Research Information System (SIRIS). He also has Nuclear Energy situated at the National Historic Landmark, National Register of Historic Places, Chicago Landmark Site of First Self-Sustaining Nuclear Reaction. Moore also has a sundial installation (visible here) outside the National Historic Landmark, National Register of Historic Places Adler Planetarium called Man Enters the Cosmos.

== See also ==
- List of sculptures by Henry Moore
- List of public art in Chicago
