= Joseph Chamberlain (planetarium director) =

Chairman of Adler Planetarium (b. 1923, d. 2011)

Joseph M. Chamberlain
- Born: July 26, 1923; Peoria, Illinois
- Died: November 28, 2011 (aged 88); Peoria, Illinois
- Occupation: Chairman of Adler Planetarium
- Spouse: Paula Jane Bruninga (m. 1945)

Joseph Miles Chamberlain (July 26, 1923 – November 28, 2011) was the chairman of Adler Planetarium.

== Biography ==
Joseph M. Chamberlain was born on July 26, 1923, in Peoria, Illinois. His parents were Maurice S. and Roberta Miles Chamberlain. He married Paula Jane Bruninga on December 12, 1945 in San Pedro, California. They had 3 daughters.

Chamberlain attended Bradley University in Peoria. He graduated from the Merchant Marine Academy in Kings Point, New York. He received his doctorate from Columbia University in New York City.

Chamberlain served in the U.S. Navy as a navigator in the Pacific Fleet during World War II.

He was hired as an assistant curator to the Rose Center for Earth and Space in 1952. In 1956, he became the chairman of the planetarium. The Adler Planetarium announced on December 11, 2011, that he died on November 28, of that year, at age 88 in Peoria, Illinois.
