= Gemini 12 =

1966 NASA crewed spaceflight

Gemini XII
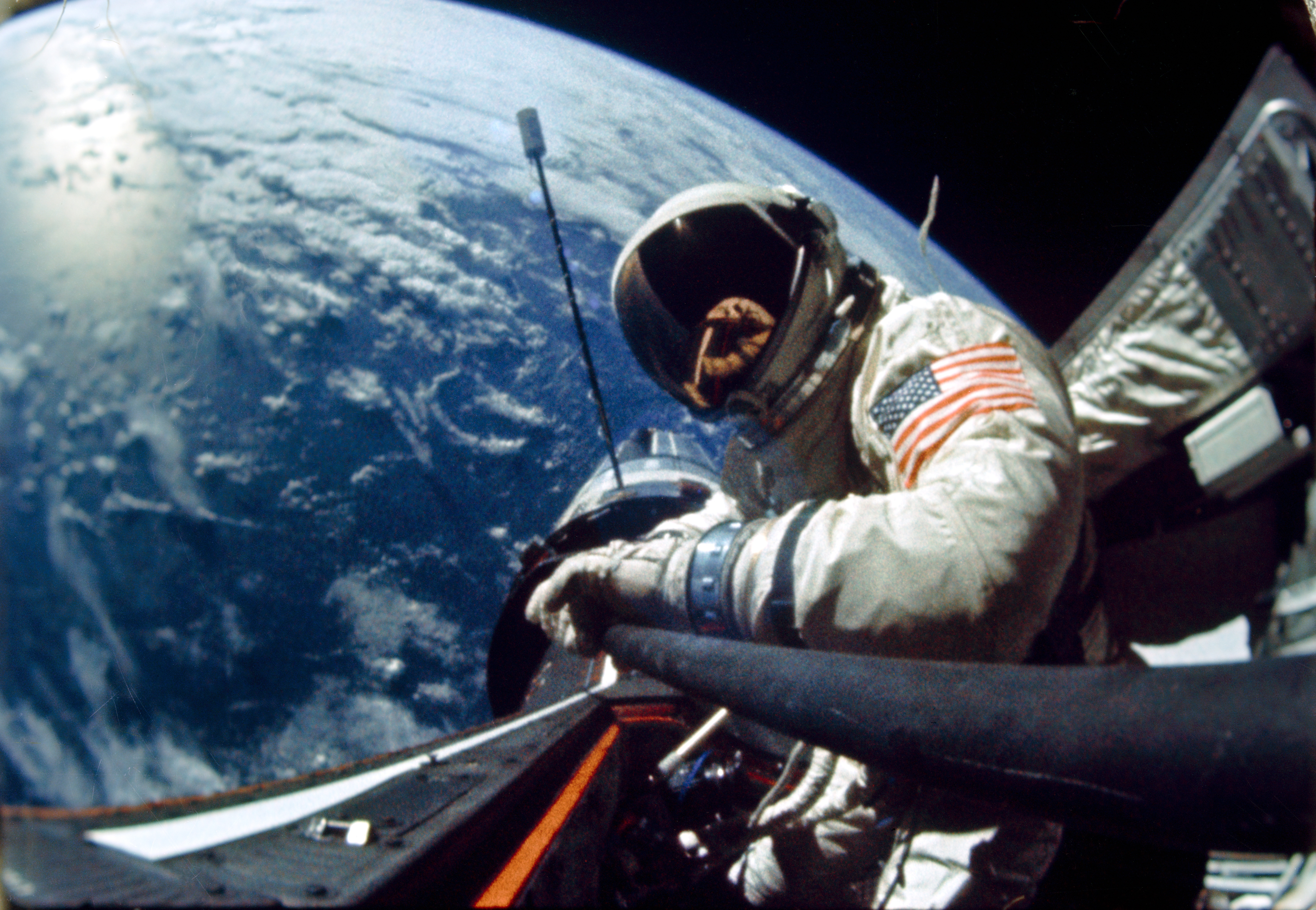
- Buzz Aldrin performs an EVA during the Gemini XII mission, with the Agena Target Vehicle visible in the background.
- Mission type: Space rendezvous; Spacecraft docking; Extravehicular activity
- Operator: NASA
- COSPAR ID: 1966-104A
- SATCAT no.: 2566
- Mission duration: 3 days, 22 hours, 34 minutes, 31 seconds
- Orbits completed: 59

Spacecraft properties
- Spacecraft: Gemini SC12
- Manufacturer: McDonnell
- Launch mass: 3,762 kilograms (8,294 lb)
- Landing mass: 1,947 kilograms (4,293 lb)

Crew
- Crew size: 2
- Members: James A. Lovell Jr.; Edwin E. "Buzz" Aldrin Jr.
- EVAs: 3
- EVA duration: 5 hours, 30 minutes

Start of mission
- Launch date: November 11, 1966, 20:46:33 UTC
- Rocket: Titan II GLV
- Launch site: Cape Kennedy LC-19

End of mission
- Recovered by: USS Wasp
- Landing date: November 15, 1966, 19:21:04 UTC
- Landing site: 24°35′N 69°57′W

Orbital parameters
- Reference system: Geocentric
- Regime: Low Earth orbit
- Perigee altitude: 251 kilometers (156 mi; 136 nmi)
- Apogee altitude: 289 kilometers (180 mi; 156 nmi)
- Inclination: 28.8 degrees
- Period: 89.94 minutes
- Epoch: November 14, 1966

Docking with GATV-5001A
- Docking date: November 12, 1966, 01:06:00 UTC
- Undocking date: November 13, 1966, 20:18:00 UTC
- Time docked: 1 day, 19 hours, 12 minutes
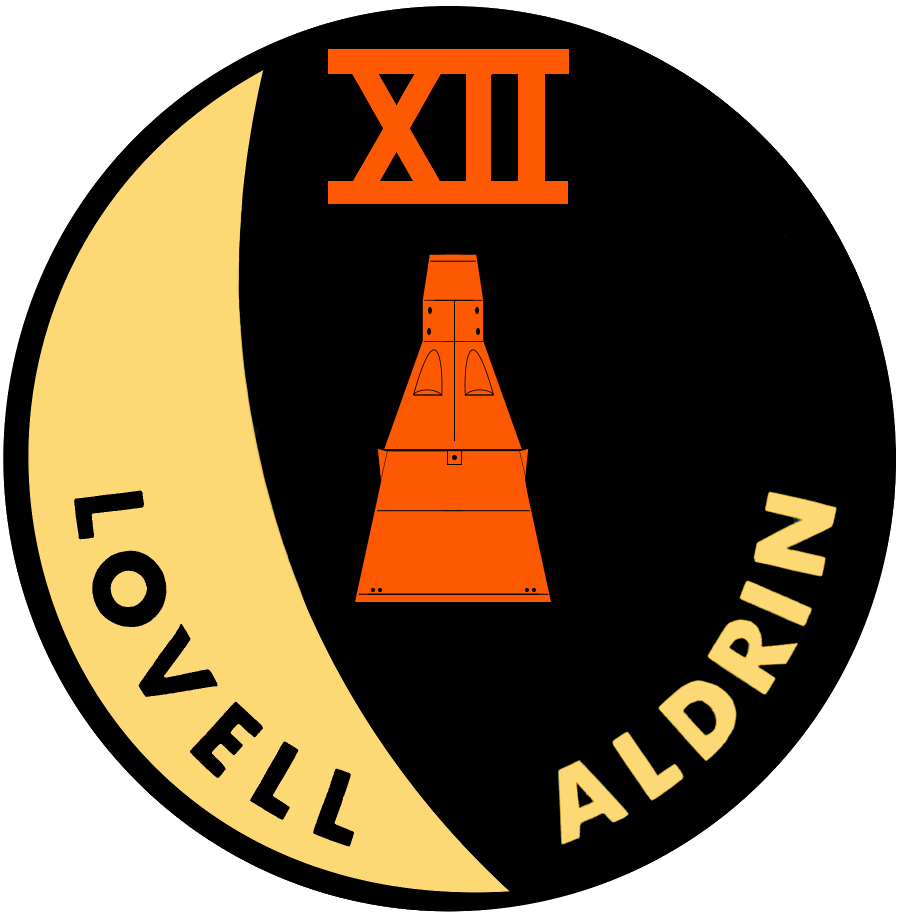
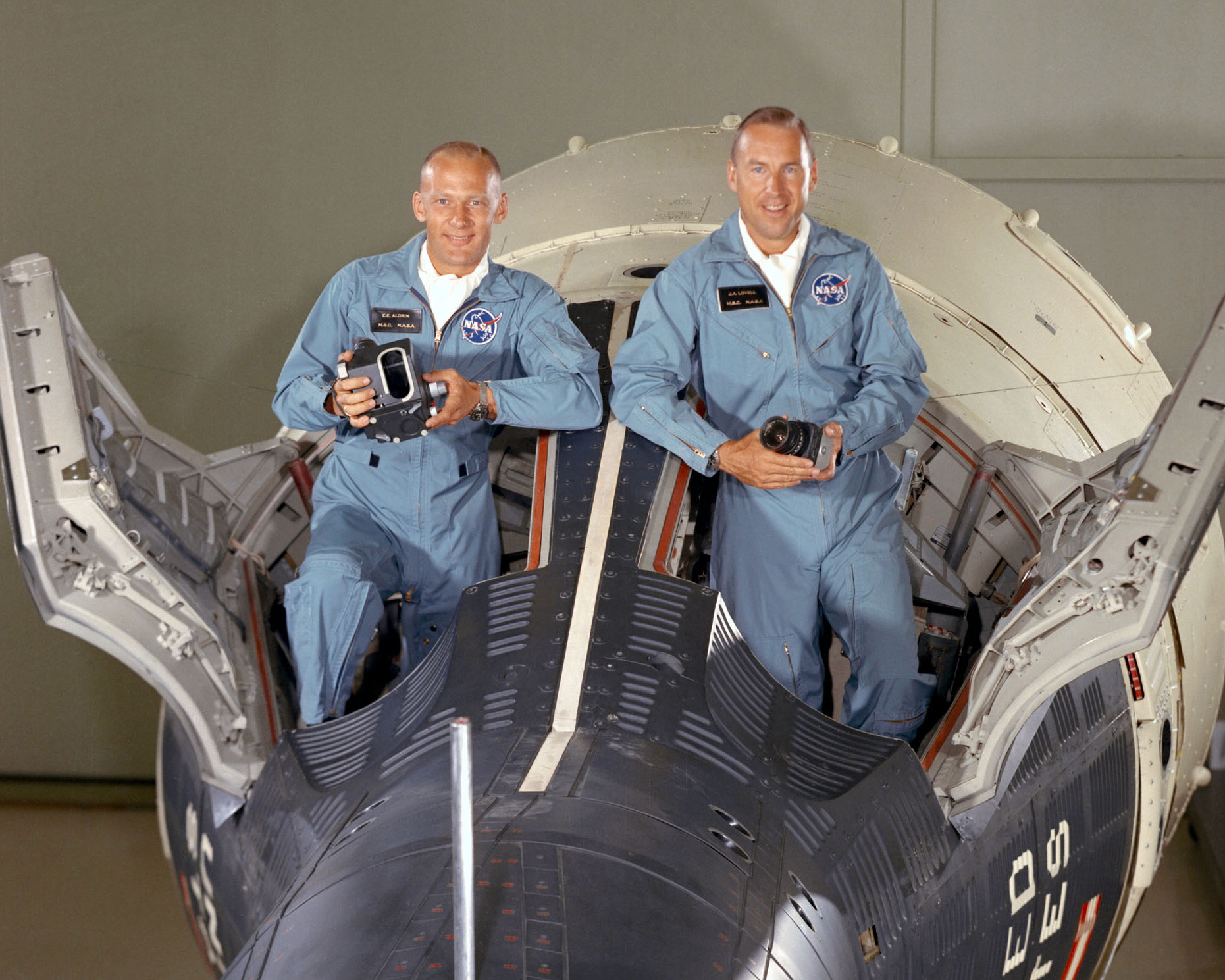
- (L-R) Aldrin, Lovell Project Gemini

Gemini 12 (officially Gemini XII) was a 1966 crewed spaceflight in NASA's Project Gemini. It was the 10th and final crewed Gemini flight (Gemini 1 and Gemini 2 were uncrewed missions), the 18th crewed American spaceflight, and the 26th spaceflight of all time, including X-15 flights over 100 kilometers (54 nmi). Commanded by Gemini VII veteran James A. Lovell, the flight featured three periods of extravehicular activity (EVA) by rookie Edwin "Buzz" Aldrin, lasting a total of 5 hours and 30 minutes. It also achieved the fifth rendezvous and fourth docking with an Agena target vehicle.

Gemini XII marked a successful conclusion of the Gemini program, achieving the last of its goals by successfully demonstrating that astronauts can effectively work outside of spacecraft. This was instrumental in paving the way for the Apollo program to achieve its goal of landing a man on the Moon by the end of the 1960s.

== Crew ==
Position	Astronaut
Command Pilot	James A. Lovell Jr. Second spaceflight
Pilot	Edwin E. "Buzz" Aldrin Jr. First spaceflight

=== Backup crew ===
Position	Astronaut
Command Pilot	L. Gordon Cooper Jr.
Pilot	Eugene A. Cernan

== Support crew ==
- Stuart A. Roosa (Cape CAPCOM)
- Charles "Pete" Conrad Jr. (Houston CAPCOM)
- William A. Anders (Houston CAPCOM)

== Mission parameters ==
- Mass: 3,762.1 kilograms (8,294 lb)
- Perigee: 160.8 kilometers (99.9 mi; 86.8 nmi)
- Apogee: 270.6 kilometers (168.1 mi; 146.1 nmi)
- Inclination: 28.87°
- Period: 88.87 min (1 hour, 28 minutes)

=== Docking ===
- Docked: November 12, 1966 – 01:06:00 UTC
- Undocked: November 13, 1966 – 20:18:00 UTC

=== Space walk ===
- Aldrin – EVA 1 – (stand up)
  - Start: November 12, 1966, 16:15:00 UTC
  - End: November 12, 1966, 18:44:00 UTC
  - Duration: 2 hours, 29 minutes
- Aldrin – EVA 2
  - Start: November 13, 1966, 15:34:00 UTC
  - End: November 13, 1966, 17:40:00 UTC
  - Duration: 2 hours, 06 minutes
- Aldrin – EVA 3 (stand up)
  - Start: November 14, 1966, 14:52:00 UTC
  - End: November 14, 1966, 15:47:00 UTC
  - Duration: 0 hours, 55 minutes

== Launch ==
Liftoff of the Atlas/Agena Target Vehicle occurred at 2:07:59 p.m. EST, and of the Gemini/Titan spacecraft at 3:46:33 p.m. EST, on November 11. This holds the record for the quickest turnaround between two orbital launches from the United States, at one hour and 39 minutes. All launch vehicle systems performed nominally during powered flight, but at staging, there was a recurrence of the first stage oxidizer tank rupture first seen on Gemini 10's launch. On Gemini 12, the fuel tank appeared to have also ruptured as a white cloud was seen emitting from the spent stage along with the orange nitrogen tetroxide. Another episode of "Green Man" also occurred at SECO, referring to pitch gyrations caused by pressure buildup in the second stage protective skirt.

== Objectives ==
At the completion of the previous Gemini flight, the program still had not demonstrated that an astronaut could work easily and efficiently outside the spacecraft. Prior to the Gemini XII mission, other astronauts from previous missions of the Gemini Program had attempted EVAs. Their successes, however, were limited due to a lack of proper restraints and insufficient techniques. In preparation for Gemini XII new, improved restraints were added to the outside of the capsule, and a new technique—underwater training—was introduced, which would become a staple of future space-walk simulation. The main purpose of the Gemini XII mission was to find and test new ways to work outside of a spacecraft safely and effectively. Aldrin's two-hour, 20-minute tethered space-walk, during which he photographed star fields, retrieved a micrometeorite collector and did other chores, at last demonstrated the feasibility of extravehicular activity. Two more stand-up EVAs also went smoothly, as did the by-now routine rendezvous and docking with an Agena which was done "manually" using the onboard computer and charts when a rendezvous radar failed. Aldrin, who had written his Doctor of Science thesis on rendezvous, used a sextant to measure the angle between the spacecraft and the Agena, and then calculated the required actions using the onboard computer. Lovell then flew the spacecraft accordingly. The climb to a higher orbit was canceled because of a problem with the Agena booster.

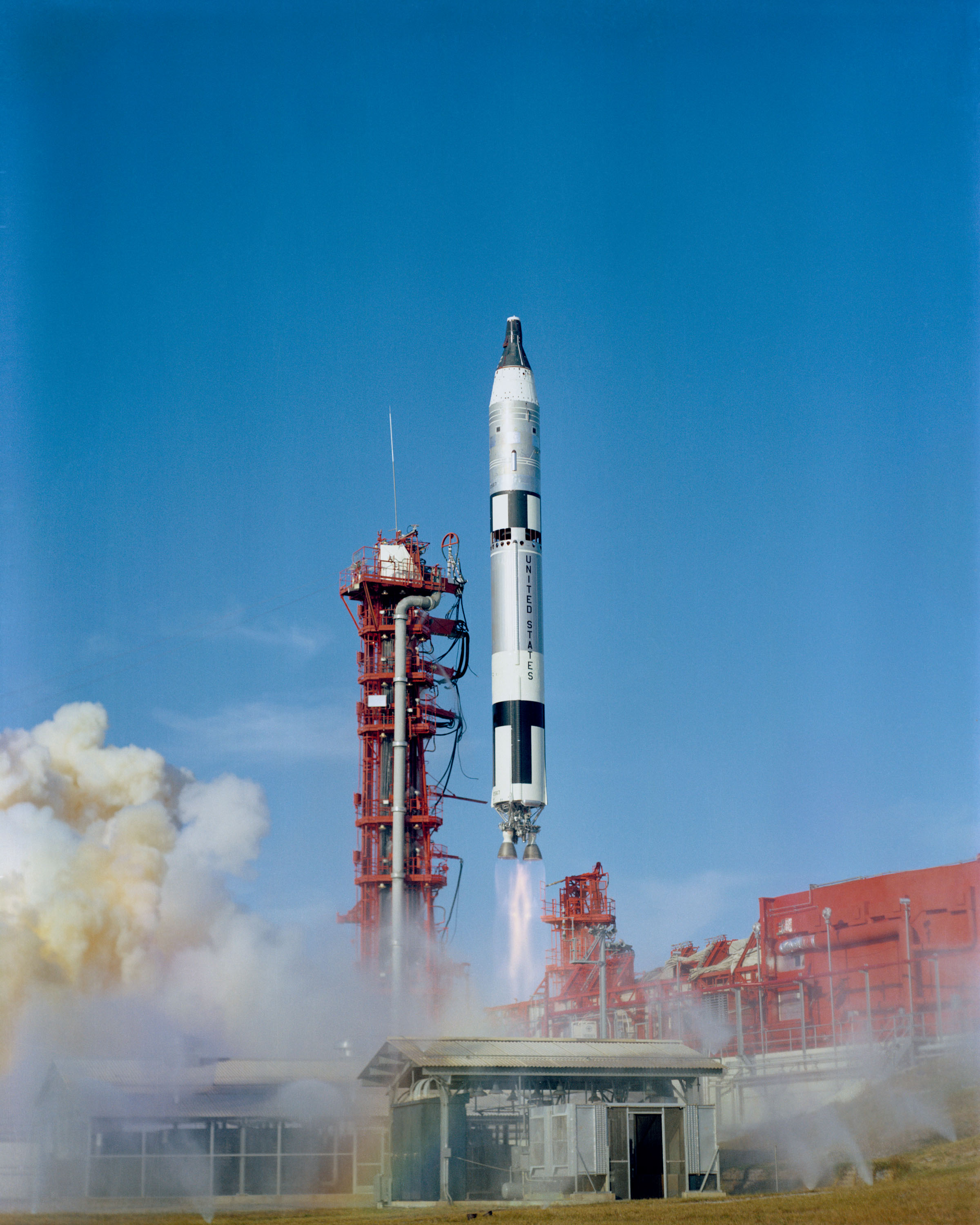
Launch of Gemini 12.

During orbital injection, the GATV engine experienced a drop in turbopump speed lasting about 2.5 seconds. After this, pump performance returned to normal. Telemetry data indicated erratic pump speeds, but engine performance did not reflect this. The anomaly was later found as a brief 30 psi drop in the thrust chamber of the rocket. The mission had planned for an orbital maneuver into a higher orbit but the drop in pressure raised some concerns. Ground controllers decided not to risk the planned orbital boost maneuver since the exact reason for the pump slowdown was unclear. Following Gemini 12's reentry and during the GATV's 63rd orbit, they attempted to fire the propulsion system, but a stuck fuel valve prevented engine start from occurring.

It was suspected that a turbopump bearing failure caused the anomalous conditions during orbital injection, followed by heating and melting of pump components. The inability of ground controllers to start the engine during the 63rd orbit was possibly due to melted or loose debris blocking the fuel valve and preventing its operation. The telemetry data falsely reporting erratic pump speed was concluded to be debris being knocked around and affecting the data probes.

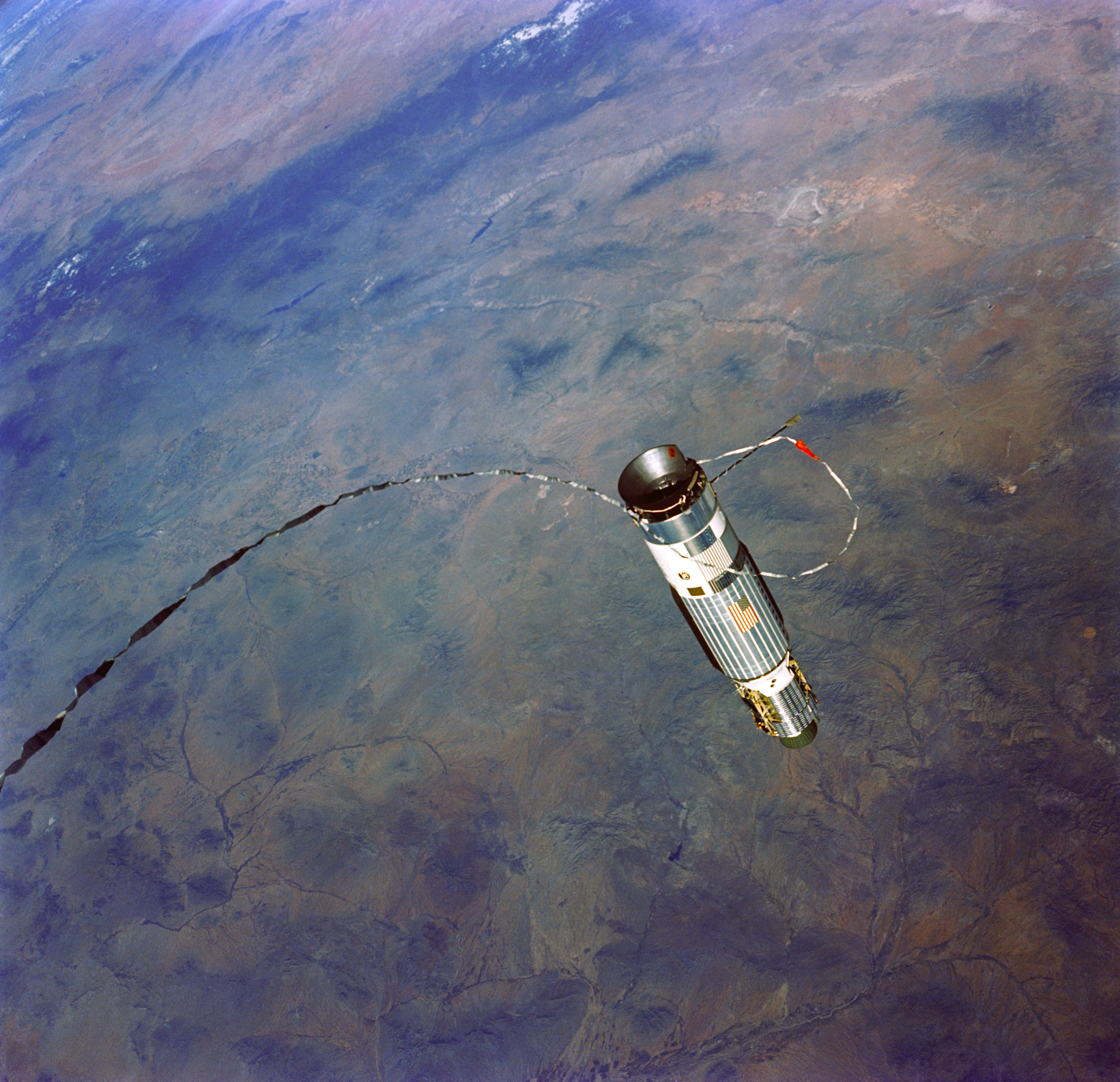
Gemini 12 tethered stationkeeping

The 1994 book and documentary Moon Shot, as well as the 2008 documentary When We Left Earth: The NASA Missions, credits the spacewalk innovations, including the underwater training, to Aldrin himself. However, the 2016 article "Inventing Underwater Training for Walking in Space," by Michael Neufeld, reveals that neutral buoyancy experimentation began at aerospace companies and at NASA Langley Research Center in Hampton, Virginia a few years before the first Gemini mission had even flown.

Gemini 12 was designed to perform rendezvous and docking with the Agena target vehicle, to conduct three extravehicular activity operations, to conduct a tethered stationkeeping exercise, to perform docked maneuvers using the Agena propulsion system to change orbit, and demonstrate an automatic reentry.

Gemini 12	Agena info
Agena	GATV-5001A
NSSDC ID:	1966-103A
Mass	3,175 kilograms (7,000 lb)
Launch site	LC-14
Launch date	November 11, 1966
Launch time	19:07:59 UTC
1st perigee	294.7 kilometres (183.1 mi)
1st apogee	303.2 kilometres (188.4 mi)
Period	90.56 m
Inclination	28.86
Reentered	November 15, 1966

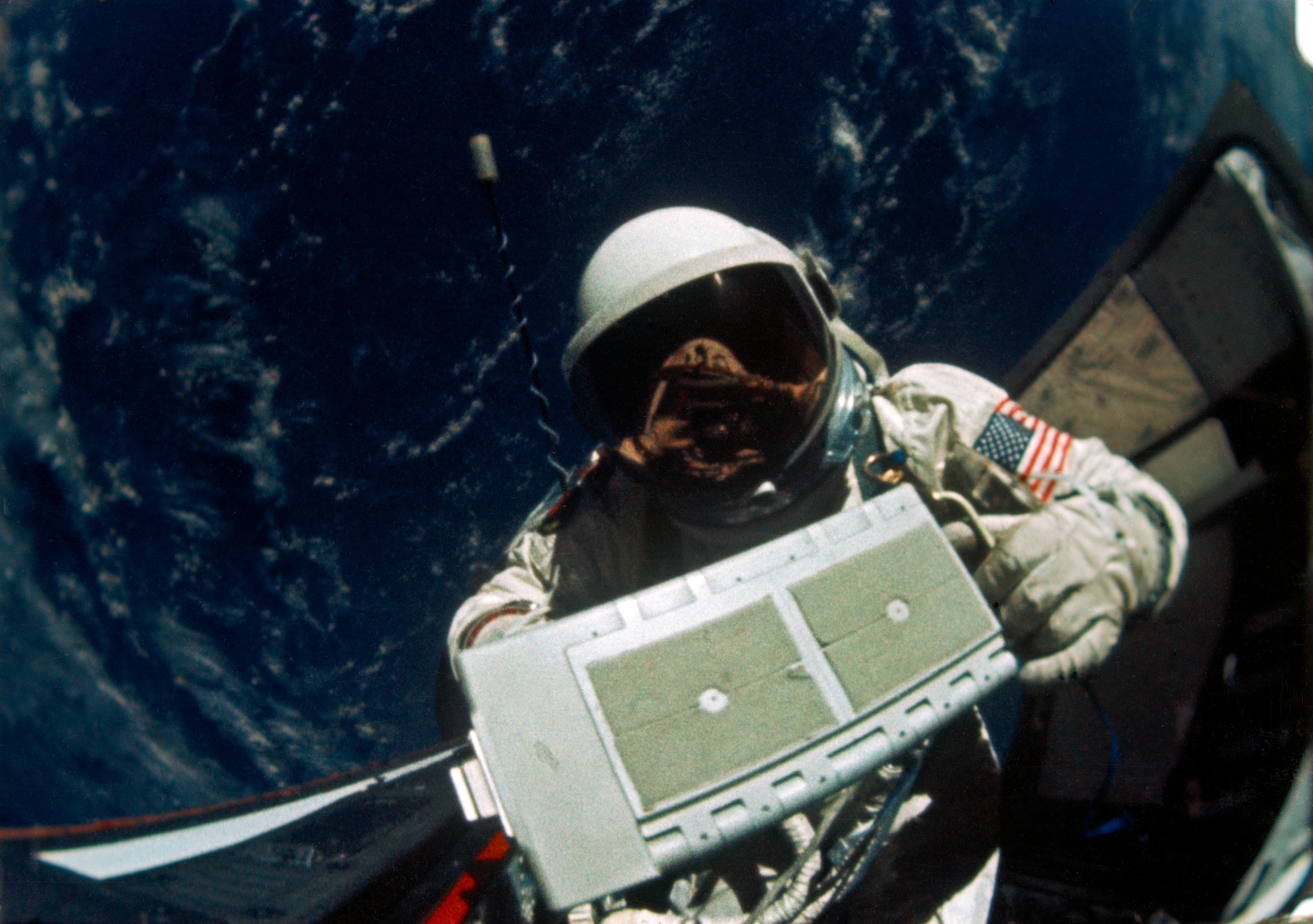
Aldrin during an EVA

When Gemini 12 was being planned, one of the possibilities raised was the potential for the flight to be run in conjunction with the first Apollo mission, which had been tentatively scheduled for the last quarter of 1966. By May 1966, delays in making Apollo ready for flight just by itself, and the extra time needed to incorporate compatibility with the Gemini, made that impractical. This became moot when slippage in readiness of the Apollo spacecraft caused the last-quarter 1966 target date to be missed, and the Apollo mission was rescheduled for February 21, 1967.

=== Experiments ===
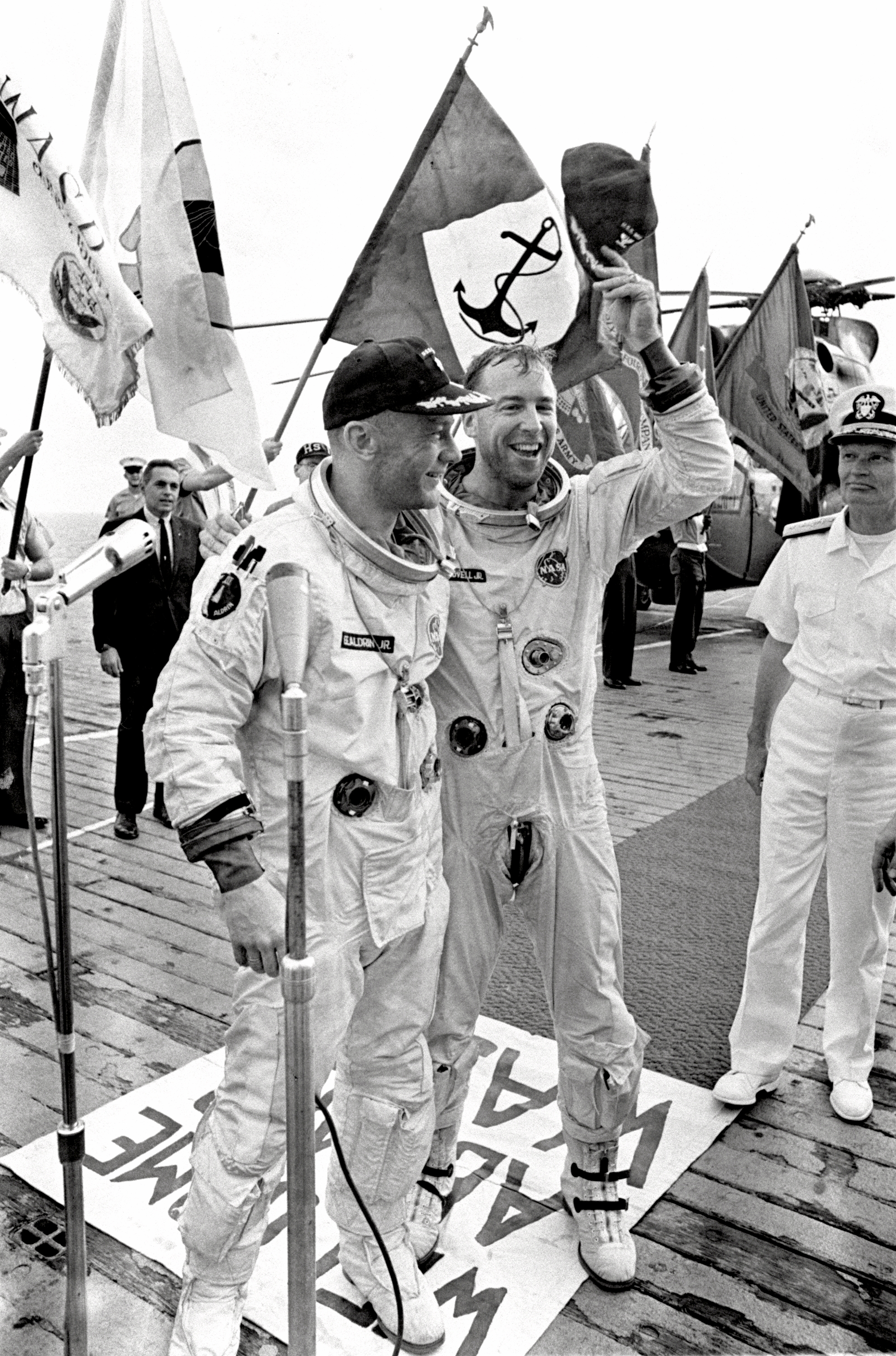
Gemini 12 crew after splashdown

The 14 scientific experiments were (1) frog egg growth under zero-g, (2) synoptic terrain photography, (3) synoptic weather photography, (4) nuclear emulsions, (5) airglow horizon photography, (6) UV astronomical photography, and (7) dim sky photography. Two micrometeorite collection experiments, as well as three space phenomena photography experiments, were not fully completed.

=== Reentry ===
The capsule was controlled on reentry by computer and splashed down 4.8 kilometers from its target. The crew were taken aboard the aircraft carrier USS Wasp.

The Gemini 12 mission was supported by the following U.S. Department of Defense resources; 9,775 personnel, 65 aircraft and 12 ships.

Postflight medical examination disclosed no unusual conditions in either astronaut. Both were slightly exhausted and dehydrated due to problems with the spacecraft's water supply system forcing them to reduce their fluid intake on the last day of the mission and Lovell had a mild case of conjunctivitis.

== Insignia ==
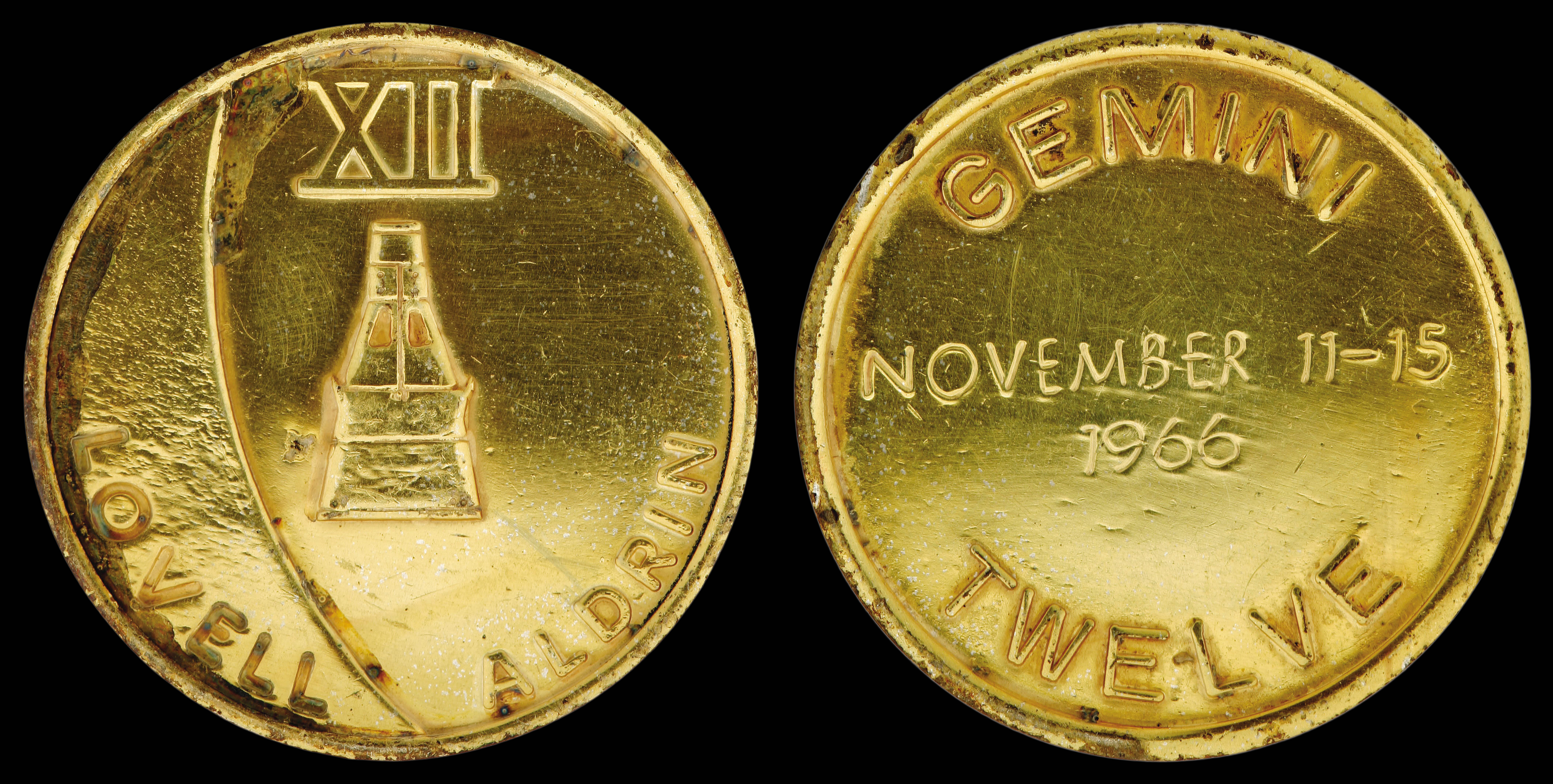
Gemini 12 space-flown Fliteline Medallion

The patch's unique orange and black colors are a link to the flight's original scheduled date close to Halloween. The Roman numeral XII is located at the 12 o'clock position on the face of a clock, with the Gemini spacecraft pointing to it like the hour hand of a clock. This represents the position of Gemini 12 as the last flight of the Gemini program. With the Apollo project following this last flight of the Gemini program, the ultimate objective—the Moon—is symbolized by the crescent on the left.

== Gallery ==
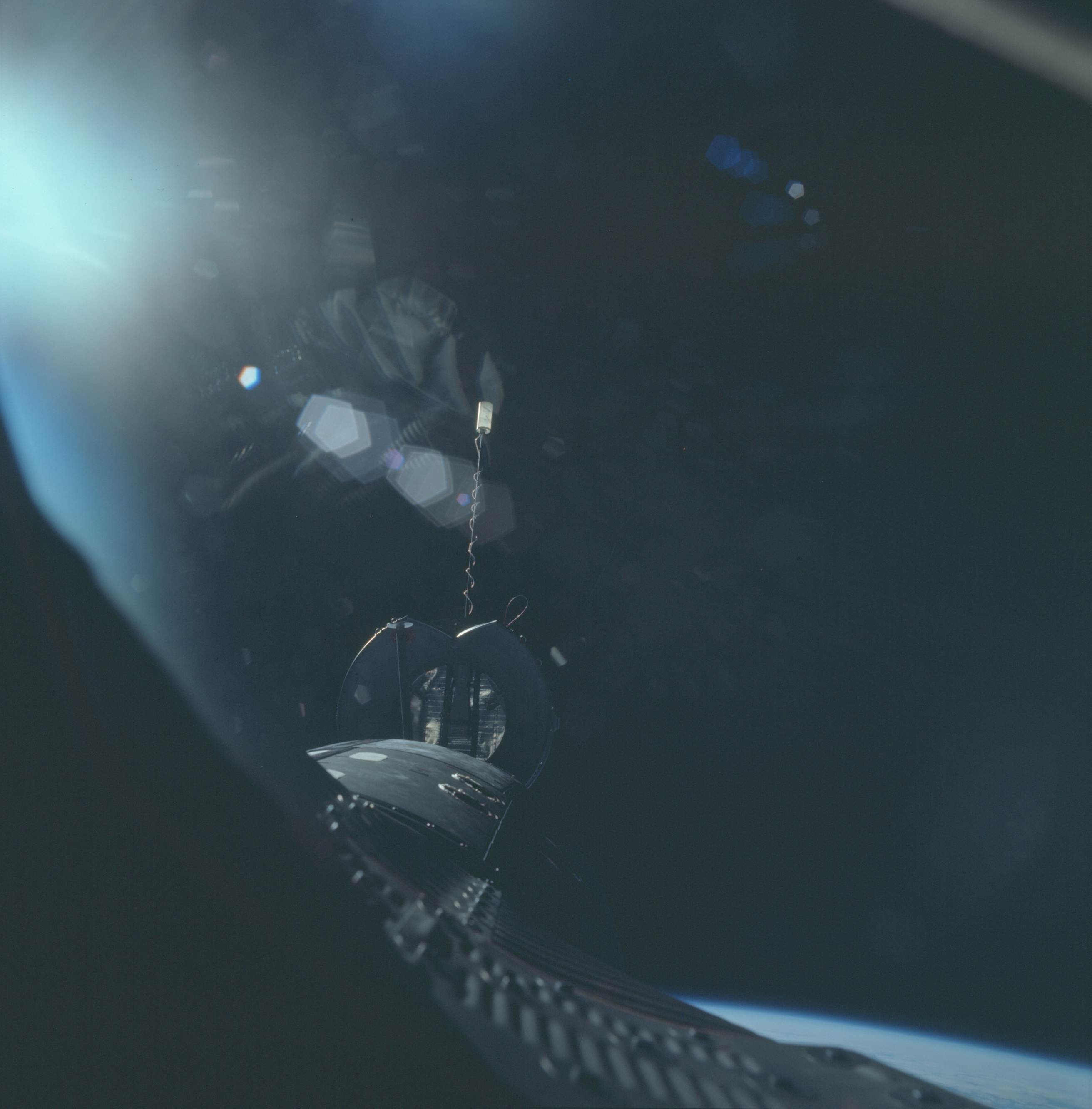
The Gemini 12 spacecraft and the Agena, photographed at 15 feet (4.6 m) apart during docking.

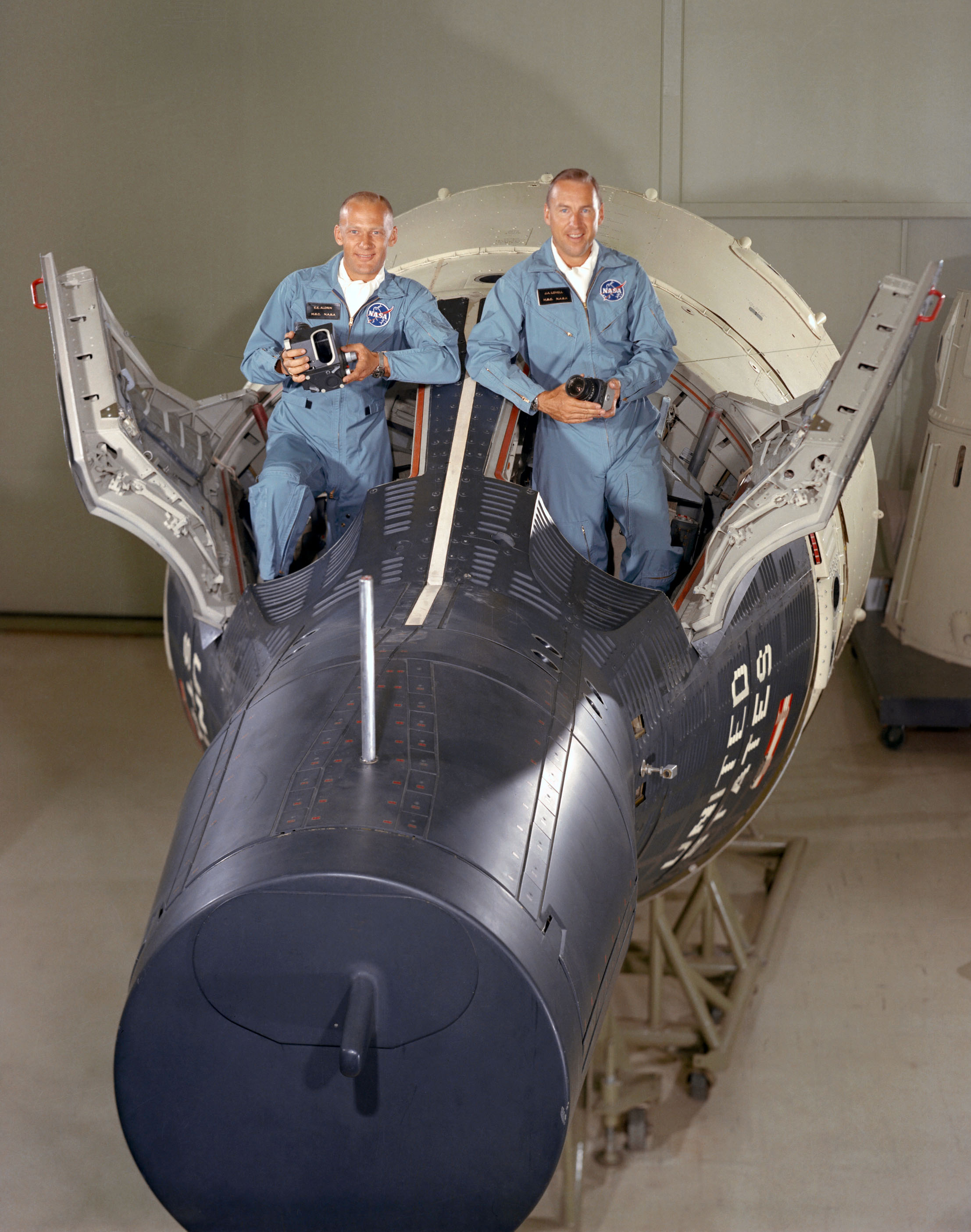
Gemini 12 prime crew: Astronauts James A. Lovell Jr. (right), command pilot, and Edwin E. Aldrin Jr., pilot.

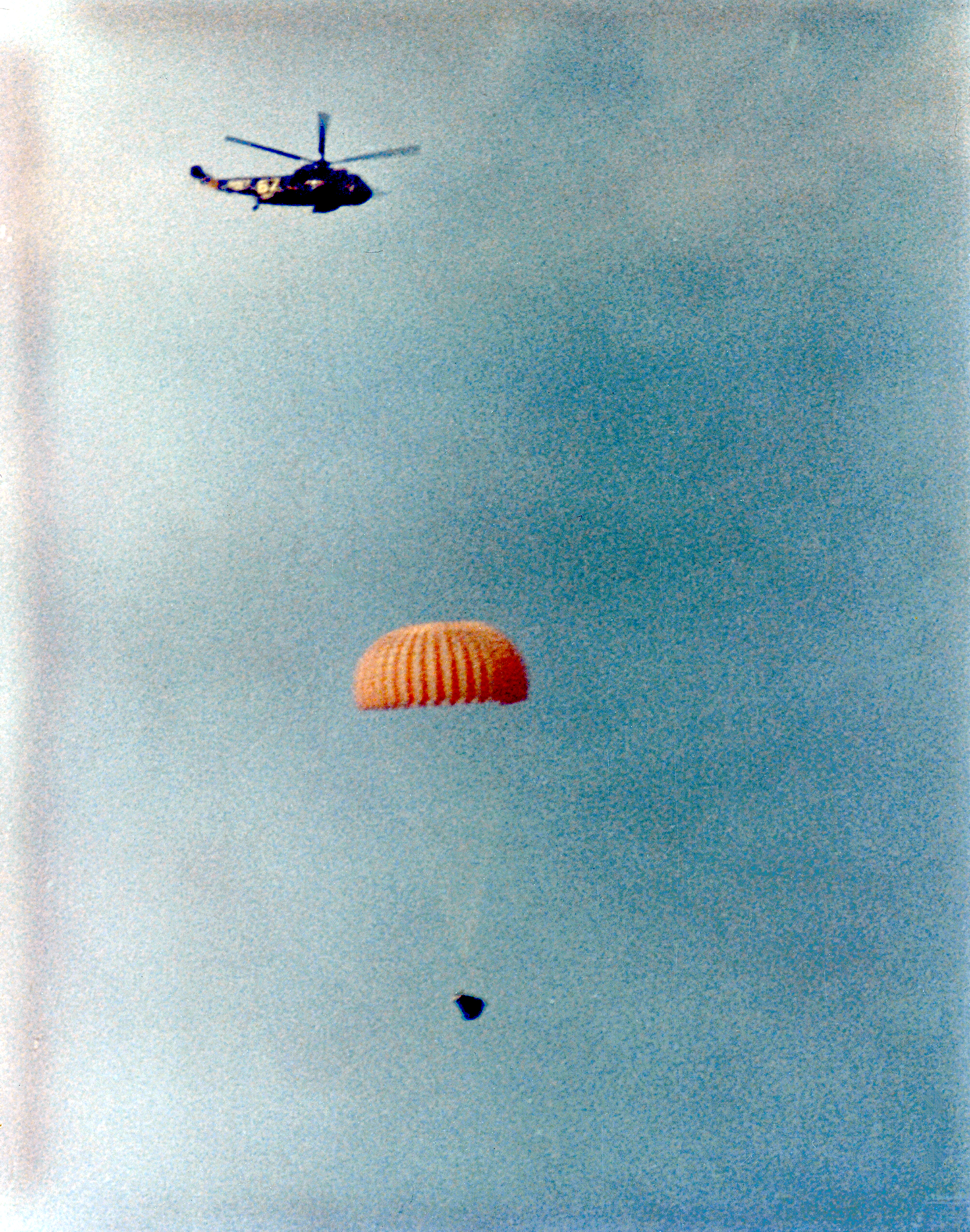
Parachuted descend of Gemini 12.

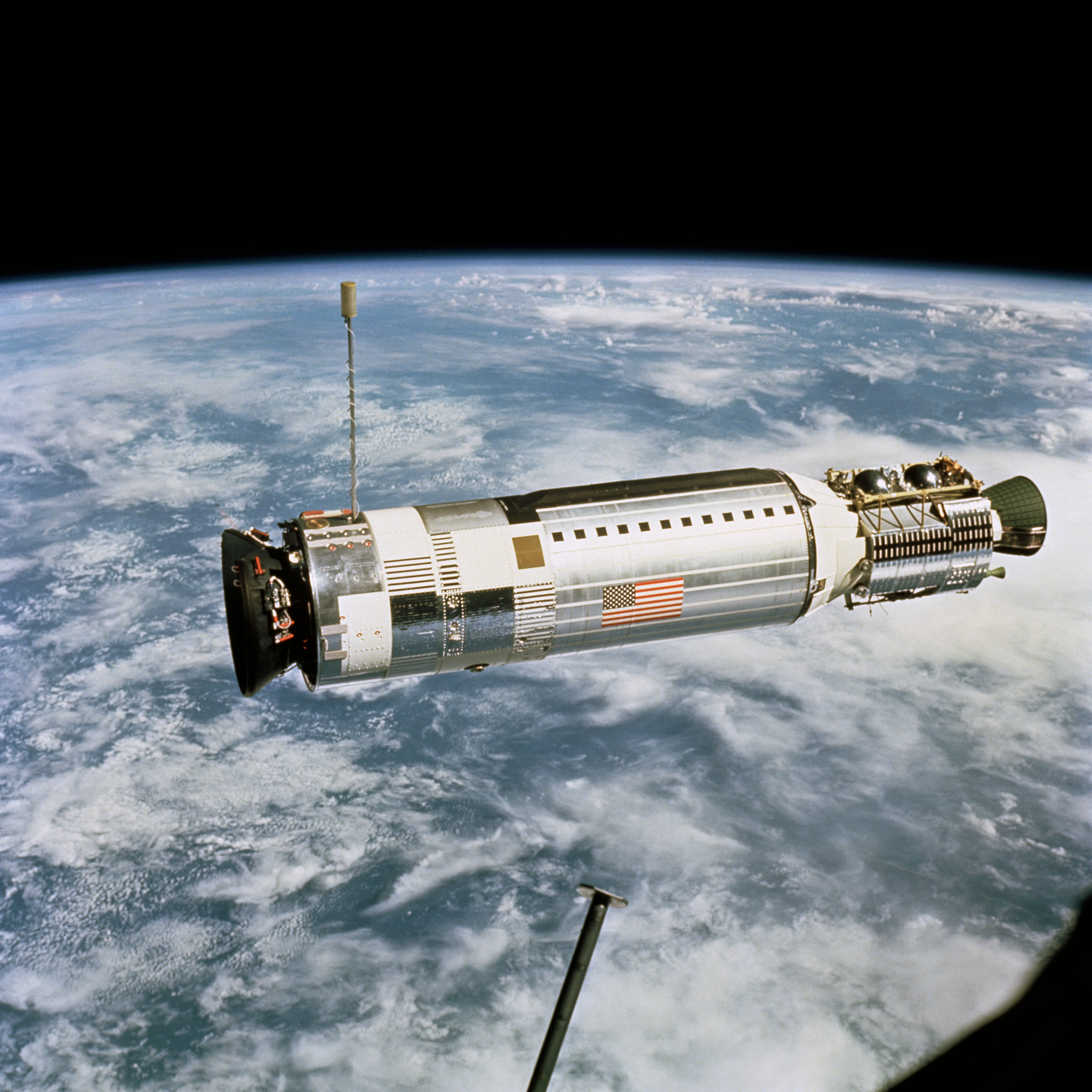
Agena Vehicle as seen from Gemini 12 during docking mission.

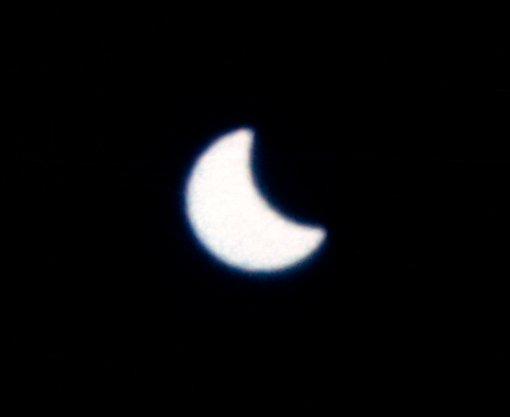
Solar eclipse photograph taken by the Gemini 12 crew (November 12).

== Spacecraft location ==
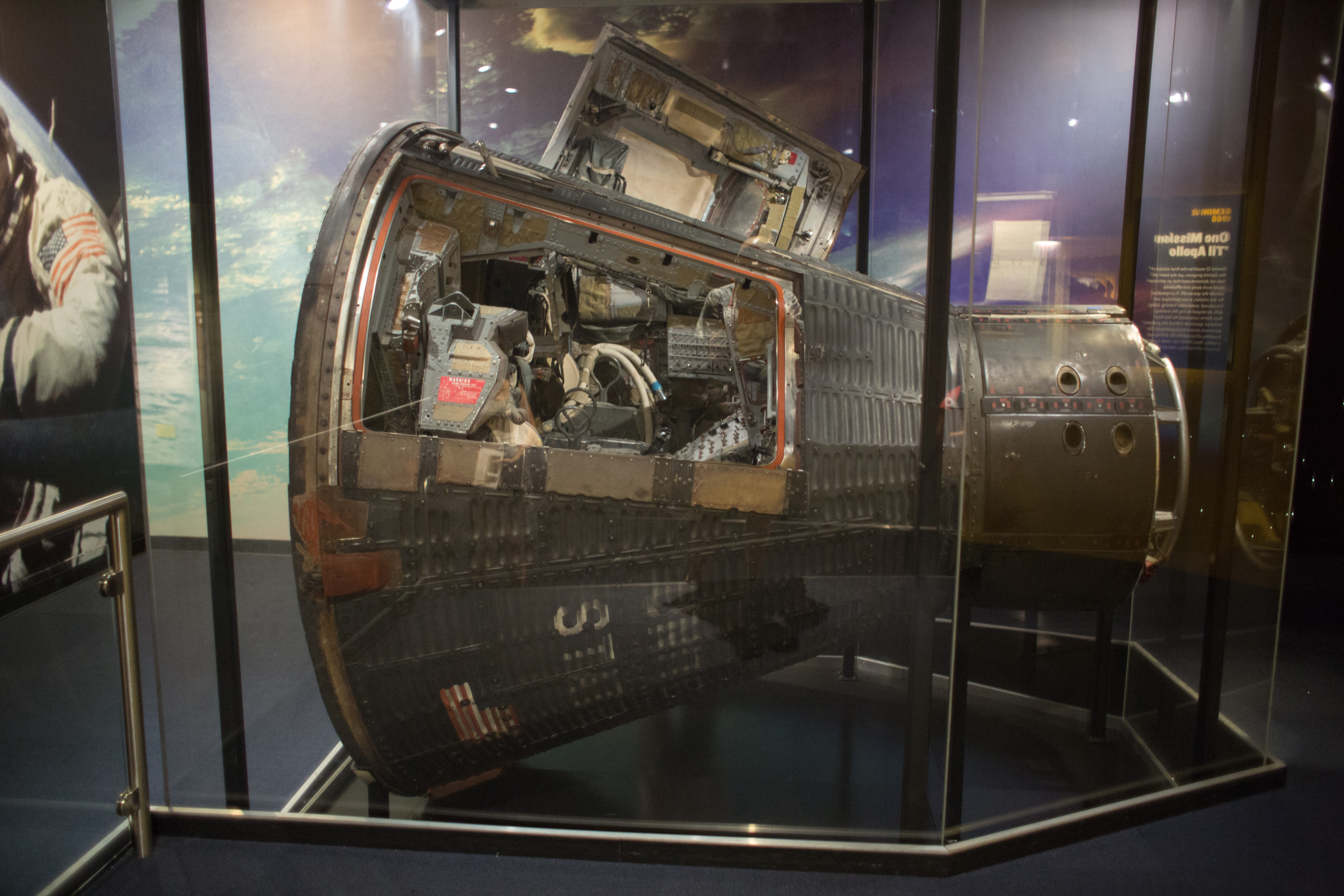
The Gemini 12 space capsule at Chicago's Adler Planetarium

After several years at the Museum of Transport and Technology, in Auckland, New Zealand, the spacecraft was returned to the United States. It is now on display at the Adler Planetarium, Chicago, Illinois. Lovell and Aldrin were reunited with the spacecraft on November 9, 2006 during the opening for Adler's "Shoot for the Moon" exhibit, almost 40 years after the mission launched.

== See also ==
- Agena target vehicle
- Extravehicular activity
- Lists of spacewalks and moonwalks
- Splashdown
- Solar eclipse of November 12, 1966
- Space suit
