= Spiral Galaxy (sculpture) =

Sculpture by John David Mooney

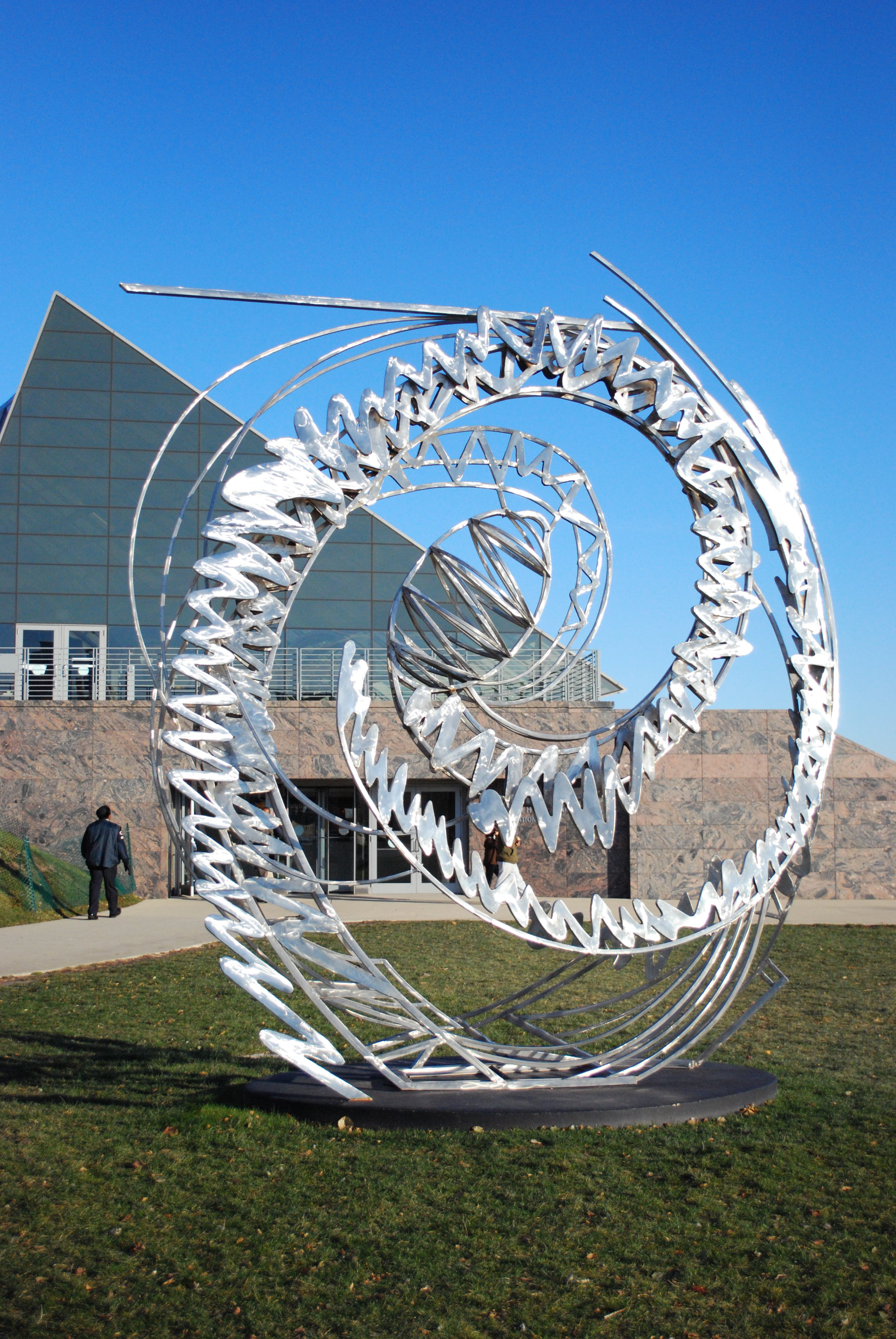
- The sculpture in 2008
- Artist: John David Mooney
- Year: 1998
- Location: Chicago, Illinois, United States
- 41°51′57.66″N 87°36′25.82″W

Spiral Galaxy is an outdoor stainless steel sculpture by John David Mooney, installed outside the Adler Planetarium on Chicago's Northerly Island, in the U.S. state of Illinois.

== Description and history ==
The work was commissioned by the Vatican Observatory in 1994 to commemorate the Inspiration of Astronomical Phenomena conference, and inspired by Galileo's drawings and early photographs of the closest galaxies to Earth. The 14-foot (4.3 m) sculpture was installed at Navy Pier in 1998, then temporarily exhibited in Sarasota, Florida. Spiral Galaxy was moved to its current location in 2005, to commemorate the planetarium's 75th anniversary.

== See also ==
- 1998 in art
- List of public art in Chicago
