= Man Enters the Cosmos =

Cast bronze sculpture by Henry Moore

Coordinates: 41.866259°N 87.607374°W

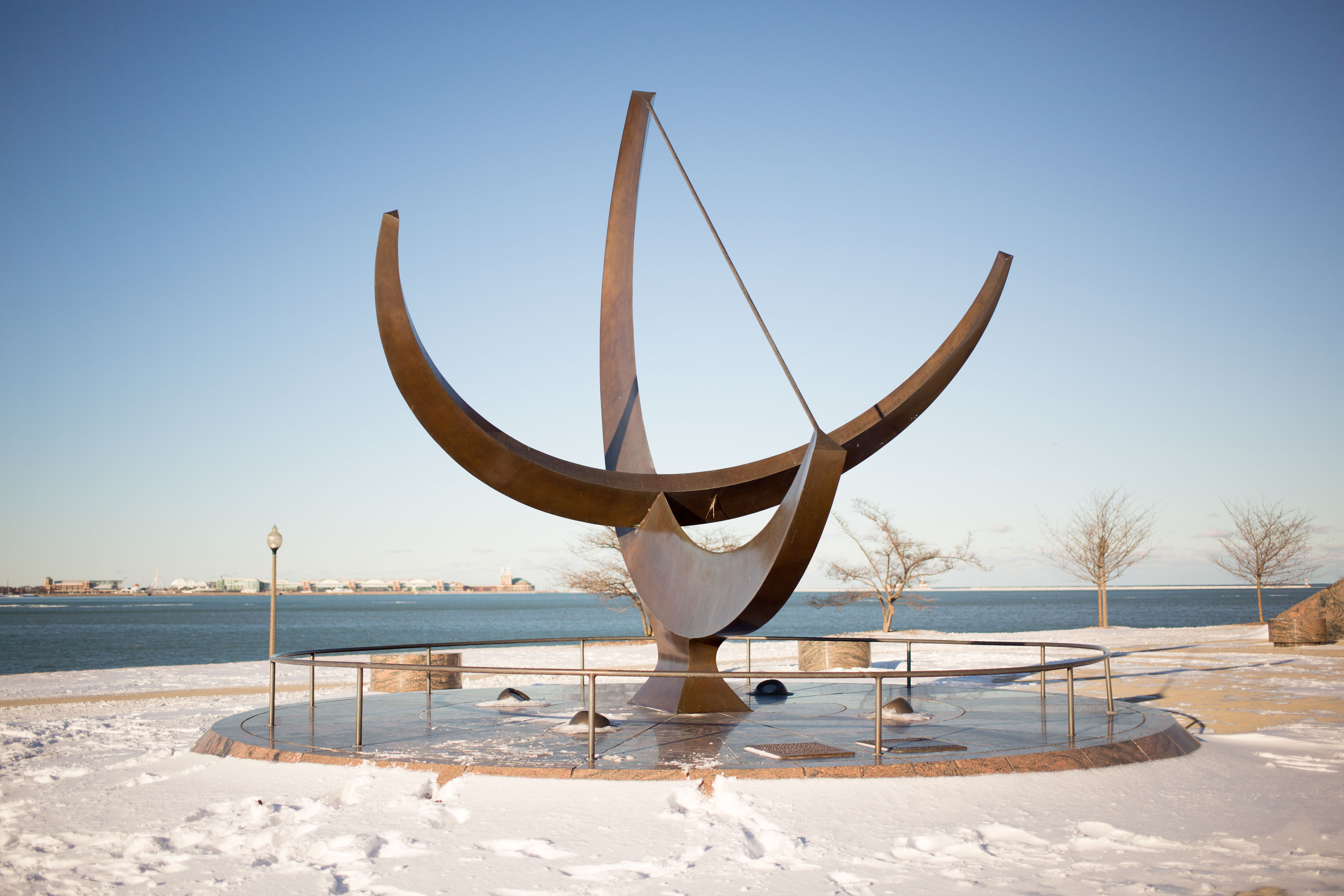
- Sundial with Lake Michigan in the background
- Interactive fullscreen map
- Artist: Henry Moore
- Year: 1980
- Catalogue: LH 528
- Type: Bronze
- Dimensions: 396 cm (156 in)
- Location: Adler Planetarium (outdoor), Chicago, Illinois

Man Enters the Cosmos is a cast bronze sculpture by Henry Moore located on the Lake Michigan lakefront outside the Adler Planetarium in the Museum Campus area of downtown Chicago, Illinois.

The sculpture is a functional bowstring equatorial sundial created in 1980 measuring approximately 13 feet (4.0 m). The sundial was formerly located slightly further south at the steps of the main entry plaza to the Planetarium, but it now sits directly on the lakefront. The work is a later copy of a composition first created in the 1960s for the offices of The Times newspaper at Printing House Square in London, and according to the Henry Moore Foundation is titled Sundial 1965–66.

== Details ==
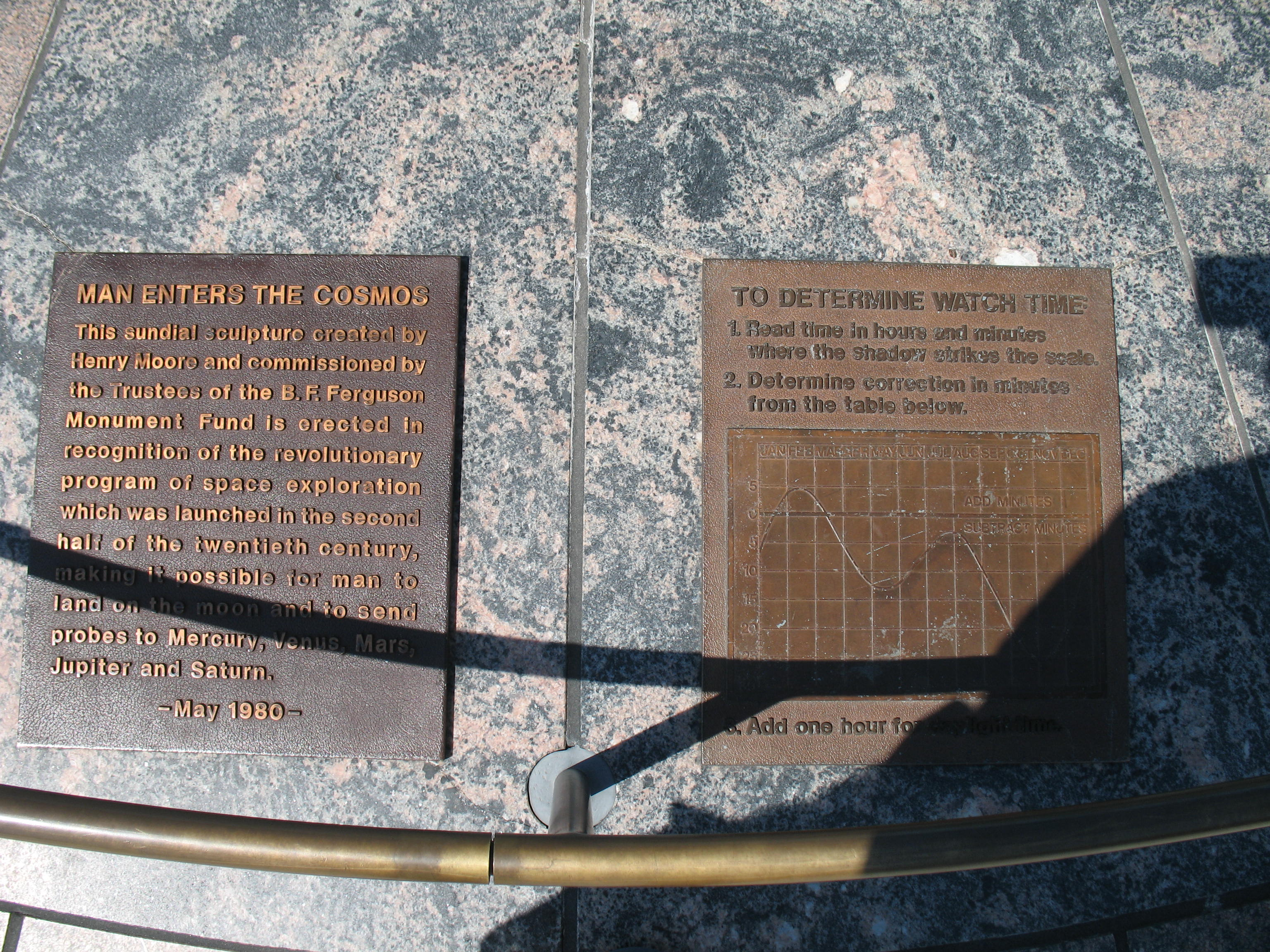
Plaques explaining the sculpture's significance and usage

The Adler Planetarium, in the Museum Campus area of downtown Chicago, Illinois, is both a National Historic Landmark and listed on the National Register of Historic Places, and is located in the Near South Side community area of Chicago.

The sundial has two plaques on its base. The one on the left is a commemorative one discussing the benefactor and purpose of the sculpture. The benefactor of the sculpture was the B.F. Ferguson Monument fund, which has commissioned several works of art throughout Chicago. Many of the Ferguson fund's commissioned works, such as the Fountain of the Great Lakes, are housed in and on the grounds of the Art Institute of Chicago or elsewhere in Grant Park. The purpose of the commission was to recognize the space exploration program. The plaque on the right is an equation of time table to correct for the time differences caused by the axial tilt of the Earth as well as its orbital eccentricity. As the plaque indicates with an additional correction, the equation of time table does not correct for daylight saving time.

Like most of Moore's work completed after 1954, this was a modeled sculpture instead of a direct carving. The sculpture is composed of two bronze semicircles, one set inside and at right angles to the other and a slim bronze rod that extends from one end of the outer semicircle to the other that serves as the gnomon (indicator). The bowstring equatorial sundial derives its name from the appearance of the shadow-casting gnomon, which resembles a bow string. The shadow of the rod projects onto the inner semicircle, which serves as the dial face (or dial plate), to mark the time of day when there is sufficient sunlight to produce shadows.

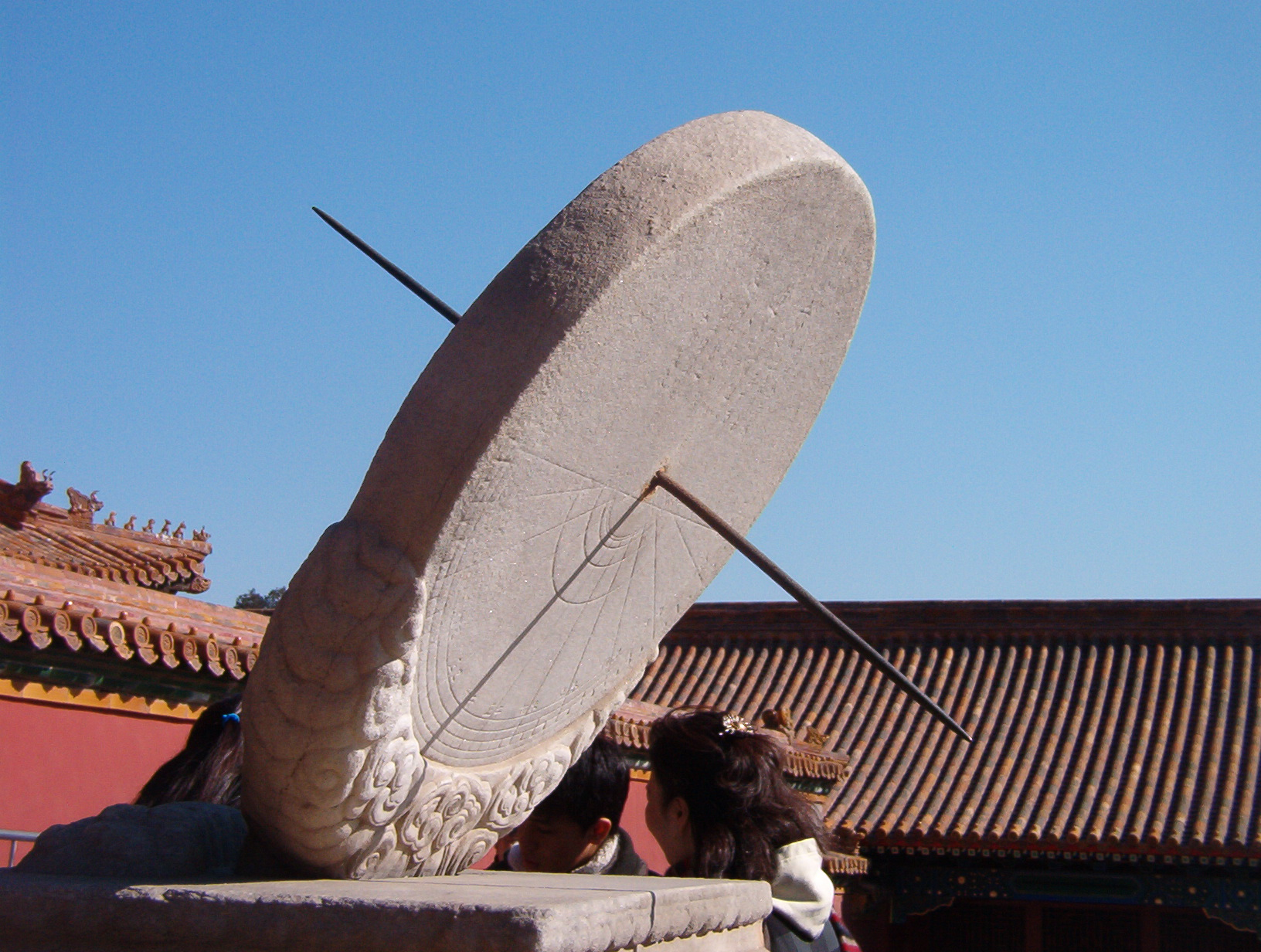
A standard unmodified equatorial sundial

Over the course of the year different sections of the rod serve as the style, which is the part of the gnomon that indicates the time by casting its shadow on the dial face. At the summer solstice, when the Sun is highest (farthest above the equatorial plane), the style is closest to the top of the rod, and at the winter solstice, when the Sun is lowest, it is closest to the bottom. At the equinoxes, when the Sun is on the equatorial plane, the style is exactly in the center of the length of the rod. The style of the equatorial sundial is parallel to the Earth's axis of rotation.

This type of sundial is known as an equatorial sundial because the plane of the dial face is parallel to the Earth's equatorial plane. Two primary examples of modified equatorial sundials are bowstring equatorial and armillary dials. Both of these modified equatorial sundials can be read year-round on the same surface, regardless of whether the Sun is above or below the equatorial plane whereas a standard equatorial sundial changes sides with each equinox and is virtually unreadable near the equinoxes when the Sun is located on the equatorial plane.

Between 1997 and 1999, The Adler Planetarium added a sky pavilion to the original 1930 architecture. When it did so, the roads were moved and the sundial was moved to its current location. The move was performed by contractors of the Adler Planetarium in two phases. First, the sculpture was removed and placed in storage to make way for the current roadway. It was later moved to its current position after the new roadway was built and the old roadway was replaced with a walkway. Now, a u-turn in Solidarity Drive runs through the original location of the sundial, and the sundial is located on the walkway that replaced the previous roadway that went around the planetarium. The new location and the u-turn can be seen on a Museum Campus map. This construction was contemporaneous with the $100 million project that reconfigured of traffic around the Museum Campus and caused Lake Shore Drive to be moved during the mid-1990s.

== Moore in Chicago ==
Moore took pride in viewing his sculptures in their open-air environments. He once said he would prefer to see his sculptures in any open landscape than in even the most beautiful buildings he knew. Including this sculpture, Moore has a total of four public sculptures that are listed in the Smithsonian Institution's Research Information System (SIRIS) on display outdoors, in Chicago. All of them are bronze. His Nuclear Energy is situated on the campus of the University of Chicago at the site of the first self-sustaining nuclear reaction, which is listed in the National Register of Historic Places. The site is also listed as a National Historic Landmark, and Chicago Landmark. Other Chicago works include Large Interior Form, which is located in the north garden at the Art Institute of Chicago, and Reclining Figure, which is on loan to the University of Chicago and which is located in the Cochrane-Woods Art Center courtyard. The Henry Moore Foundation lists several other indoor Chicago works at locations such as the Art Institute of Chicago and The Smart Museum.

== See also ==
- List of sculptures by Henry Moore
- List of public art in Chicago
