= Max Adler (businessman) =

American businessman (1866–1952)

Max Adler (May 12, 1866 – November 4, 1952) was an American businessman, musician and philanthropist. Adler was born in Elgin, Illinois, to a family of Jewish German origins that emigrated to America in about 1850. He was raised in Elgin and graduated from Elgin High School. As an adult, he was a concert violinist in Chicago before he gave up music to become a vice president at Sears Roebuck & Co. after marrying into the family that controlled the company. His wife was Sophie Rosenwald, the sister of Julius Rosenwald, who founded Chicago's Museum of Science and Industry. He retired in 1928 to become a philanthropist and was key to the creation of the first planetarium in the Western Hemisphere, the Adler Planetarium in Chicago, which bears his name.

In 1914, he had a 12,000 square foot mansion built as his house.
