= Adler Planetarium =

Astronomical museum in Chicago, Illinois

- The Adler Planetarium
- U.S. National Register of Historic Places
- U.S. National Historic Landmark
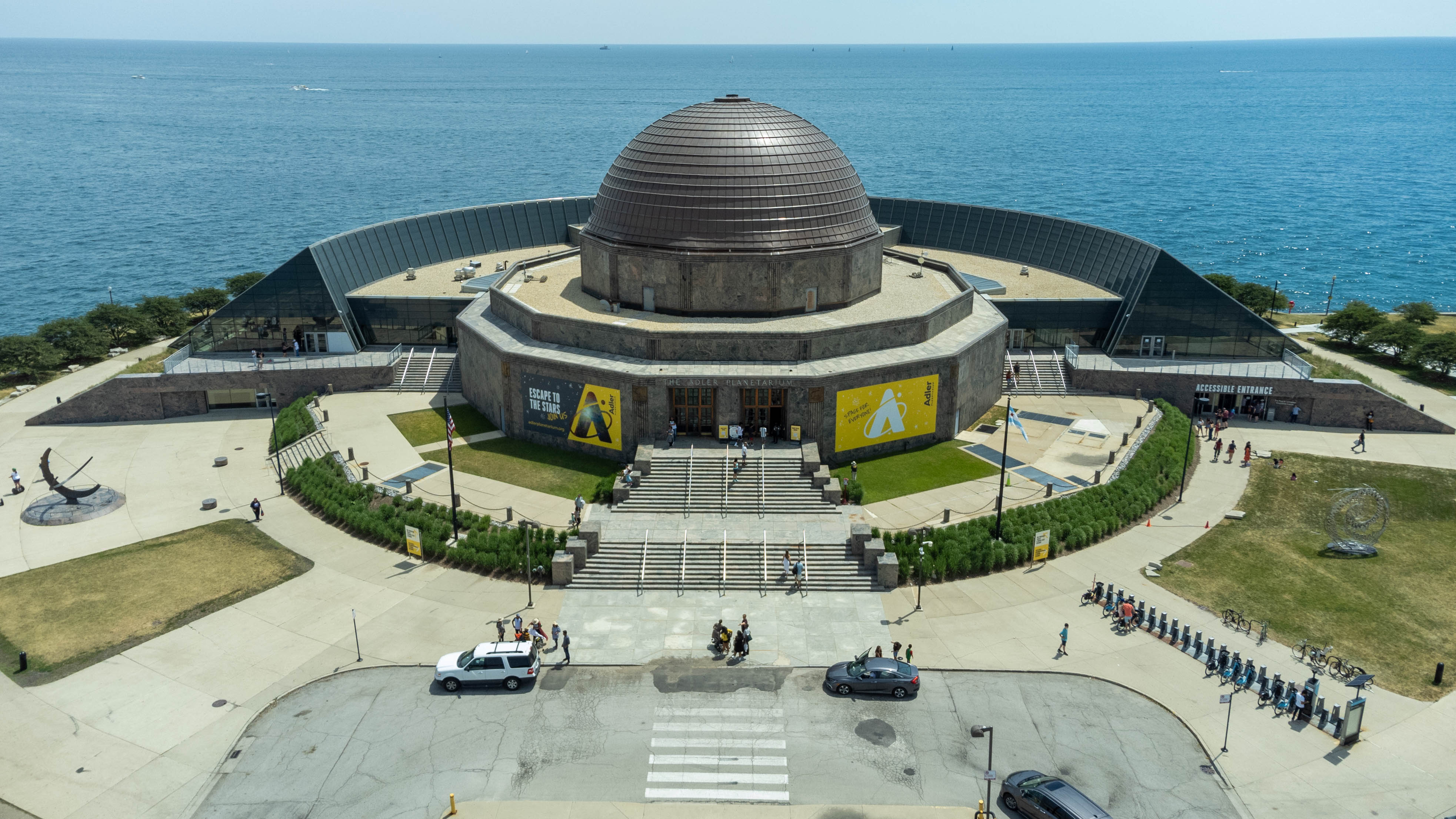
- The planetarium in 2022

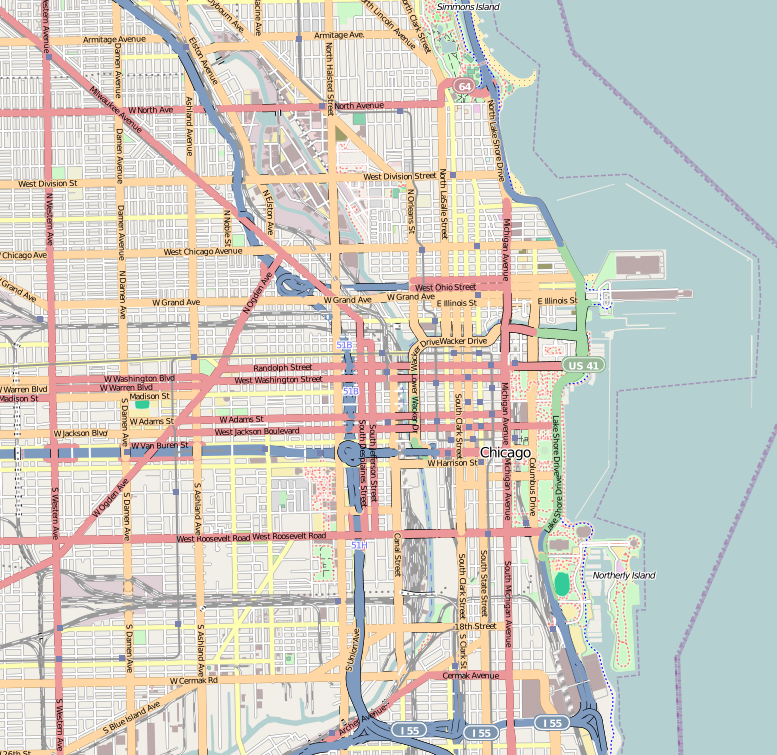
- Location within Central Chicago
- Location: 1300 S. Lake Shore Drive; Chicago, Illinois, United States
- Coordinates: 41°51′59″N 87°36′24″W
- Built: 1930
- Architect: Ernest Grunsfeld Jr.
- Architectural style: Art Deco
- NRHP reference No.: 87000819

Significant dates
- Added to NRHP: February 27, 1987
- Designated NHL: February 27, 1987

The Adler Planetarium is a municipal public museum for astronomy in Chicago, Illinois, United States. It is operated by the Chicago Park District, a municipal government agency of the City of Chicago. It is the first planetarium in the United States.

It was founded in 1930 by local businessman Max Adler. Located on the northeastern tip of Northerly Island on Lake Michigan, the Adler Planetarium was the first planetarium in the United States. It is part of Chicago's Museum Campus, which includes the Shedd Aquarium and the Field Museum of Natural History. The Planetarium's mission is to inspire exploration and understanding of the universe.

The Adler Planetarium opened to the public on May 12, 1930. Its architect, Ernest A. Grunsfeld Jr., was awarded the gold medal of the Chicago chapter of the American Institute of Architects in 1931 for its design. In 1987, it was declared a National Historic Landmark.

The Adler has three theaters, space science exhibitions, including the Gemini 12 space capsule, and a collection of antique scientific instruments and print materials. In addition, the Adler Planetarium hosts the Doane Observatory, a research-active public observatory.

The planetarium is surrounded by sculptures including: Man Enters the Cosmos by Henry Moore (1980); Spiral Galaxy by John David Mooney (1998); and America's Courtyard by Ary Perez and Denise Milan.

== History ==
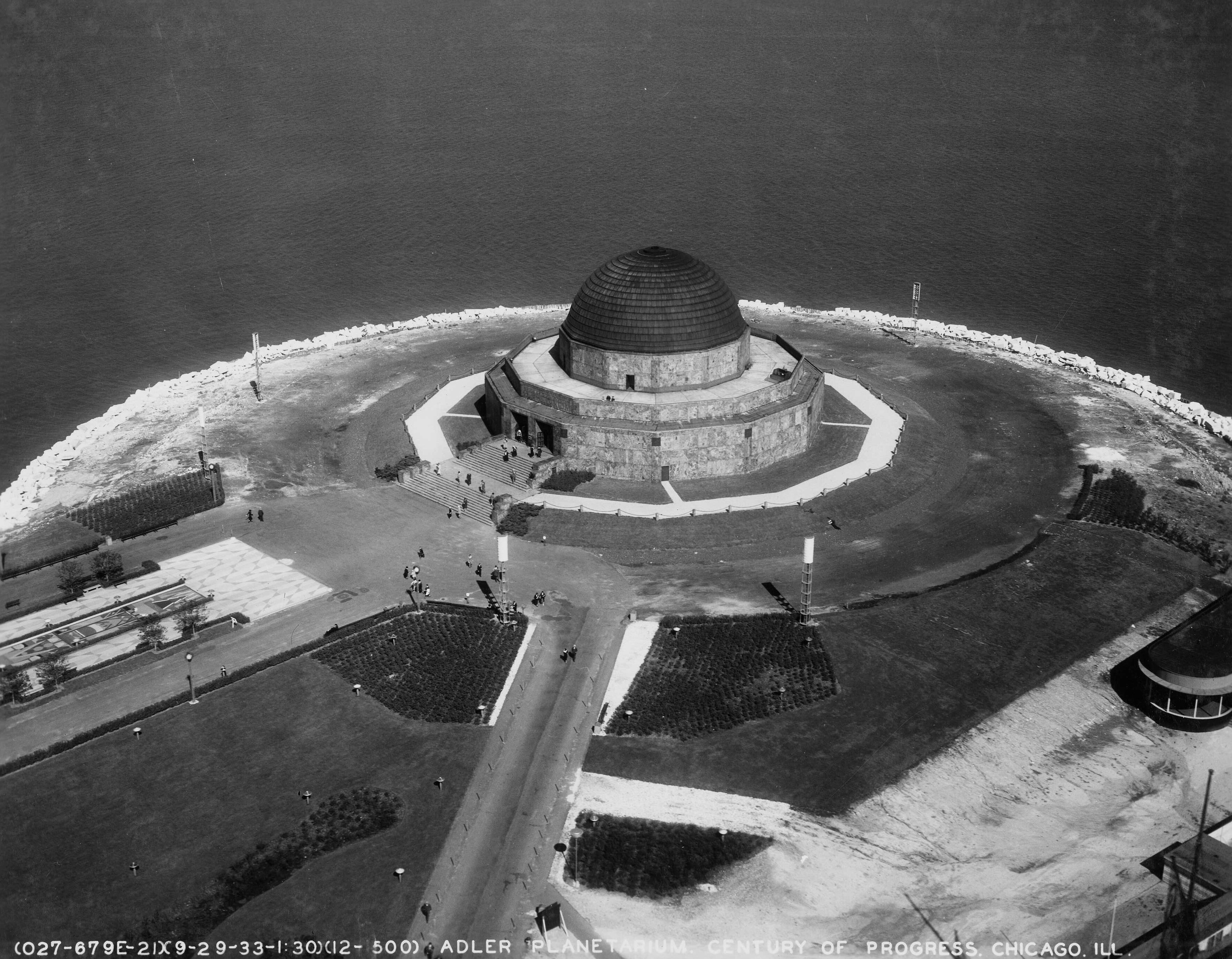
Adler Planetarium, 1930s

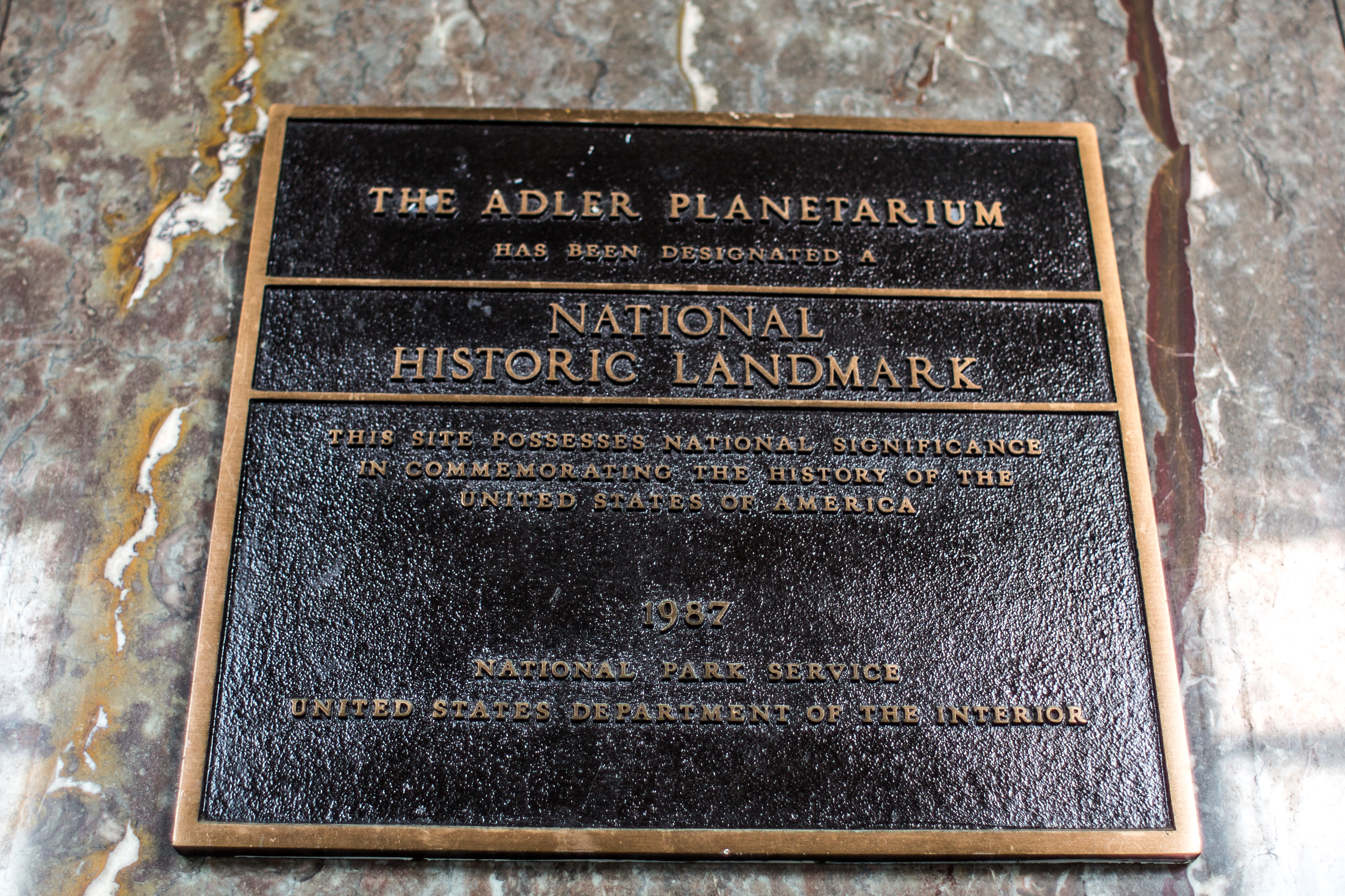
Adler Planetarium landmark marker

=== Establishment ===
In 1913, Oskar von Miller of the Deutsches Museum commissioned Carl Zeiss Works to design a mechanism that projects an image of celestial bodies onto a dome. This was achieved by Walther Bauersfeld and the invention became known as a planetarium when it debuted in 1923. Its popularity spread, and by 1929, there were fifteen planetariums in Germany, two in Italy, one in Russia, and one in Austria. Max Adler, a former executive with Sears, Roebuck & Co. in Chicago, Illinois, had recently retired to focus on philanthropic endeavors, primarily on behalf of musical and Jewish communities. However, after listening to a friend describe a Munich planetarium, Adler decided that a planetarium would fit in well within the emerging Museum Campus in Chicago. Adler visited the Munich planetarium with his cousin, architect Ernest Grunsfeld Jr., whom Adler commissioned to design the Chicago structure. He also learned about a sale of astronomical instruments and antiques by W. M. Mensing in Amsterdam, which he purchased the following year. The Mensing Collection became the focus of the Astronomical Museum. Adler offered $500,000 in 1928 for the construction of the first planetarium in the Western Hemisphere.

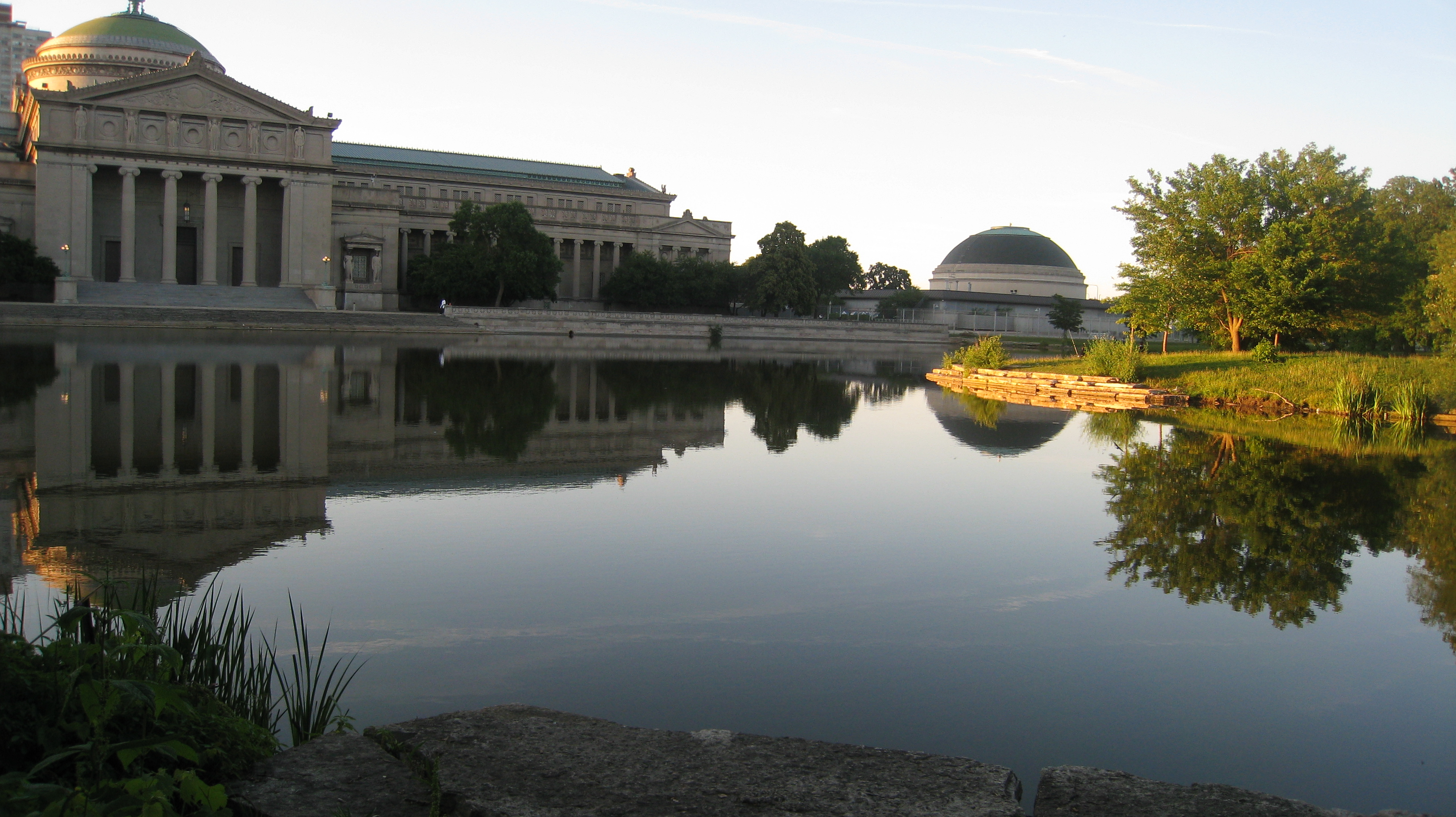
The Adler Planetarium was originally planned as a part of the Museum of Science and Industry, pictured here.

The planetarium was originally considered as a part of the Museum of Science and Industry, an endeavor led by Adler's brother-in-law Julius Rosenwald. Rosenwald was determined to convert the former Palace of Fine Arts of the 1893 World's Columbian Exposition into a museum but was struggling to manage the many required renovations.

The delays caused Adler to look elsewhere for a location. The South Park Commissioners, the precursor to the Chicago Park District, had just completed Northerly Island, the first of five intended (but otherwise never executed) recreational islands that were to be consistent with Daniel Burnham's 1909 Plan of Chicago. The Adler Planetarium and Astronomical Museum opened on Adler's birthday, May 12, 1930. The Chicago chapter of the American Institute of Architects awarded Grunsfield a gold medal for his design. The planetarium hosted the 44th meeting of the American Astronomical Society later that year.

=== Timeline ===
1923 – Walther Bauersfeld, scientific director of the firm of Carl Zeiss in Jena, Germany, designs an optical projection device that effectively creates the illusion of a night sky. With this innovation, the modern planetarium is born.

1928 – Max Adler and architect Ernest Grunsfeld travel to Germany. Adler is so impressed by the modern planetarium that he donates funds to construct the first planetarium in the Western Hemisphere.

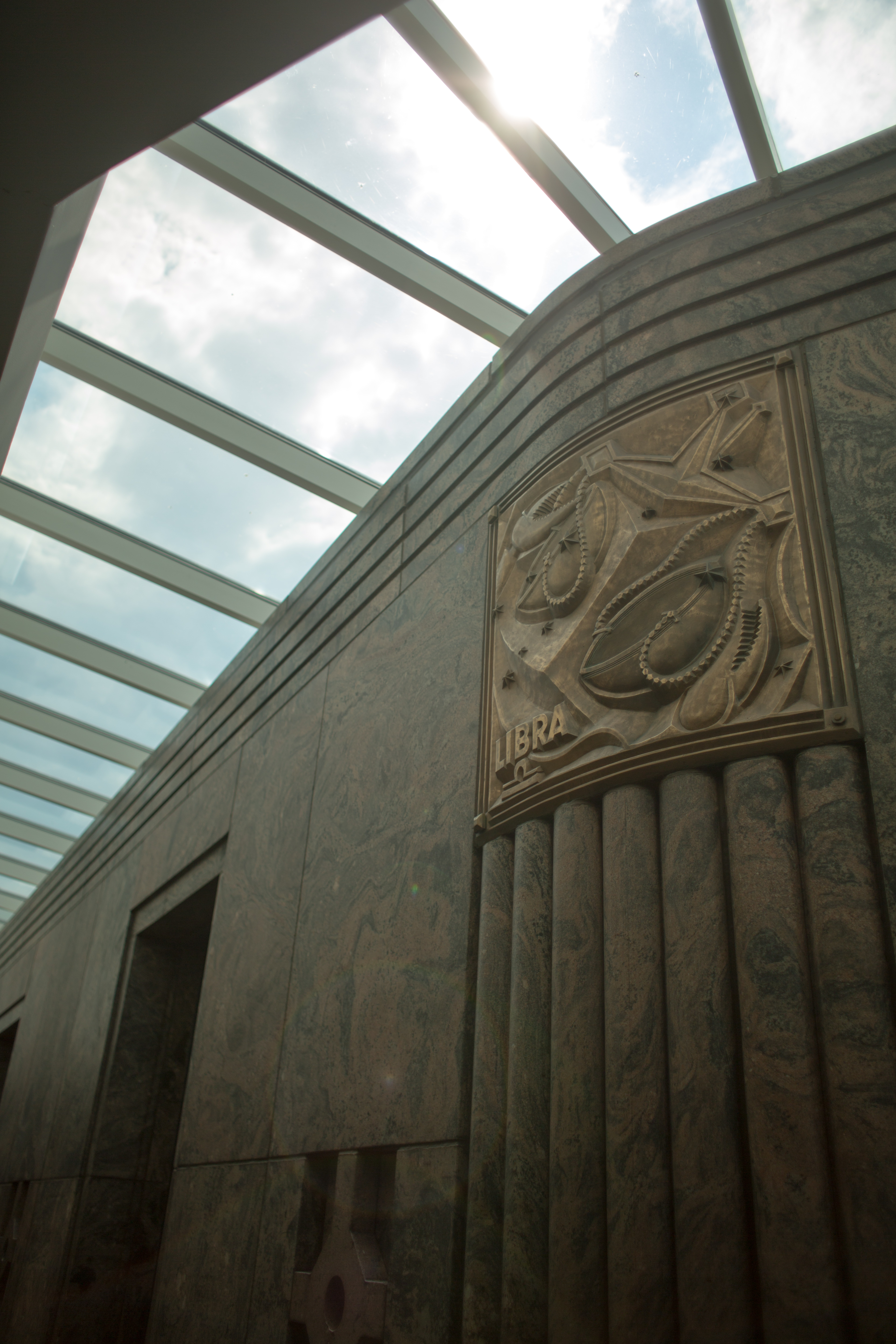
Adler Planetarium original building exterior meets the new building renovation

1930 – Max Adler purchases the collection of A. W. Mensing at an auction in Amsterdam. This collection of antique scientific instruments provided the foundation for Adler's collection. The Adler Planetarium opened to the public on Max Adler's birthday, May 12. Phillip Fox, Ph.D., a professor of astronomy at Northwestern University, is appointed the Planetarium's first director.

1933 – The Century of Progress Exposition takes place on what is now the Museum Campus.

1941 – Philip Fox is deployed to the Army; Assistant Director Maude Bennot is appointed acting director of the Planetarium during his absence.

1952 – Max Adler dies.

1967 – The board of trustees is created to share in the responsibilities and management of the Adler Planetarium with the commissioners of the Chicago Park District. The Adler Planetarium refurbishes the building and replaces the original Zeiss projector with a new Mark VI Zeiss unit.

1973 – A new underground expansion opens to the public on May 12, 1973, Adler Planetarium's 43rd birthday.

1976 – The Board of Trustees assumes full management responsibility for the planetarium but continues to receive support from the Chicago Park District.

1977 – The Doane Observatory opens.

1991 – The museum unveils the results of the $6.5 million renovation project. After 23 years of leadership, Dr. Joseph M. Chamberlain retires.

1999 – The 60,000 square foot Sky Pavilion, designed by Lohan Associates of Chicago, opens to the public. The addition features four new exhibition galleries, including the historic Atwood Sphere and the Definiti (formerly StarRider) Theater.

2005 – Retired NASA Astronaut James A. Lovell Jr. serves as chairman of Adler's 75th-anniversary celebration.

2007 – The Adler unveils its new Space Visualization Laboratory, bringing the latest images of space science to the public.

2010 – The Adler begins transformation of the historic Sky Theater. The renamed Grainger Sky Theater opened in May 2011. At the time, the Grainger was the most technologically advanced dome theater in the world. Thomas Roszak Architecture designed the Clark Family Welcome Gallery using an LED-lit fabric and aluminum structure that includes educational interactive material projected on the fabric walls.

2012 – Paul H. Knappenberger Jr. Ph.D., announces his retirement after 21 years of service.

2013 – The Board of Trustees elects astrophysicist and academic leader Michelle B. Larson, Ph.D., as president and CEO. Dr. Larson becomes the Adler's ninth leader and the first female president.

2015 – Major upgrade of the Doane Observatory completed.

2025 – The Adler Planetarium appoints Elizabeth Babcock as President and Chief Executive Officer.

== Research ==
The Adler Planetarium's Astronomy department and Webster Institute for the History of Astronomy conduct and publish research for both the scientific community as well as the general public.

Adler astronomers possess expertise in many areas of astronomy as well as other closely related science fields. Their studies include planetary geology, star formation, gamma-rays, and telescope observing.

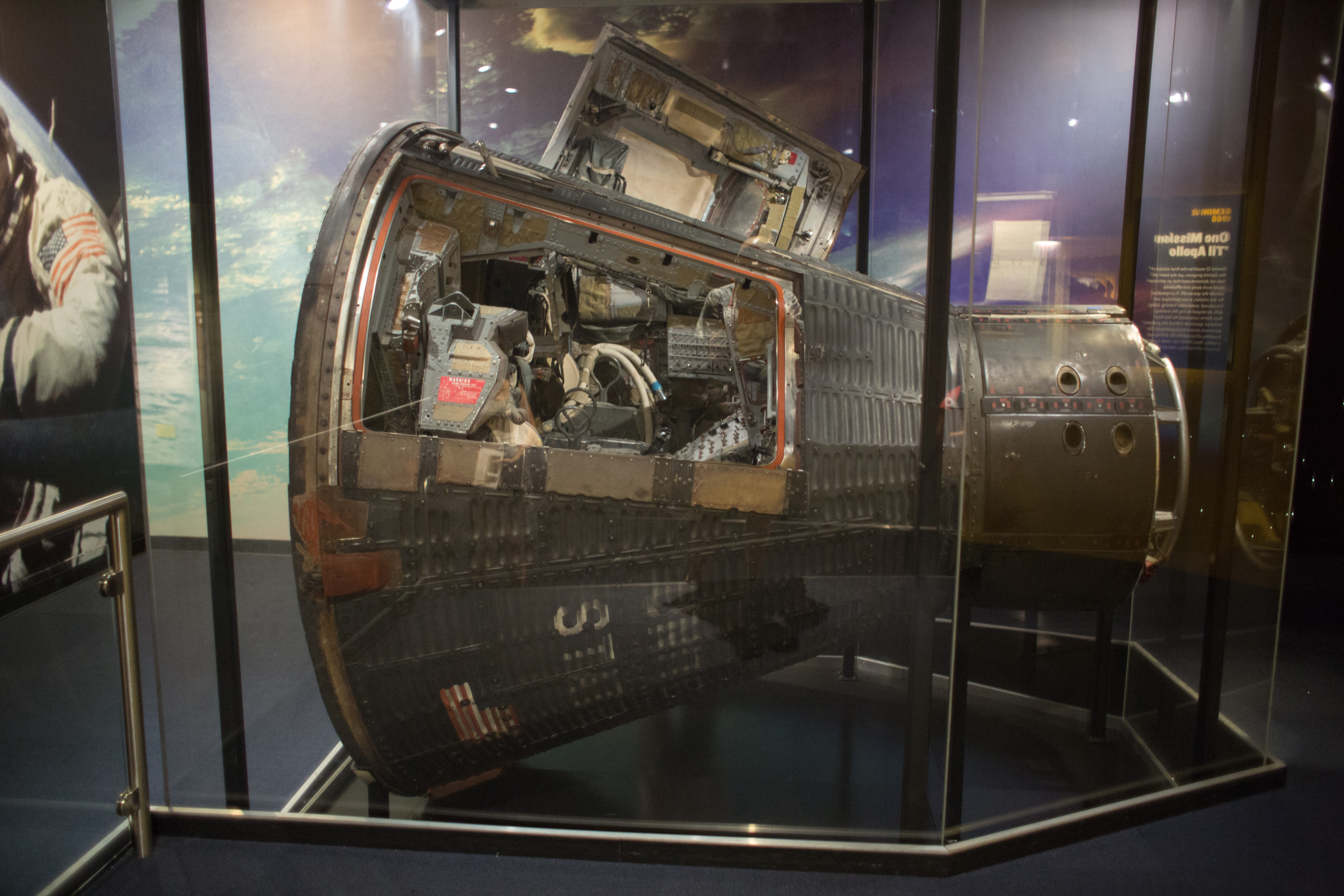
Gemini 12, the 1966 space capsule from the 10th and final mission of NASA's Project Gemini, flown by Jim Lovell and Buzz Aldrin

Originally founded as the Webster Institute for the History of Astronomy, the Collections department cares for, studies, and interprets the planetarium collections. Since the opening of the Adler, the collection has grown to approximately 8,000 objects, books, works on paper, archival collections, paintings, and photographs. The Adler hosts archives from Derek J. de Solla Price, Michael J. Crowe, and Jim Lovell, as well as the largest collection of historic scientific instruments in the Western Hemisphere.

The Space Visualization Laboratory (SVL) was inaugurated in 2007 to virtually explore the Universe.

The Adler Citizen Science Department is also the U.S. headquarters of The Zooniverse, a citizen science platform and a global collaboration across several institutions that design and build citizen science projects. As of early 2014, the Zooniverse has engaged more than 1.1 million online volunteers as active scientists by discovering planets, mapping the surface of Mars, and detecting solar flares.

Far Horizons is the Adler's high-altitude balloon program. Participants design, build, and launch experiments flown to heights above 100,000 feet (30,000 m) on high-altitude balloons. The program offers real-world opportunities for students and the community to participate in science, mathematics, physics, and engineering challenges.

Opened in 1977, the Doane Observatory is the largest aperture telescope available to the public in the Chicago area. With its 24-inch (610 mm; 61 cm) diameter mirror, the Doane can gather over 7,000 times more light than an unaided human eye, allowing guests to see celestial objects like the Moon, planets, stars, and galaxies that are trillions of kilometers, if not many light years, away. The original telescope, a 16-inch (410 mm; 41 cm) Cassegrain reflecting telescope built by the Adler optical and machine shop staff, was retired in 1987 and replaced with the current telescope.

In 2013, the Adler Planetarium undertook the first major renovation of the Doane Observatory. Completed in 2015, renovations included the addition of an indoor classroom, a restroom, accessible entry ramps, and telescope and technology upgrades.

The Adler Planetarium is a member institution of the Large Synoptic Survey Telescope project.

== Theaters ==
The Adler Planetarium features two domed theaters, and one standard theater. The largest, the Grainger Sky Theater, has a dome that measures 21 metres (69 ft; 830 in) in diameter. In 2008, when funding for an advanced projection system was being debated in Congress, politician John McCain characterized the upgrade as a new "overhead projector".

== Programs ==
'Adler After Dark', the Adler Planetarium's 21+ evening event, was voted "Best After Hours Event" of 2013 by the Chicago Reader and "Best Date Night" by Chicago Parent. Guests at Adler After Dark have open museum access, themed programs, sky shows and views of the Chicago skyline. 'Astro Overnights' give families a chance to spend a night under the stars at the Adler. Guests have open museum access, a sky show and educational programming. The Astronomy Department at the Adler presents current topics in astronomy through a quarterly lecture series.

The Adler hosts quarterly 'Hack Days', intended to encourage software developers, designers, scientists, engineers, artists and people who just like to create and build, to work together to solve problems. Participants at the Adler's summer camps build rockets, launch high-altitude balloons, and explore the edge of space. The Adler's hands-on summer camps are designed for children ages 5–14.

== See also ==
- List of museums and cultural institutions in Chicago
- List of planetariums
- Museum Campus
- Spiral Galaxy (sculpture)
- List of astronomical observatories
