= Berwyn =

Berwyn originally referred to the Berwyn range of mountains in northeast Wales:

Berwyn may also refer to:

== Places ==
=== United States ===
- Berwyn, Illinois, a city
- Berwyn, Nebraska, a village
- Berwyn, Oklahoma, the former name of Gene Autry, Oklahoma
- Berwyn, Pennsylvania, a census-designated place
- Berwyn Township (disambiguation), multiple places

=== Elsewhere ===
- Berwyn, Alberta, Canada, a village
- Berwyn, Denbighshire, Wales, a settlement

== People ==
- Berwyn Jones (1940–2007), Welsh sprinter and rugby union and rugby league player
- Berwyn Price (born 1951), Welsh former hurdler
- Richard Jones Berwyn (1837–1917), early Welsh colonist in Patagonia
- Berwyn (musician), London-based rapper, songwriter and producer Berwyn Du Bois

== Other uses ==
- Berwyn School Fight (1932–1934), efforts to desegregate Pennsylvania public schools
- Berwyn station (disambiguation), stations of the name
- HM Prison Berwyn, Wrexham, Wales
- USS Berwyn (1918–1920), a United States Navy cargo ship

== See also ==
- Cadair Berwyn, a mountain summit in northeast Wales
- Cadair Berwyn North Top or Cadair Berwyn (Old Top), a top of Cadair Berwyn in north east Wales
