= Statue of Karel Havlíček Borovský, Prague =

Statue in Prague, Czech Republic

Statue of Karel Havlíček Borovský
- Socha Karla Havlíčka Borovského (Czech)
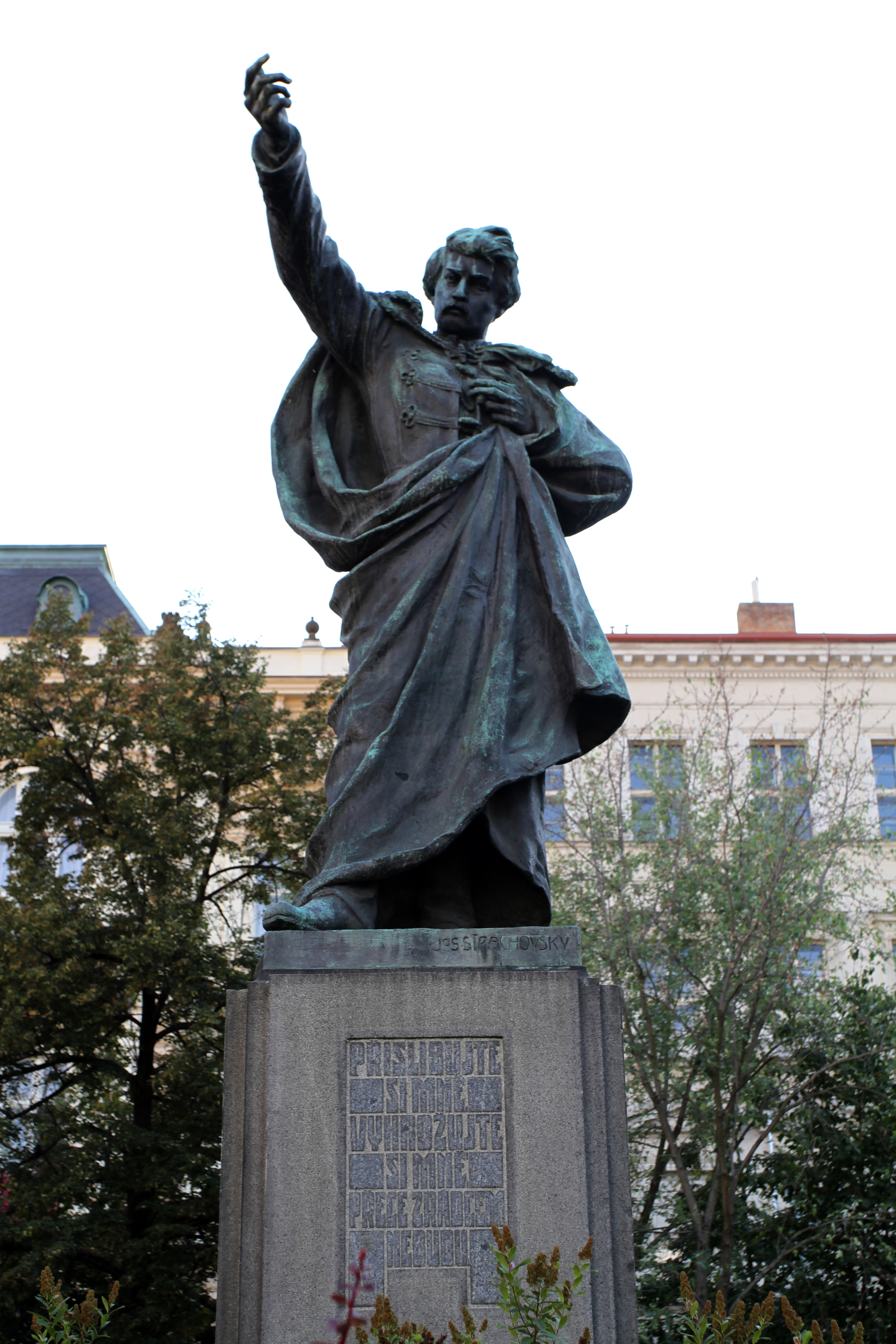
- The statue in 2012
- Type: Sculpture
- Location: Prague, Czech Republic; 50°5′6.39″N 14°27′15.34″E

The statue of Karel Havlíček Borovský (Czech: Socha Karla Havlíčka Borovského) is an outdoor sculpture in Žižkov, Prague, Czech Republic.

== See also ==
- Karel Havlíček Monument
