= Museum Campus =

Park in Chicago, Illinois

Coordinates: 41°51′59″N 87°36′51″W

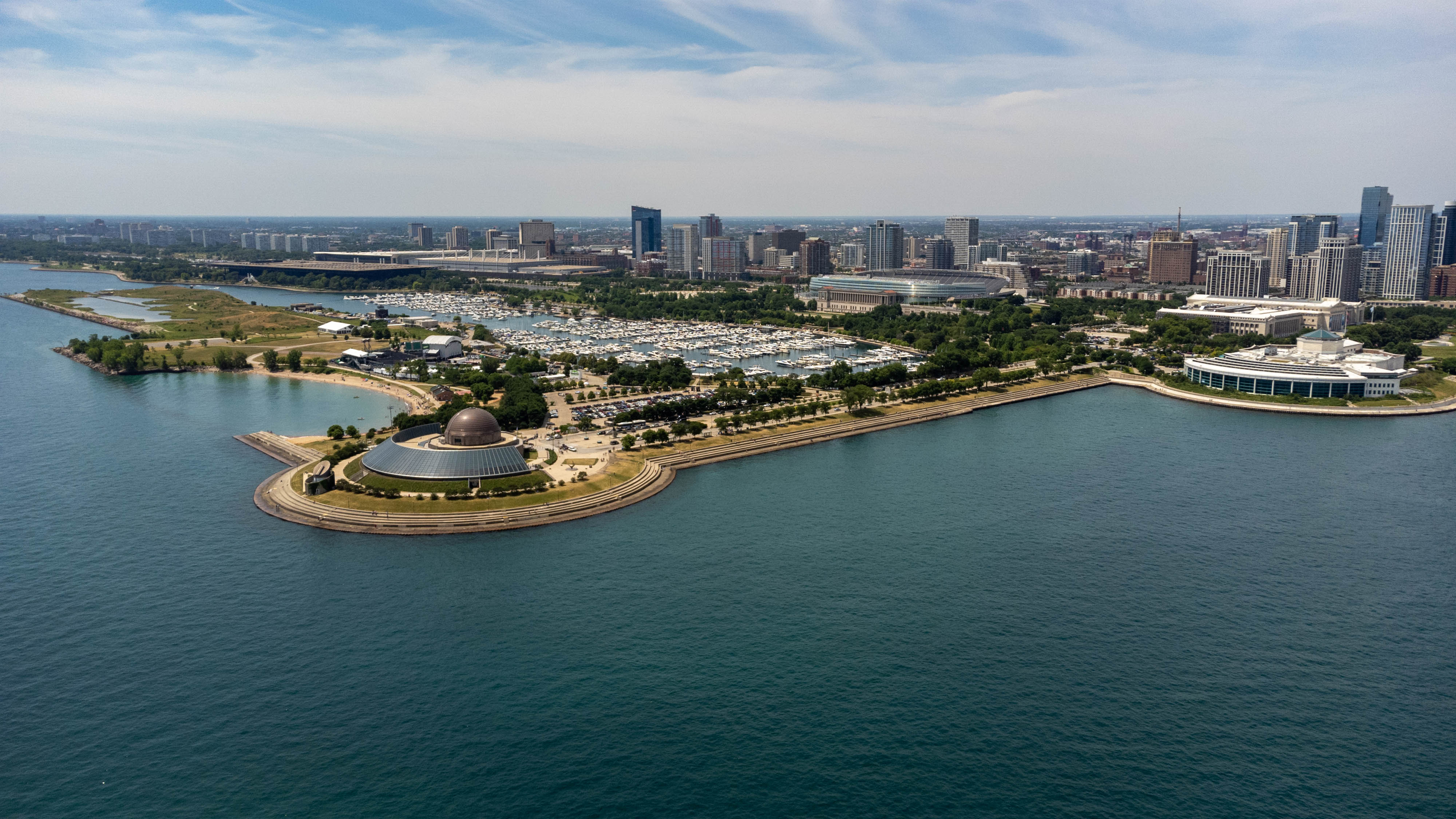
An aerial view of the Museum Campus (2022)

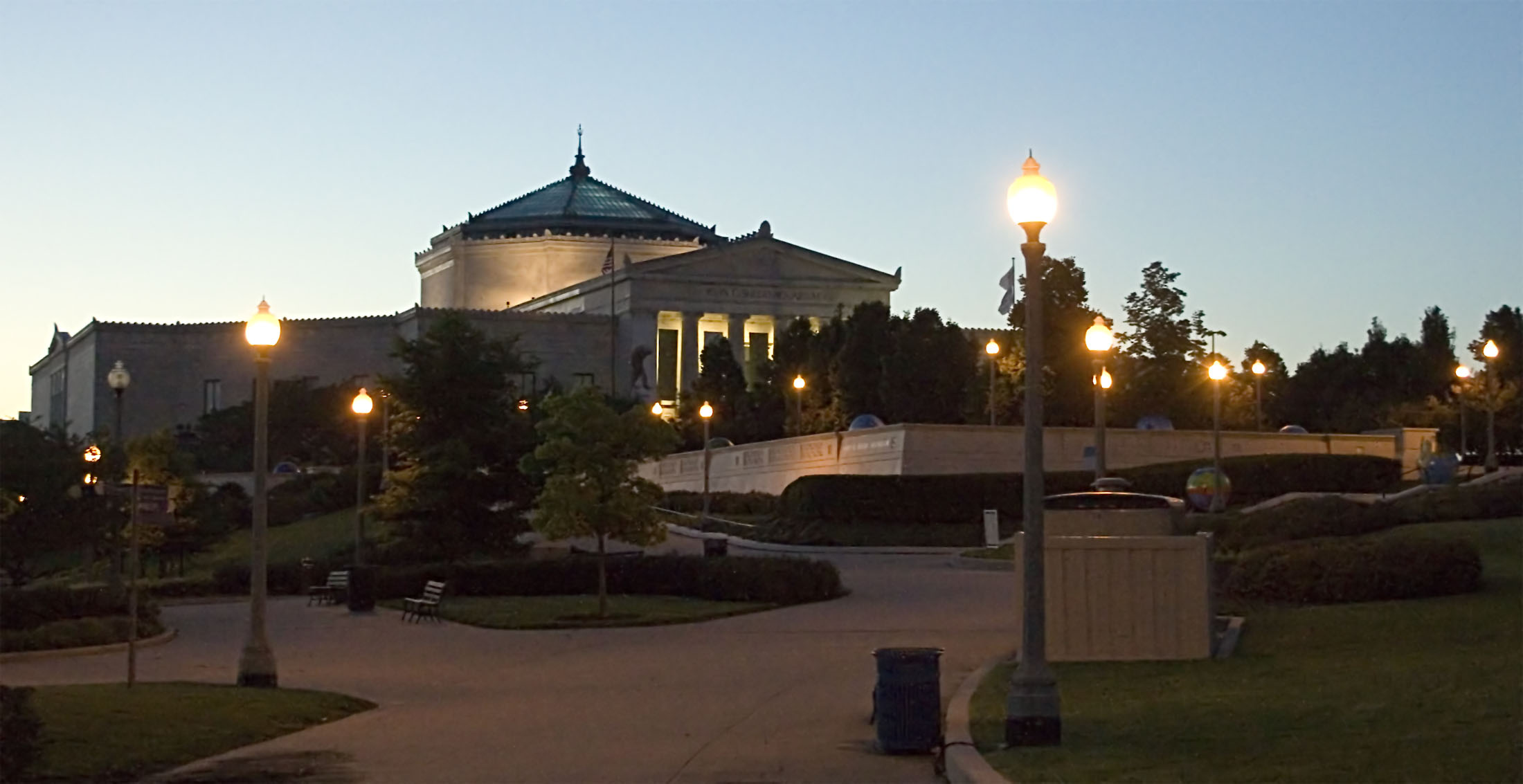
Shedd Aquarium in the Museum Campus at dawn (2007)

Museum Campus is a 57-acre (23 ha) municipal park in Chicago along Lake Michigan. It encompasses five of the city's major attractions: the Adler Planetarium (America's first planetarium), the Shedd Aquarium, the Field Museum of Natural History, Soldier Field (home of the Chicago Bears of the National Football League), and McCormick Place's Lakeside Center.

Spanning from Roosevelt Road in the north to the terminus of the Stevenson Expressway at Lake Shore Drive in the south, the Museum Campus consists of the southeastern portion of Grant Park, the entirety of Northerly Island, and the northern portion of Burnham Park.

== History ==
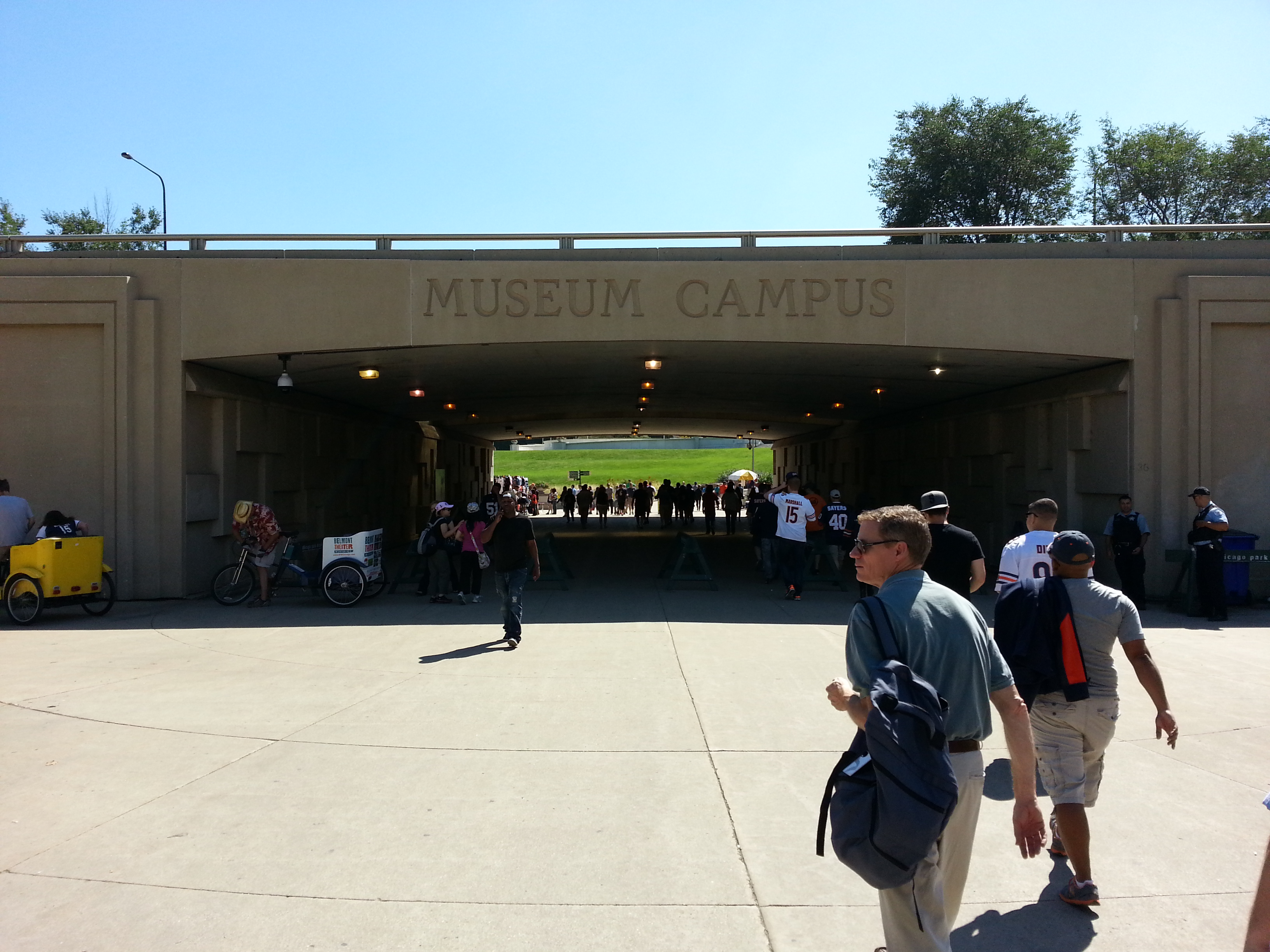
Pedestrian tunnel in the Museum Campus running underneath Lake Shore Drive (2014)

The Museum Campus opened on June 4, 1998, after the northbound lanes of Lake Shore Drive had been moved west of Soldier Field in 1996, freeing up 36 acres of land. It was created to transform the vicinity of three of the city's most notable museums – the Adler Planetarium, the Shedd Aquarium, and the Field Museum of Natural History – into a scenic pedestrian-friendly area. The area is landscaped with greenery and flora as well as jogging paths and walkways.

A picturesque promenade along Solidarity Drive, an isthmus, links Northerly Island to the mainland. The median of the drive itself is lined with a number of grand bronze monuments: a 1904 sculpture designed by Kazimierz Chodziński commemorating Thaddeus Kościuszko, relocated from Humboldt Park in 1978; a 1911 monument to Karel Havlíček Borovský relocated from Douglass Park in 1983; and a 1973 replica of a famous 19th-century statue in Warsaw, designed by Danish sculptor Bertel Thorvaldsen, depicting Nicholas Copernicus.

In celebration of the 2018 Illinois Bicentennial, the Museum Campus was selected as one of the Illinois 200 Great Places by the American Institute of Architects Illinois state office.

== Campus Museums ==
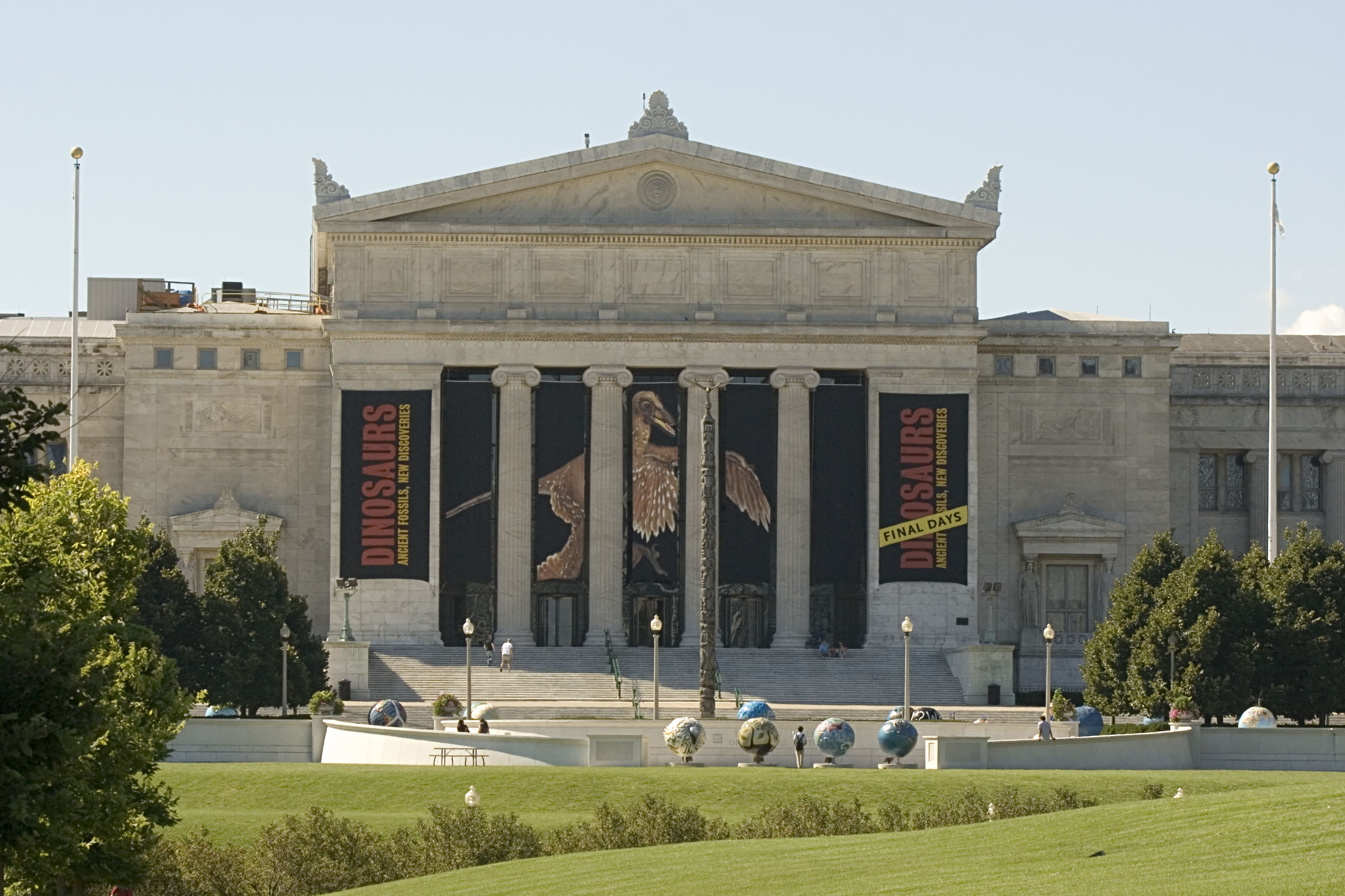
Field Museum of Natural History

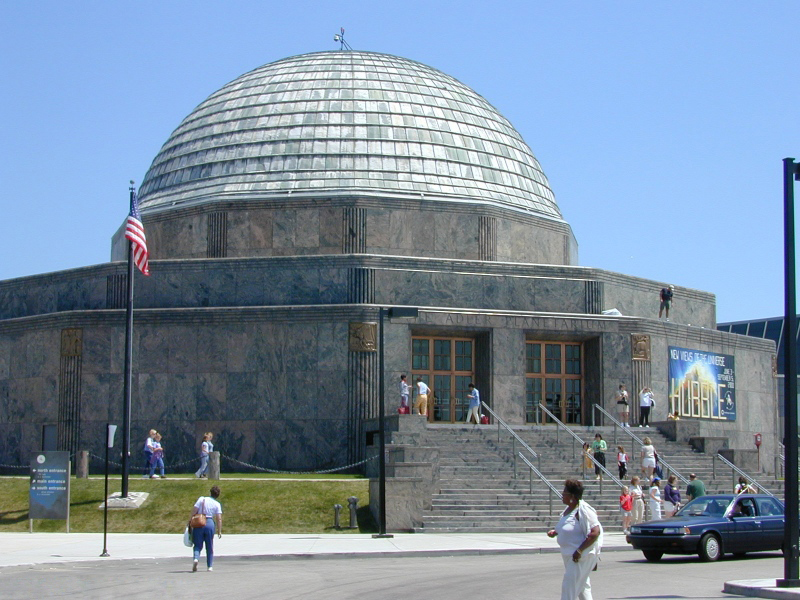
Adler Planetarium

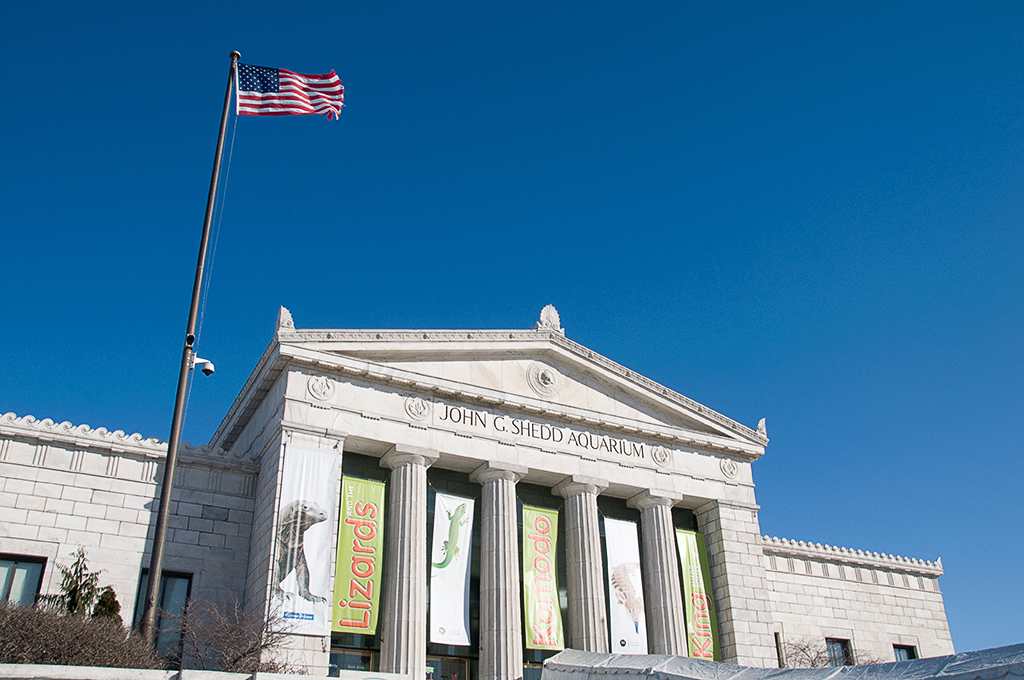
Shedd Aquarium

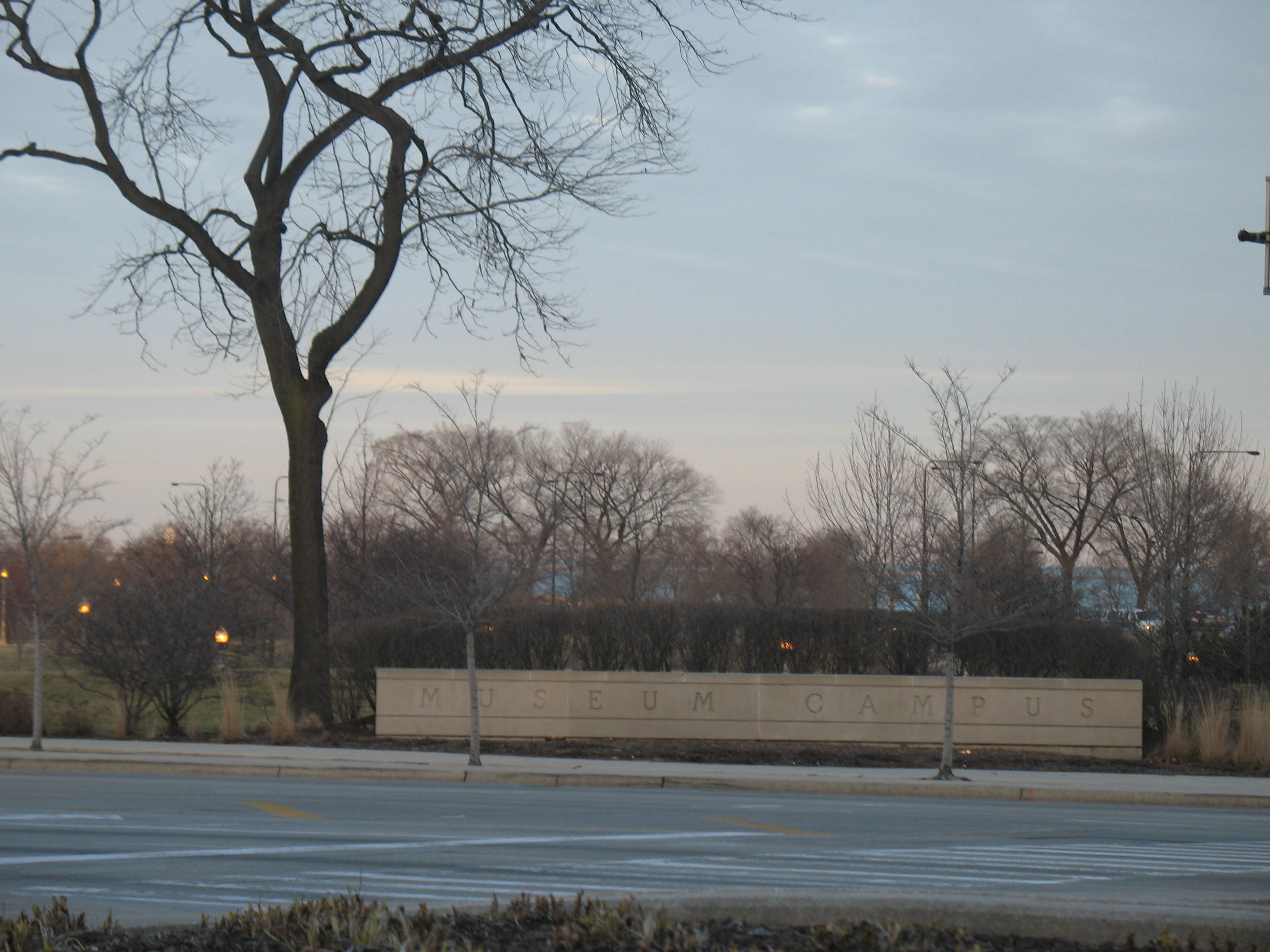
"Museum Campus" sign in Grant Park

== Museum Campus South ==
In 2014, a consortium of museums in or near the campus of the University of Chicago, formed Museum Campus South, which includes the Museum of Science and Industry, the Institute for the Study of Ancient Cultures, Robie House, DuSable Black History Museum, the Smart Museum of Art, and later joined by the Barack Obama Presidential Center. Also in 2014, filmmaker George Lucas selected Museum Campus South as the location of the Lucas Museum of Narrative Art, which would have cost an estimated $700 million, and expanded Museum Campus South along the city's waterfront. However, these plans were canceled in June 2016 due to opposition from the Friends of the Parks advocacy group.

== See also ==
- List of museums and cultural institutions in Chicago
