= Karel Havlíček Monument =

Monument in Chicago, Illinois, U.S.

- The memorial in 2011
- Artist: Joseph Strachovsky
- Subject: Karel Havlíček Borovský
- Location: Chicago, Illinois, United States; 41.866308°N 87.610443°W

The Karel Havlíček Monument is an outdoor monument and sculpture by Joseph Strachovsky commemorating Karel Havlíček Borovský, installed in the median of East Solidarity Drive, in Chicago's Northerly Island, in the U.S. state of Illinois. The statue was created in 1911 and originally located in Douglass Park. After requests from communities in Berwyn and Cicero in 1976 to move the statue, the statue was instead removed and installed in its current location in 1983.

== See also ==
- List of public art in Chicago
