= Berwyn station =

Berwyn station may refer to:

- Berwyn station (CTA), a Chicago "L" station
- Berwyn station (Metra), a Metra train station in Berwyn, Illinois, USA
- Berwyn station (SEPTA), a SEPTA train station in Berwyn, Pennsylvania, USA
- Berwyn railway station in Berwyn, Denbighshire, Wales

== See also ==
- Berwyn (disambiguation)
