= USS Berwyn =

Cargo ship of the United States Navy

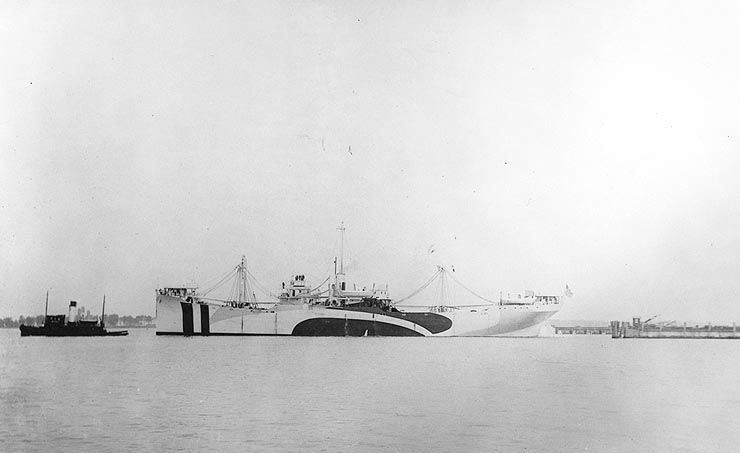
- SS Berwyn photographed off the Bethlehem Shipbuilding Corporation's Bethlehem Sparrows Point Shipyard at Sparrows Point, Maryland, on 26 September 1918 at the time of her completion, two days before her acquisition by the United States Navy. She is painted in dazzle camouflage.

History

United States
- Name: USS Berwyn
- Namesake: Previous name (for Berwyn, Illinois, Berwyn, Nebraska, Berwyn, New York, Berwyn, Oklahoma, and Berwyn, Pennsylvania) retained
- Builder: Maryland Steel Company, Sparrows Point, Maryland
- Launched: 17 August 1918
- Completed: 1918
- Acquired: 28 September 1918
- Commissioned: 28 September 1918
- Decommissioned: 10 May 1919
- Fate: Transferred to U.S. Shipping Board; Wrecked 6 September 1920
- Notes: Operated commercially as SS Berwyn 1919–1920

General characteristics
- Type: Cargo ship
- Displacement: 10,570 tons
- Length: 391 ft 9.5 in (119.418 m)
- Beam: 52 ft (16 m)
- Draft: 24 ft (7.3 m)
- Propulsion: One 2,500 ihp (1,864 kW) triple expansion steam engine, one shaft
- Speed: 11 knots
- Complement: 58
- Armament: 1 × 5-inch (127-mm) gun; 1 × 3-inch (76.2-mm) gun

USS Berwyn (ID-3565) was a United States Navy cargo ship in commission from 1918 to 1919. She saw service in the final weeks of World War I, then entered commercial service in 1919 as SS Berwyn. She was wrecked in 1920.

== Construction, acquisition, and commissioning ==
Berwyn was built in 1918 as the commercial cargo ship SS Berwyn for the United States Shipping Board by the Maryland Steel Company at Sparrows Point, Maryland. On 28 September 1918, the Shipping Board transferred her to the U.S. Navy at the Bethlehem Sparrows Point Shipyard for use during World War I; the Navy assigned her the naval registry identification number 3565 and commissioned her the same day as USS Berwyn (ID-3565).

== Operational history ==
Assigned to the Naval Overseas Transportation Service to operate on a United States Army account, Berwyn moved from Sparrows Point to Baltimore, Maryland, and loaded a cargo of ordnance bound for France. Underway late on 19 October 1918, Berwyn stood down the Chesapeake Bay and dropped anchor off Old Point Comfort, Virginia, on the morning of 20 October 1918. At 18:30 hours on 20 October 1918, almost seven hours after the ship had taken on board ammunition, Berwyn's crew discovered a fire in the number three hold. The blaze stubbornly resisted efforts to put it out, but the firefighters contained it and finally extinguished it early on 21 October 1918.

Resuming her voyage on 29 October 1918, Berwyn steamed for New York City, anchoring off the Statue of Liberty at 01:00 hours on 31 October 1918. Underway again on 1 November 1918 bound for France, Berwyn encountered much heavy weather along the way, shipping heavy seas over the after part of the ship that resulted in some of the deck cargo being jostled adrift by the action of the waves. Making landfall at the Île d'Yeu in France on 16 November 1918—five days after Armistice with Germany had ended World War I—Berwyn proceeded to Quiberon Bay, where she anchored that afternoon. Ordered to Nantes, France, on the morning of 17 November 1918, she reached that port late on 18 November 1918.

After discharging her cargo at Nantes, Berwyn took on board a return cargo that included airplanes and ammunition. Underway again on the morning of 2 December 1918, she labored through heavy seas on the return passage, eventually making landfall off Cape Henry, Virginia, on the afternoon of 19 December 1918. Continuing then up the Chesapeake Bay, she reached Baltimore on 20 December 1918 and commenced unloading her cargo. While she was there, workmen removed her guns and gun platforms.

Shortly after loading a cargo of hay, food, and gasoline, Berwyn left Baltimore for Hampton Roads, Virginia. She set out on her second voyage to France on 12 January 1919 and reached Quiberon Bay on the morning of 25 January 1919. On 27 January 1919, she received orders to proceed to Nantes because unloading facilities at St. Nazaire were filled to capacity. She reached Nantes late on 30 January 1919 and finally began unloading cargo early on 1 February 1919.

Taking on board a return cargo of 1,224 tons of ammunition and 230 tons of steel rails, Berwyn departed Nantes on 14 February 1919. On 25 February 1919, while still on her voyage to the United States, she was transferred from the U.S. Army account to the U.S. Shipping Board account. Reaching Baltimore on 1 March 1919, she unloaded her cargo there before heading for Savannah, Georgia, on 8 March 1919. She stopped at Savannah from 11 to 15 March 1919, during which time she took on board 3,129 tons of cotton, and then got underway for Liverpool, England, on 16 March 1919.

After unloading her cargo alongside King's Dock at Liverpool between 2 and 17 April 1919, Berwyn departed Liverpool in ballast on 17 April 1919. Shortly before making landfall on the United States East Coast, she received orders to put into New York City, and reached Pier 94, North River, dropping anchor at the foot of 57th Street in Manhattan at 11:30 hours on 2 May 1919. Underway on 3 May 1919, she shifted to Pier 45, Brooklyn, New York.

== Decommissioning and later career ==
Berwyn was decommissioned at Pier 45, Brooklyn, on 10 May 1919. She was transferred to the U.S. Shipping Board and stricken from the Navy List the same day. Third Officer A. W. Johnson of the U.S. Shipping Board assumed command on the ship—once again SS Berwyn—that day, and she soon began commercial operations under the Shipping Board.

During the summer of 1919, SS Berwyn carried general cargo to Liverpool, arriving there on 16 June 1919, before returning to Hampton Roads on 19 August 1919. She then proceeded to Galveston, Texas, where she loaded another general cargo between 29 August and 7 September 1919. Berwyn returned to European waters that autumn, reaching Liverpool on 6 October 1919. She then steamed to Norfolk, Virginia, before returning to Galveston on 3 December 1919. On 18 December 1919 she departed Galveston bound for Norfolk, then got underway from Norfolk for France, reaching Le Havre on 7 February 1920. She was reported as still in port there on 7 March 1920.

The French American Line, Inc., purchased Berwyn later in 1920. She was wrecked on 6 September 1920 on the Khuriya Muriya Islands in the Arabian Sea at approximately 17°44′N 056°38′E.
