= Havlíčkova Borová =

- Market town
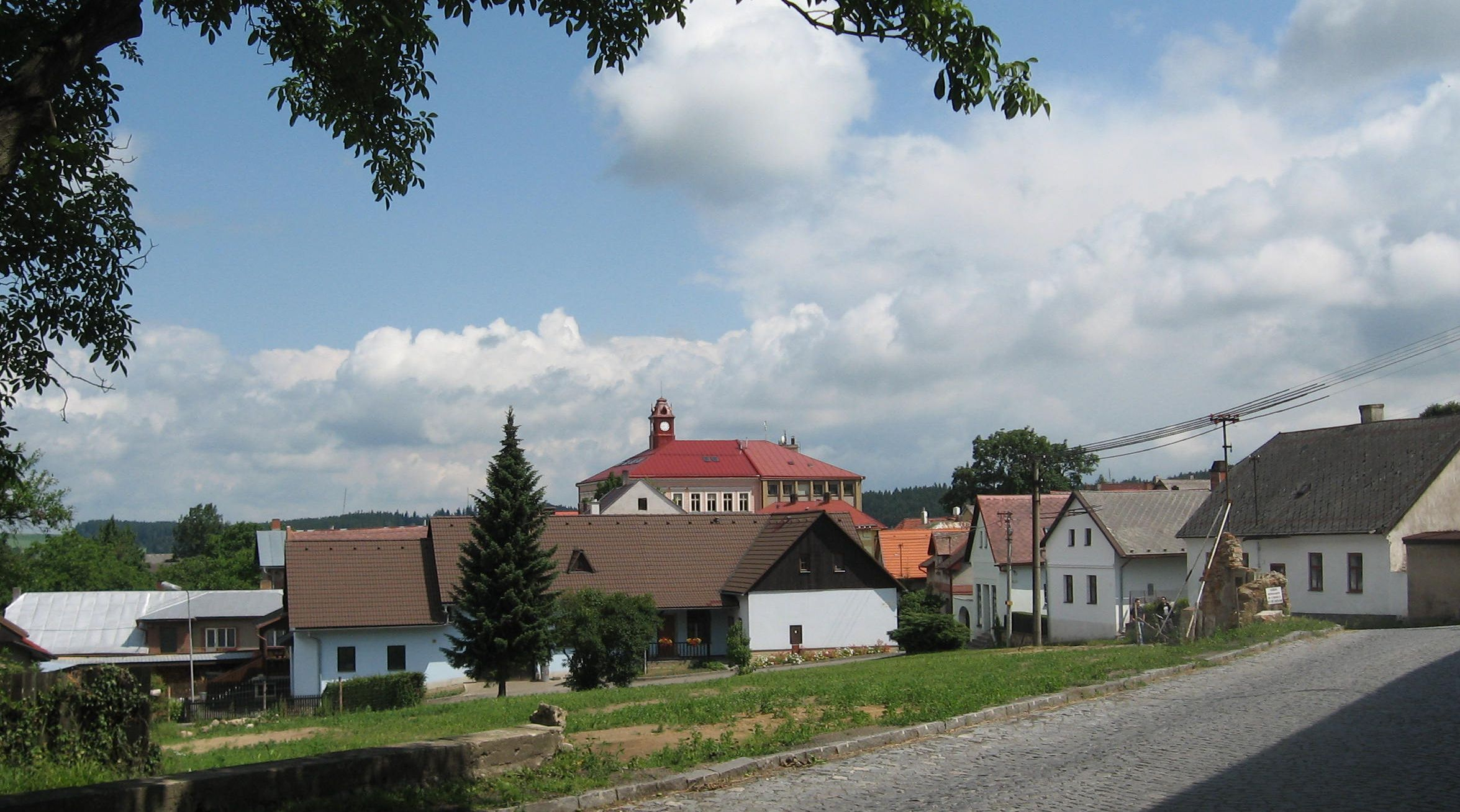
- View from the south

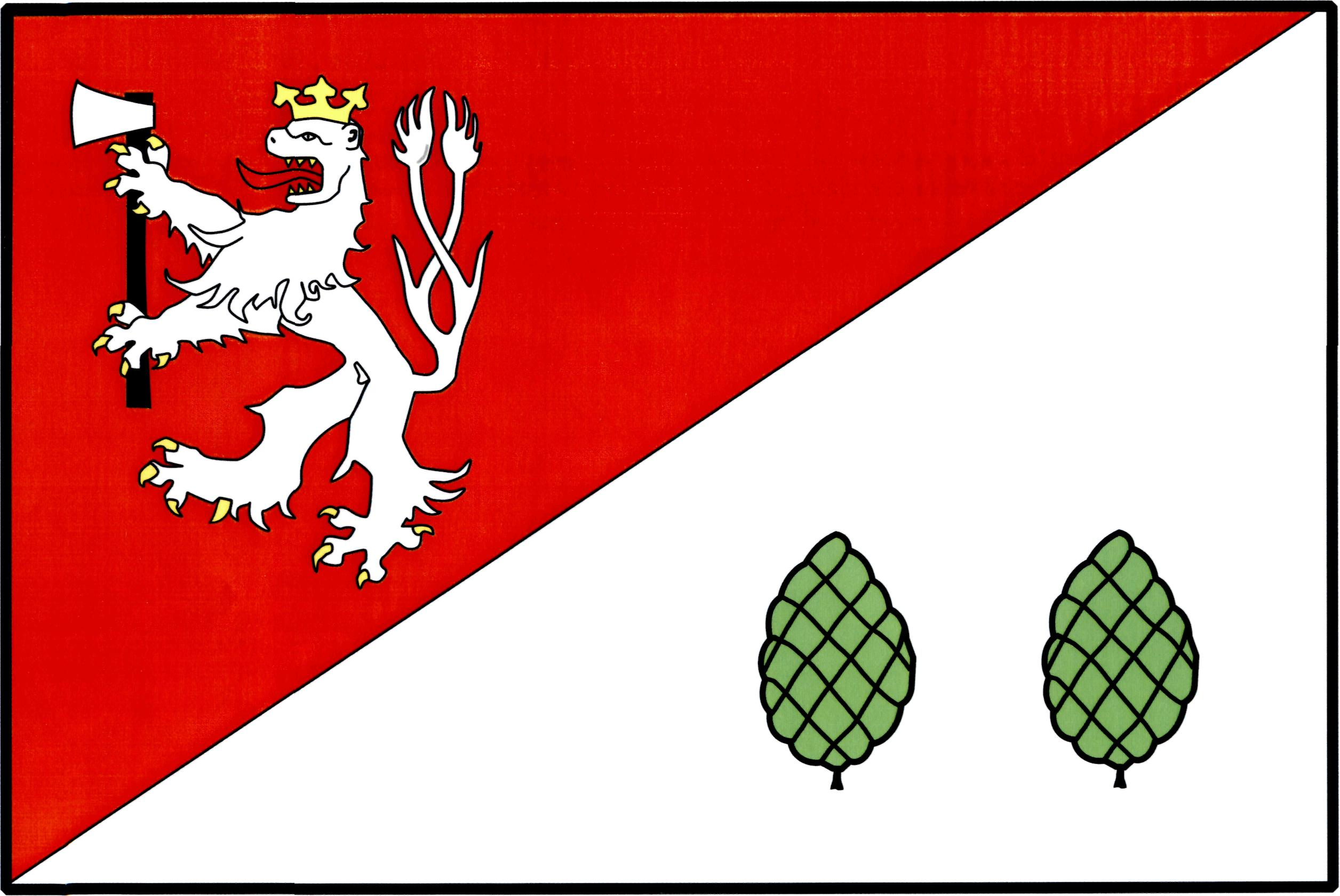
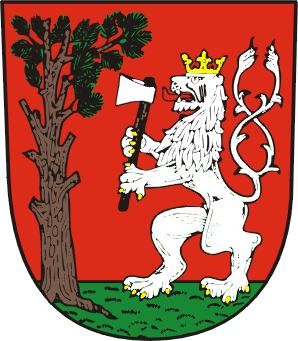
- Flag Coat of arms

- Location in the Czech Republic
- Coordinates: 49°38′9″N 15°46′54″E
- Country: Czech Republic
- Region: Vysočina
- District: Havlíčkův Brod
- First mentioned: 1289

Area
  - Total: 22.82 km^{2} (8.81 sq mi)
- Elevation: 586 m (1,923 ft)

Population (2026-01-01)
  - Total: 983
  - Density: 43.1/km^{2} (112/sq mi)
- Time zone: UTC+1 (CET)
  - Summer (DST): UTC+2 (CEST)
- Postal code: 582 23
- Website: www.havlickovaborova.cz

Havlíčkova Borová (Czech pronunciation: [ˈɦavliːtʃkova ˈborovaː]; until 1949 Borová; German: Borau) is a market town in Havlíčkův Brod District in the Vysočina Region of the Czech Republic. It has about 1,000 inhabitants. The market town is located on the stream Borovský potok, on the border between the Upper Sázava Hills and Křižanov Highlands.

Havlíčkova Borová is known as the birthplace of Karel Havlíček Borovský, and his birthplace is protected as a national cultural monument. The historic town centre is well preserved and is protected as an urban monument zone.

== Administrative division ==
Havlíčkova Borová consists of three municipal parts (in brackets population according to the 2021 census):

- Havlíčkova Borová (892)
- Peršíkov (54)
- Železné Horky (20)

== Etymology ==
The name Borová is an adjective derived from the Czech words borovice ('pine') and bor ('pine forest'). The settlement was most likely founded near a pine forest or in a pine forest. In 1949, the market town was renamed Havlíčkova Borová ('Havlíček's Borová') in honour of its famous native, Karel Havlíček Borovský.

== Geography ==
Havlíčkova Borová is located about 14 kilometres (9 mi) east of Havlíčkův Brod and 28 km (17 mi) northeast of Jihlava. Most of the municipal territory lies in the Upper Sázava Hills. Its eastern part extends into the northern tip of the Křižanov Highlands and includes thighest point of Havlíčkova Borová, which is the hill Henzlička at 692 metres (2,270 ft) above sea level. The stream Borovský potok originates here and then flows through the market town proper. The northeastern half of the municipal territory is situated within the Žďárské vrchy Protected Landscape Area.

== History ==
The first written mention of Borová is from 1289. In 1547, the village was promoted to a market town. During its heyday in the 19th century, a school and many houses were built, there were a lot of entrepreneurs who were able to make Borová self-sufficient, and the market town reached about 1,700 inhabitants.

== Demographics ==
Historical population

Year	Pop.	±%
1869	2,097	—
1880	2,212	+5.5%
1890	2,130	−3.7%
1900	2,097	−1.5%
1910	2,058	−1.9%

Year	Pop.	±%
1921	1,867	−9.3%
1930	1,718	−8.0%
1950	1,372	−20.1%
1961	1,315	−4.2%
1970	1,162	−11.6%

Year	Pop.	±%
1980	996	−14.3%
1991	942	−5.4%
2001	924	−1.9%
2011	944	+2.2%
2021	966	+2.3%

Source: Censuses

== Transport ==
There are no railways or major roads passing through the municipal territory.

== Sights ==
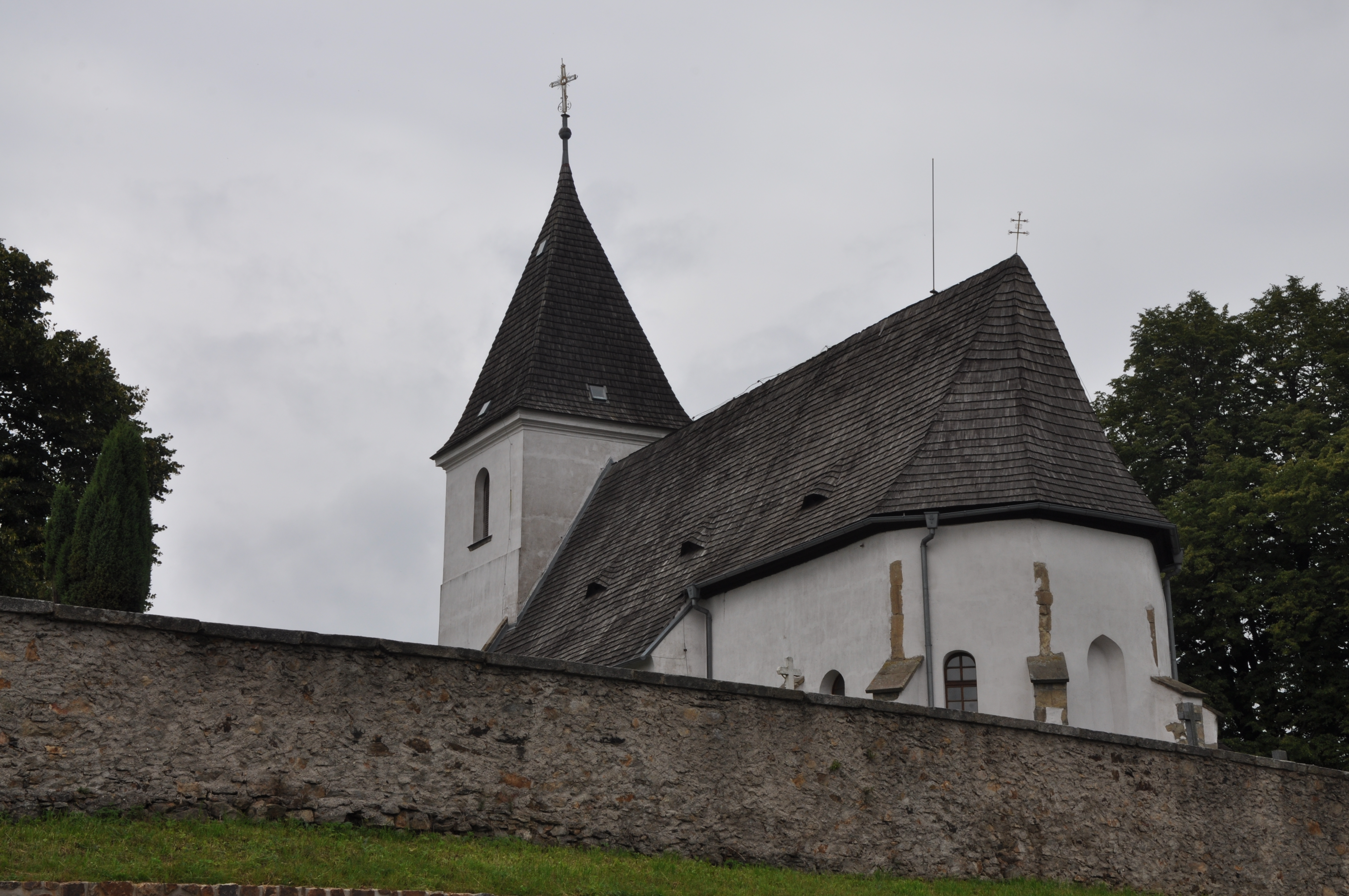
Church of Saint Vitus

The main landmark is the Church of Saint Vitus. It was built in the Gothic style in the 15th century.

The historic centre contains houses from the 19th century with Empire façades.

The birthplace of Karel Havlíček Borovský is a national cultural monument. Since 1931, the house has been used as a museum of his life and work.

== Notable people ==
- Karel Havlíček Borovský (1821–1856), writer and poet
