= Berwyn Township =

Berwyn Township may refer to:

- Berwyn Township, Cook County, Illinois
- Berwyn Township, Custer County, Nebraska
