= Karel Havlíček Borovský =

Czech journalist, writer, and politician (1821–1856)

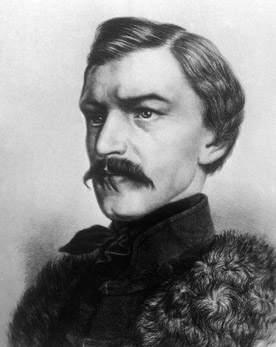
- Karel Havlíček Borovský
- Born: Karel Havlíček; 31 October 1821; Borová, Bohemia, Austrian Empire
- Died: 29 July 1856 (aged 34); Prague, Bohemia, Austrian Empire
- Education: Gymnasium in Německý Brod
- Occupations: Writer, journalist
- Spouse: Julie Havlíčková
- Children: Zdeňka Havlíčková
- Writing career
- Genre: Literary realism
- Notable works: Obrazy z Rus; Epigramy; Duch Národních novin Epištoly kutnohorské Tyrolské elegie Král Lávra (poem); Křest svatého Vladimíra

Karel Havlíček Borovský (Czech pronunciation: [ˈkarɛl ˈɦavliːtʃɛk ˈborofskiː]; 31 October 1821 – 29 July 1856) was a Czech writer, poet, critic, politician, journalist and publisher.

== Early life and education ==
Karel Havlíček was born in Borová, Bohemia, Austrian Empire (today Havlíčkova Borová, Czech Republic, named after Borovský). He lived and studied at the gymnasium in Německý Brod (today Havlíčkův Brod, named after Borovský), and his house on the main square is today the Havlíček Museum. In 1838 he moved to Prague to study philosophy at Charles University and, influenced by the revolutionary atmosphere before the Revolutions of 1848, decided on the objective of becoming a patriotic writer. He devoted himself to studying Czech and literature. After graduating he began studying theology because he thought the best way to serve the nation would be as a priest. He was expelled after one year for "showing too little indication for spiritual ministry".

== Career ==
After failing to find a teacher's job in Bohemia, he left for Moscow to work as a tutor in a Russian teacher's family: with a recommendation by Pavel Jozef Šafárik. He became a Russophile and a Pan-Slav, but after recognizing the true reality of the Russian society he took the pessimistic view that "Pan-Slavism is a great, attractive but feckless idea". His memories of the Russian stay were published first in magazines and then as a book Obrazy z Rus (Pictures from Russia).

He returned to Bohemia in 1844, aged 24 and used his writing skills to criticise the fashion of embracing anything written in the recently reborn Czech language. He specifically aimed at a novel by Josef Kajetán Tyl. In 1846 Havlíček attained a position as editor of the Pražské noviny newspaper with the help of František Palacký.

In April 1848 he changed the name of the newspaper to Národní noviny (National News) and it became one of the first newspapers of the Revolutionary-era Czech liberals, and one of the most influential publications of 1848–1849. Národní noviny became popular especially for his sharp-tongued epigrams and its wit. Havlíček was concerned with the preparations of the Slavic Congress in Prague. In July 1848 he was elected as a member of the Austrian Empire Constituent Assembly in Vienna and later in Kroměříž. He eventually relinquished his seat to focus on journalism.

Havlíček was a "liberal nationalist" politically, but refused to allow a "party line" to inform his opinions. Often, he would criticise those that agreed with him as much as those that disagreed. He excoriated revolutionaries for their radicalism, but also advocated ideas like universal suffrage—a concept altogether too radical for most of his fellow liberals. He was a pragmatist, and had little patience for those that spent their time romanticising the Czech nationality without helping it achieve political or cultural independence. He used much of the space in his newspapers to educate the people on important issues—stressing areas like economics, which were sorely neglected by other nationalist writers.

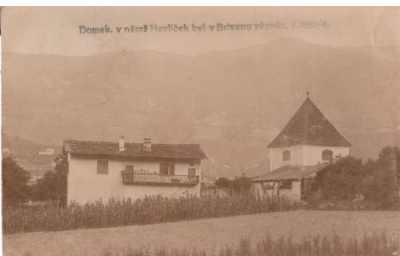
House in Brixen where Havlíček was interned (1851–1855)

The Bohemian revolution was defeated in March 1849 with the dissolution of the Kroměříž assembly, but Havlíček continued to criticise the new regime. He was brought to court for his criticism (there was no freedom of the press in the Habsburg's territory) but was found not guilty by a sympathetic jury. Národní noviny had to cease publication in January 1850, but Havlíček did not end his activities. In May 1850 he began publishing the magazine Slovan in Kutná Hora. The magazine was a target of censorship from the start. It had to stop publication in August 1851, and Havlíček stood again at the court to answer on charges of dissent. Again, he was found not guilty by a sympathetic jury of Czech commoners.

Havlíček translated and introduced some satirical and critical authors into the Czech language culture including Nikolai Gogol (1842) and Voltaire (1851).

In the night of 16 December 1851, he was arrested by the police and forced into exile in Brixen, Austria (present-day Italy). He was depressed from the exile, but continued writing and wrote some of his best work: Tyrolské elegie (Tyrolean Elegies), Křest svatého Vladimíra (The Baptism of St. Vladimir) and Král Lávra (King Lavra, based on the legend of Labraid Loingsech).

When he returned from Brixen in 1855, he learned that his wife had died a few days earlier. Most of his former friends, afraid of the Bach system, stood aloof from him. Only a few publicly declared support for him.

In 1856, Havlíček died of tuberculosis, aged 34. Božena Němcová put a crown of thorns on his head in the coffin. His funeral was attended by about 5,000 Czechs.

== Memorials ==
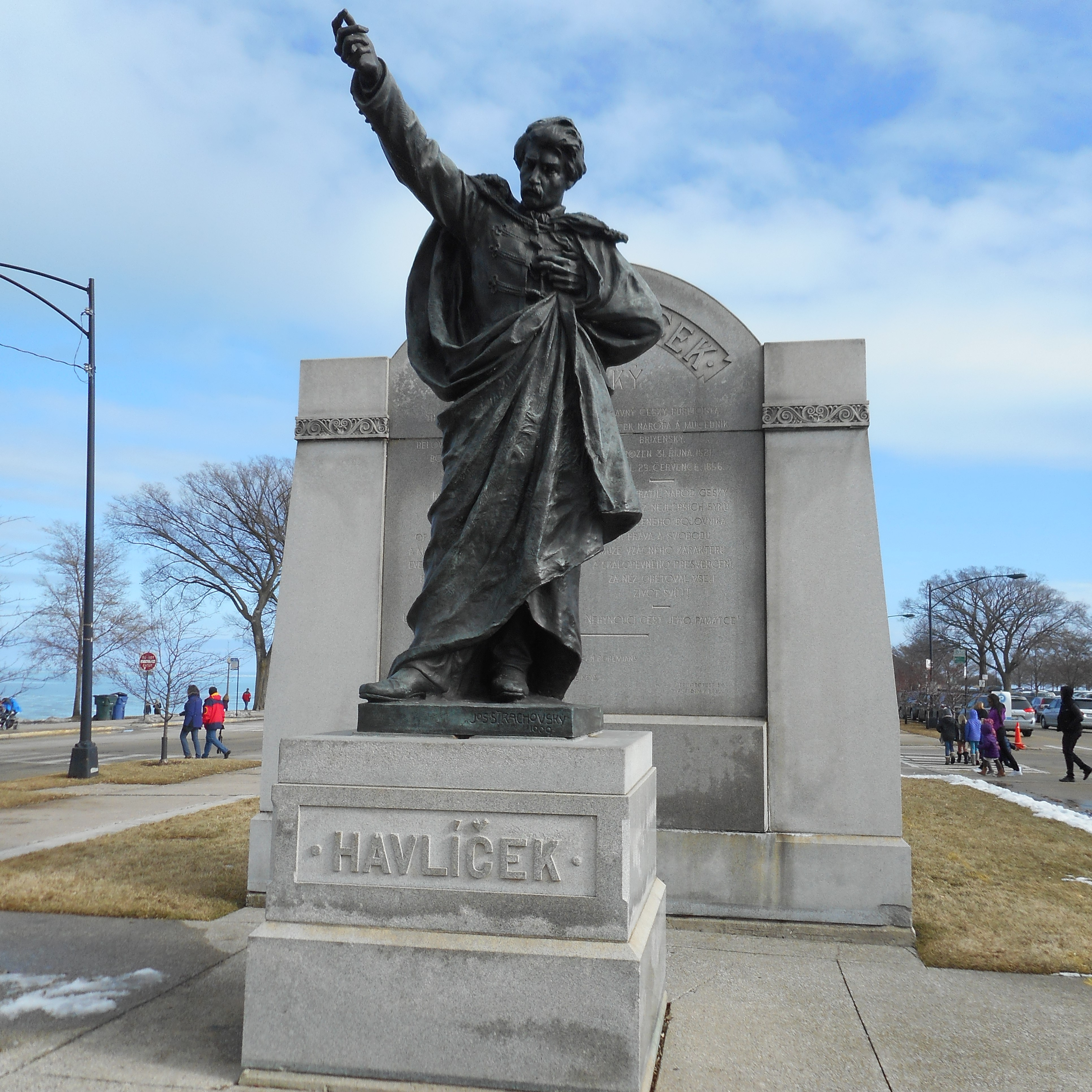
Bronze statue of Karel Havlíček Borovský, signed "V. Mašek Praha 1910" on Solidarity Drive, Museum Campus, Chicago, Illinois

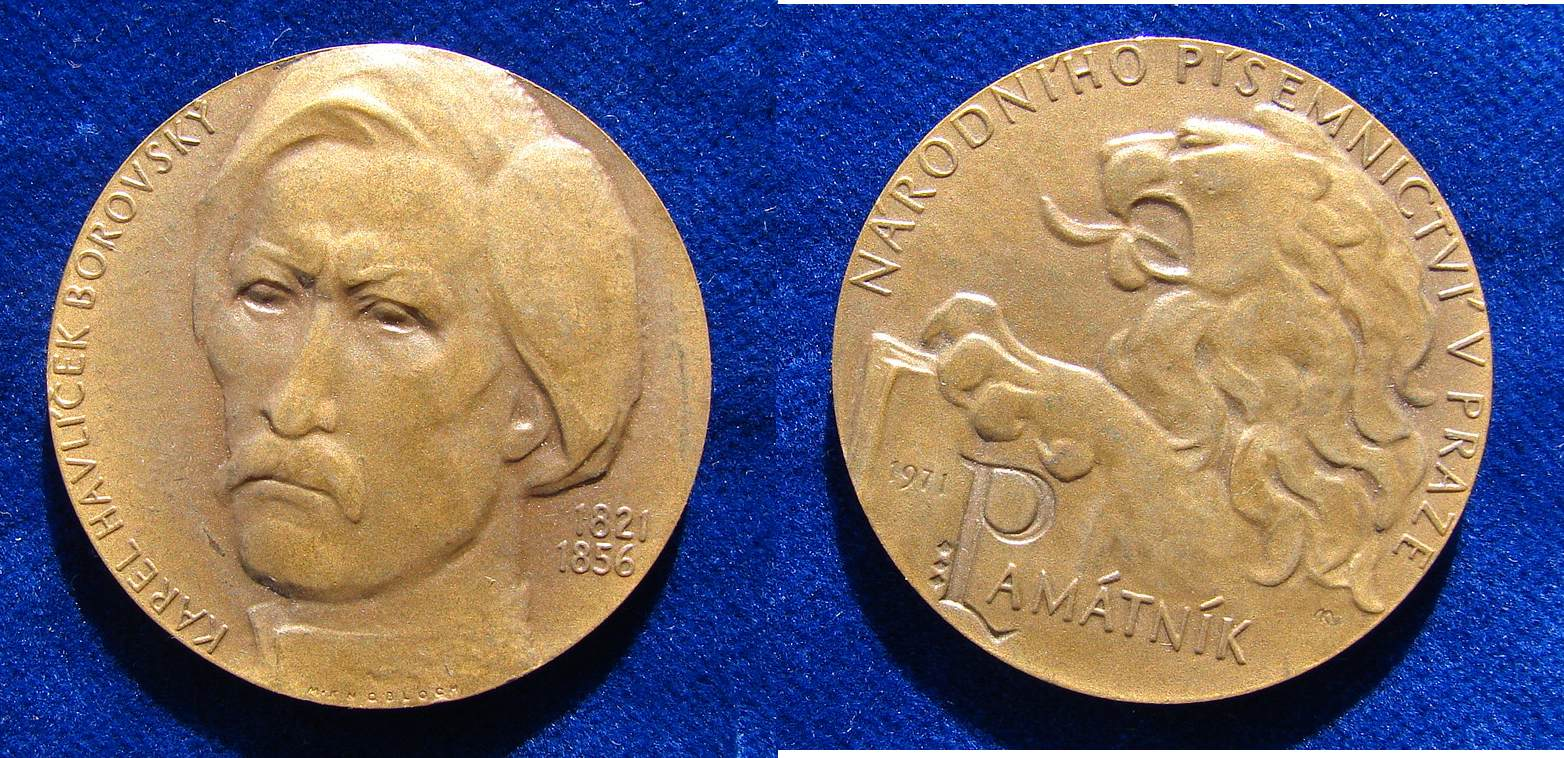
Czech Bronze Medal Havel Borovský 150th Anniversary

In 1911, a monument was raised to Havlíček in Chicago by Czech residents of the city in Douglass Park. The bronze statue by Joseph Strachovsky was cast by V. Mašek in Prague and shows Havlicek in a revolutionary pose, dressed in a full military uniform and a draped cape with his outstretched arm motioning the viewer to join him. The statue was moved to Solidarity Drive on today's Museum Campus in the vicinity of the Adler Planetarium in 1981.

In 1918, the new Rifle Regiment of the 3rd division of Czechoslovak legions in Russia was named the "Karel Havlíček Borovský regiment"

In 1925, a biographical film was released.

In 1945, the 20 Czechoslovak koruna banknote bore Havlíček's portrait.

== See also ==
- Statue of Karel Havlíček Borovský, Prague
