= Douglass Park =

Park in Illinois, United States

Coordinates: 41.86°N 87.70°W

Douglass (Anna and Frederick) Park
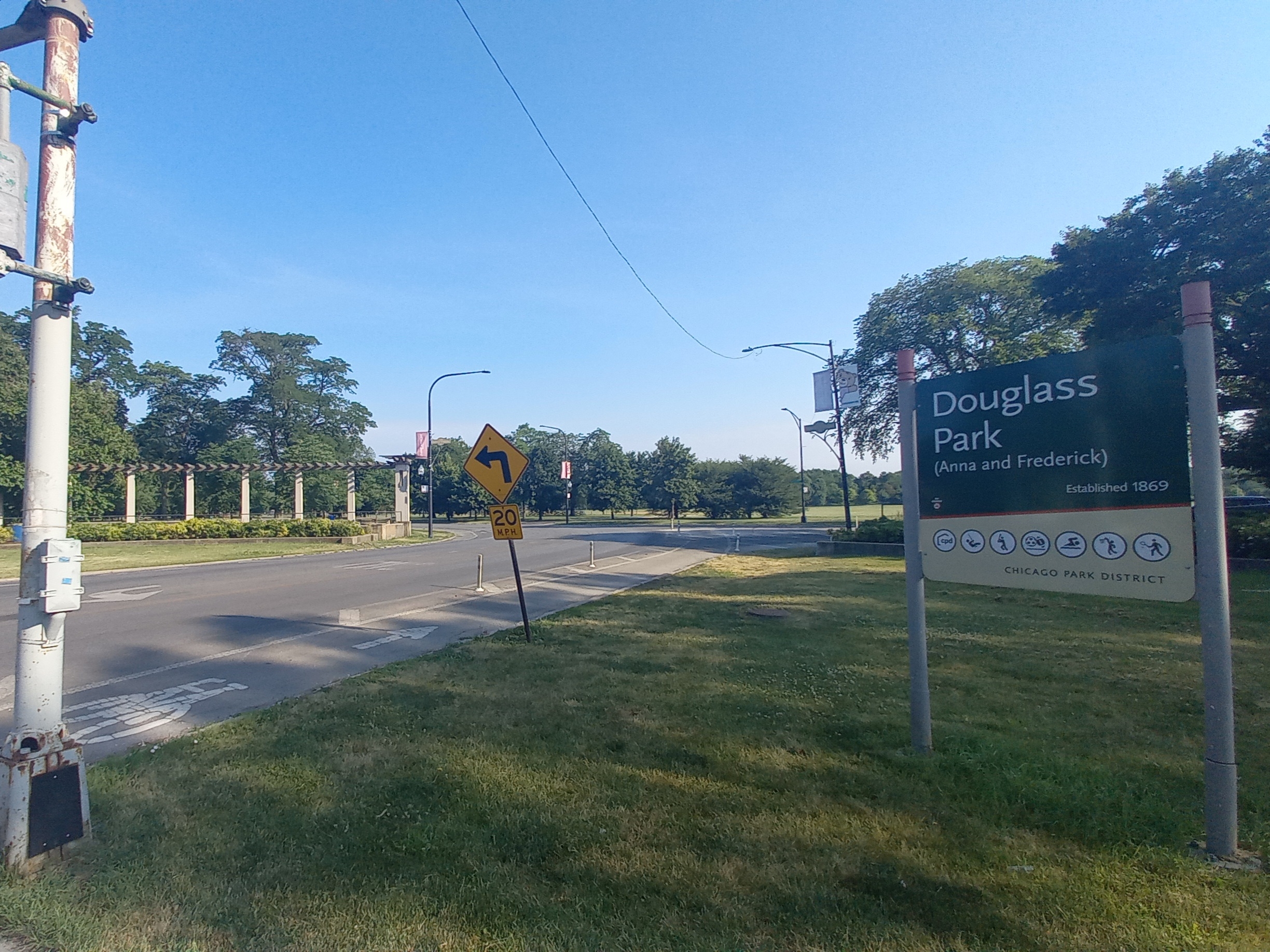
- Sacramento Drive at Douglass Park
- Interactive map of Douglass (Anna and Frederick) Park
- Type: Municipal
- Location: Chicago, Cook County, Illinois
- Area: 173 acres (0.70 km^{2})
- Operator: Chicago Park District
- Open: All year

Douglass Park (formerly Douglas Park) is a part of the Chicago Park District on the West Side of Chicago, Illinois. Established in 1869 and initially named South Park, its 173 acres (0.70 km^{2}) are in the North Lawndale community area with an official address of 1401 S. Sacramento Drive.

Opened in 1871, the park was originally named for U.S. Senator Stephen A. Douglas. In 2020, the park was renamed Douglass (Anna and Frederick) Park, for abolitionist Frederick Douglass and his wife Anna Murray Douglass.

Riot Fest is held annually each summer at Douglass Park, causing controversy among some neighborhood residents.

== History ==
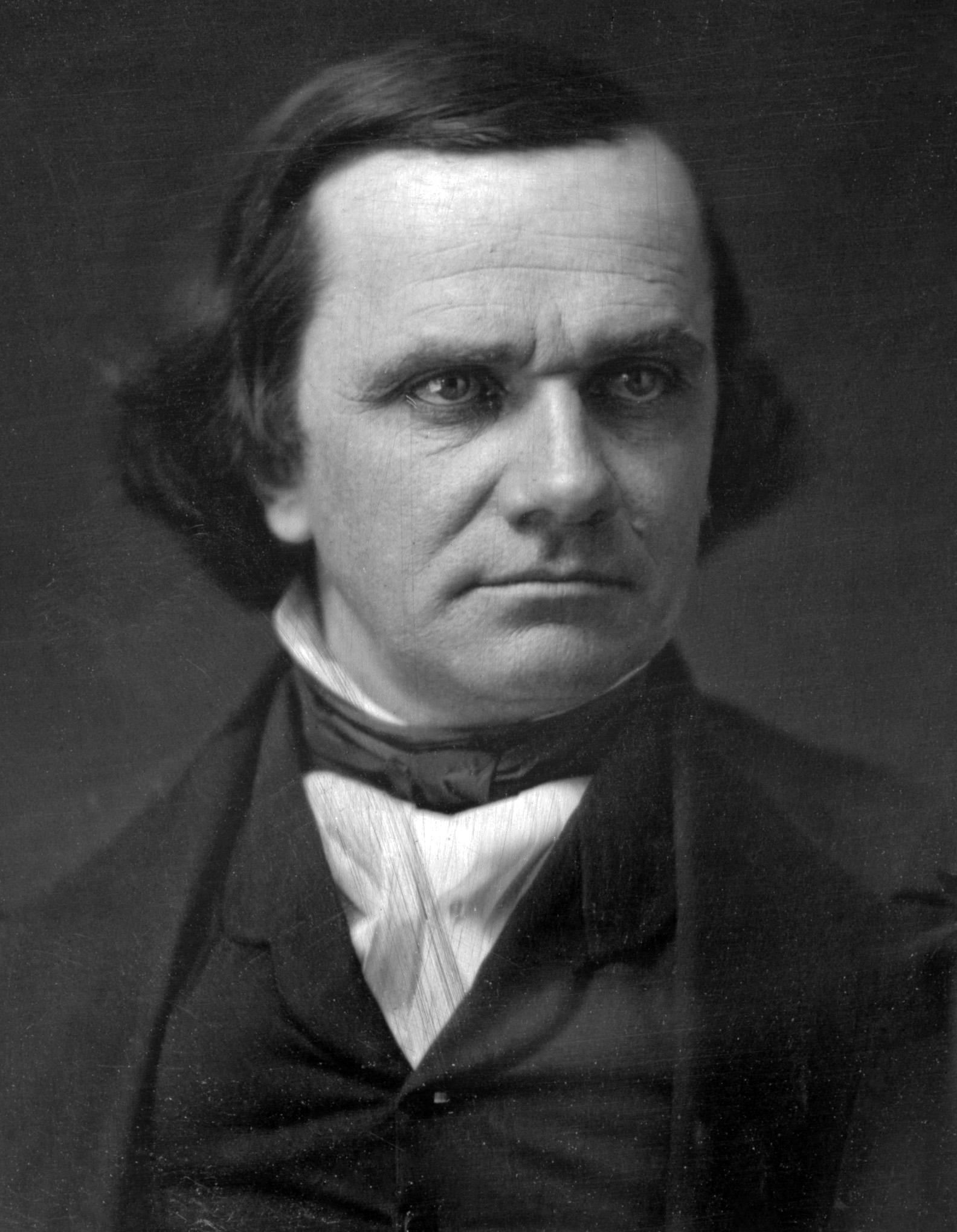
The park was named for Illinois politician and presidential candidate Stephen A. Douglas for over 151 years.

In 1869, the Illinois state legislature established the West Park Commission, which was responsible for three large parks and interlinking boulevards. Later that year, on November 4, 1869, the commissioners named the southernmost park in honor of Stephen A. Douglas (1813–1861). Best remembered for his pre-Civil War presidential defeat by Abraham Lincoln despite superb oratorical skills, Douglas was a United States Senator who helped bring the Illinois Central Railroad to Chicago. In 1871, designer William Le Baron Jenney completed plans for the entire West Park System which included Douglas, Garfield, and Humboldt parks. Jenney's engineering expertise was especially helpful for transforming Douglas Park's poor natural site into parkland. He had manure from the Union Stock Yards and sand added to the marshy site. This process brought the 173 acres (0.70 km^{2}) of land to grade level. In the center of the landscape, Jenney created a picturesque lake, and a small section of the park was formally opened in 1879. Inflated construction costs and post Great Chicago Fire tax collection difficulties resulted in phased projects. The first improvements were made to the park by Oscar DuBuis in the 1880s. Between 1886 and 1888 Douglas Park, like the other West Park System parks, replaced its greenhouse with a conservatory. In 1895, members of several German turners' clubs petitioned for an outdoor gymnasium, and the following year one of Chicago's first public facilities was constructed with an outdoor gymnasium (pictured right), swimming pool, and natatorium.

=== 20th-century redevelopment ===
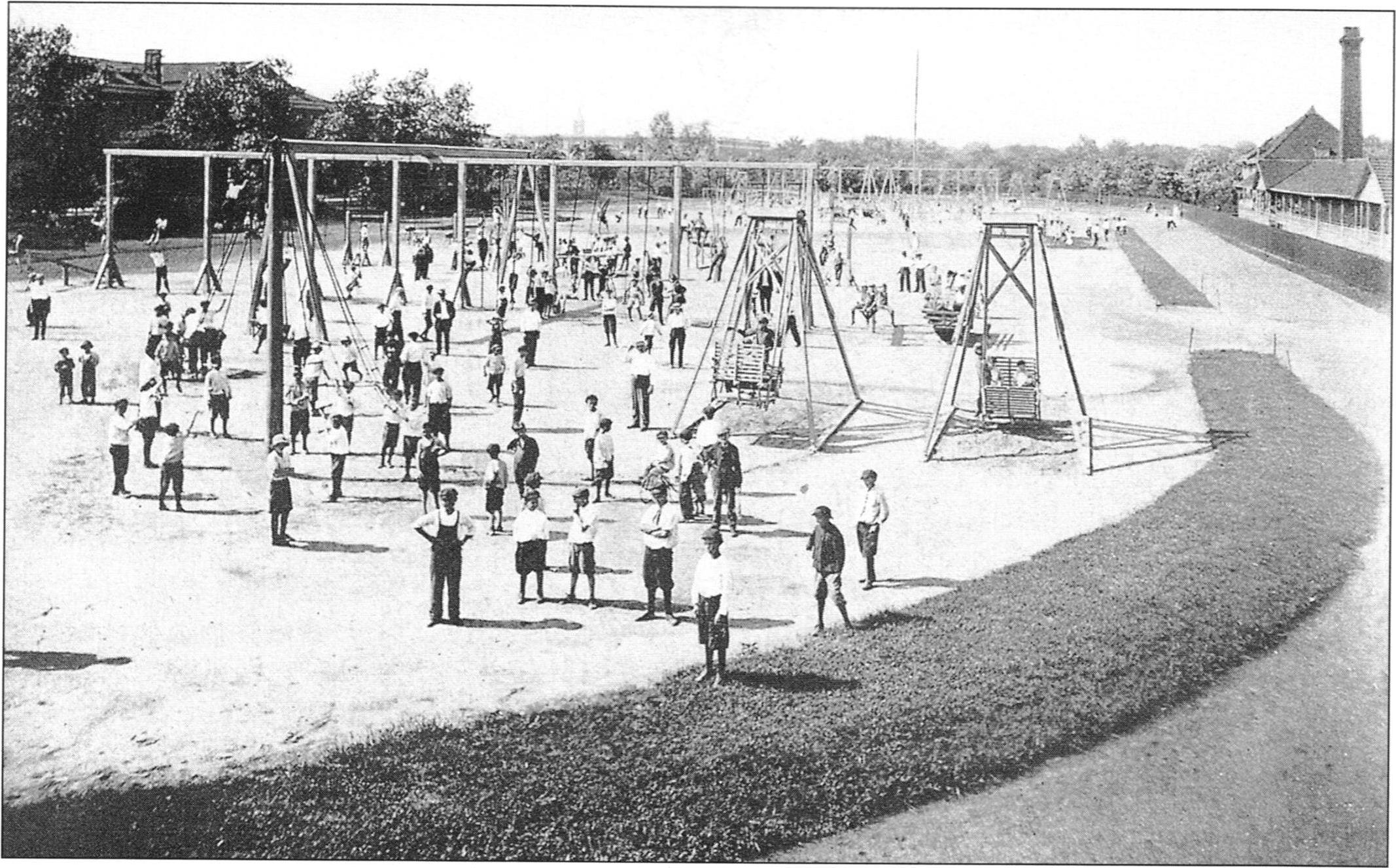
Outdoor gymnasium, 1916

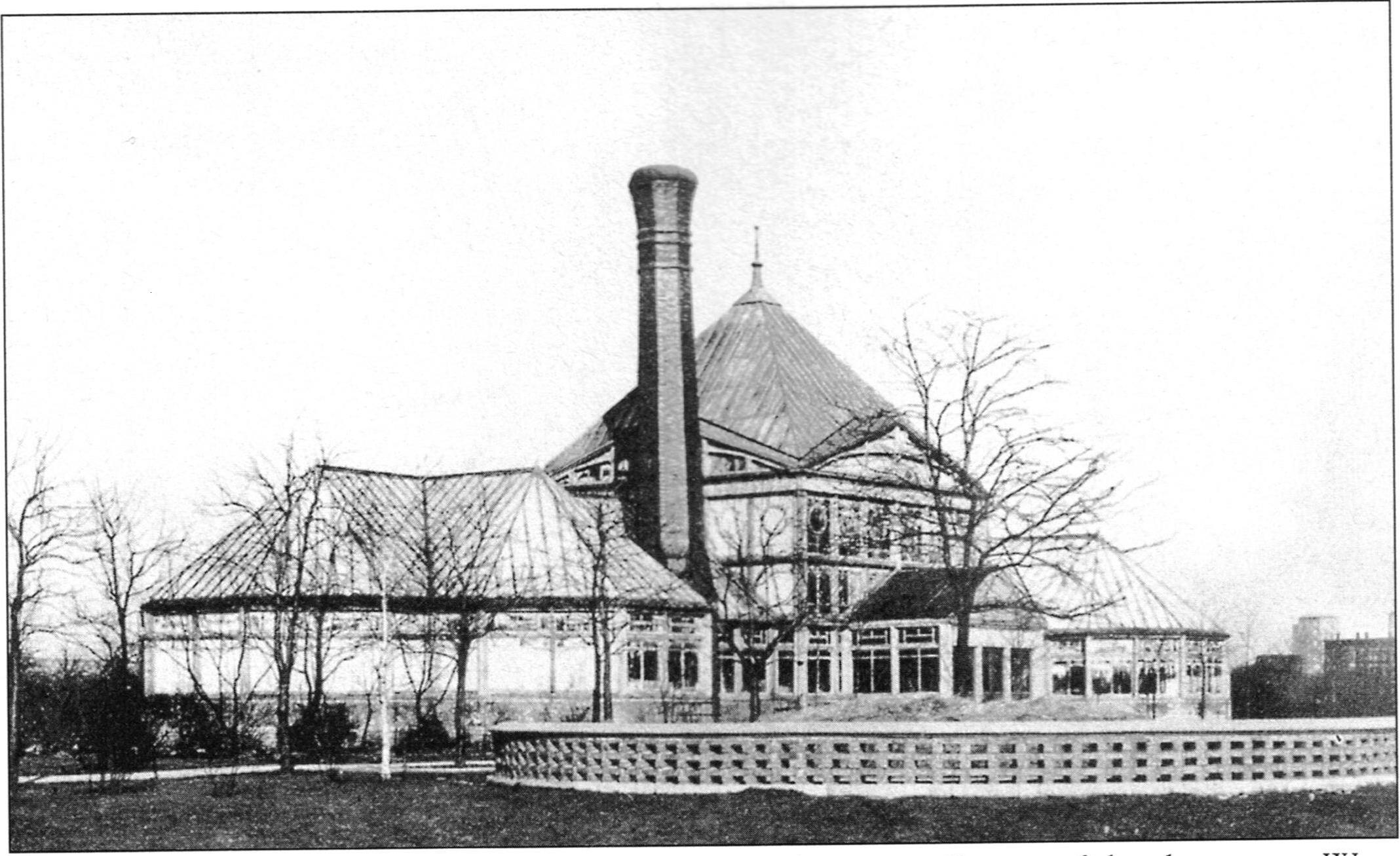
Douglass Park Greenhouse, which was torn down in 1905

By the turn of the century, the West Park Commission was riddled with political graft, and the three parks became dilapidated. As part of a reform effort in 1905, Jens Jensen was appointed as General Superintendent and Chief Landscape Architect for the entire West Park System. Jensen, now recognized as dean of the prairie style of landscape architecture, improved deteriorating sections of the parks and added new features. Among Jensen's improvements were a semi-circular entryway at Marshall Boulevard, and a formal garden at the corner of Ogden Avenue and Sacramento Drive. By the time Jensen designed the garden, Ogden Avenue, a diagonal roadway with a major streetcar thoroughfare that would later become part of Route 66, had already been constructed. The road divided the park into two separate landscapes, creating a busy intersection at the junction of Ogden and Sacramento Avenues. Jensen's solution was a long axial garden on the southeast side of the intersection, providing a buffer between Ogden Avenue and playing fields to the south. Jensen demolished the conservatories in each of the West Park System parks in favor of one grand conservatory at Garfield Park.

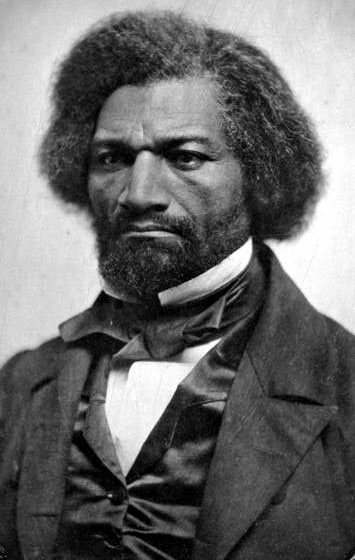
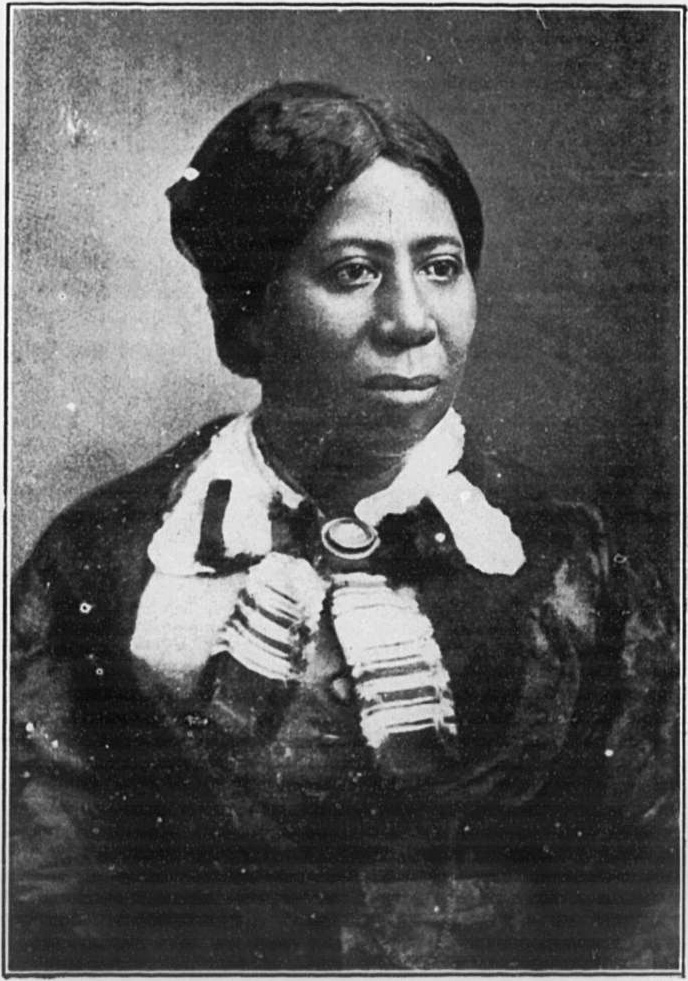
In 2020 the park was renamed for the abolitionist Frederick Douglass and his wife Anna Murray Douglass.

At the entrance to the garden, the area closest to the busy roadway intersection, Jensen placed a monumental garden shelter, known as Flower Hall, and a formal reflecting pool. The designer of the structure is unknown, however, it was possibly Jensen himself, or his friend, prairie school architect Hugh Garden. East of the building, the garden becomes more naturalistic. Jensen included perennial beds, a lily pool, and unique prairie-style benches. In 1928, the West Park Commission constructed a fieldhouse in Douglas Park. The structure was designed by architects Michaelsen and Rognstad, who were also responsible for other notable buildings including the Garfield Park Gold Dome Building, the Humboldt and LaFolette Park Fieldhouses, and the On Leong Merchants Association Building in Chinatown. In 1934, Douglas Park became part of the Chicago Park District, when the city's 22 independent park commissions merged into a single citywide agency.

In 2017, students launched a petition to rename the park for Frederick Douglass and his wife, and presented a proposal to the park district board in 2019. In 2020, noting it had never held a vote to change the name of any park from a historical person in its history, the Chicago Park District Board approved the change.

== Structures and events ==
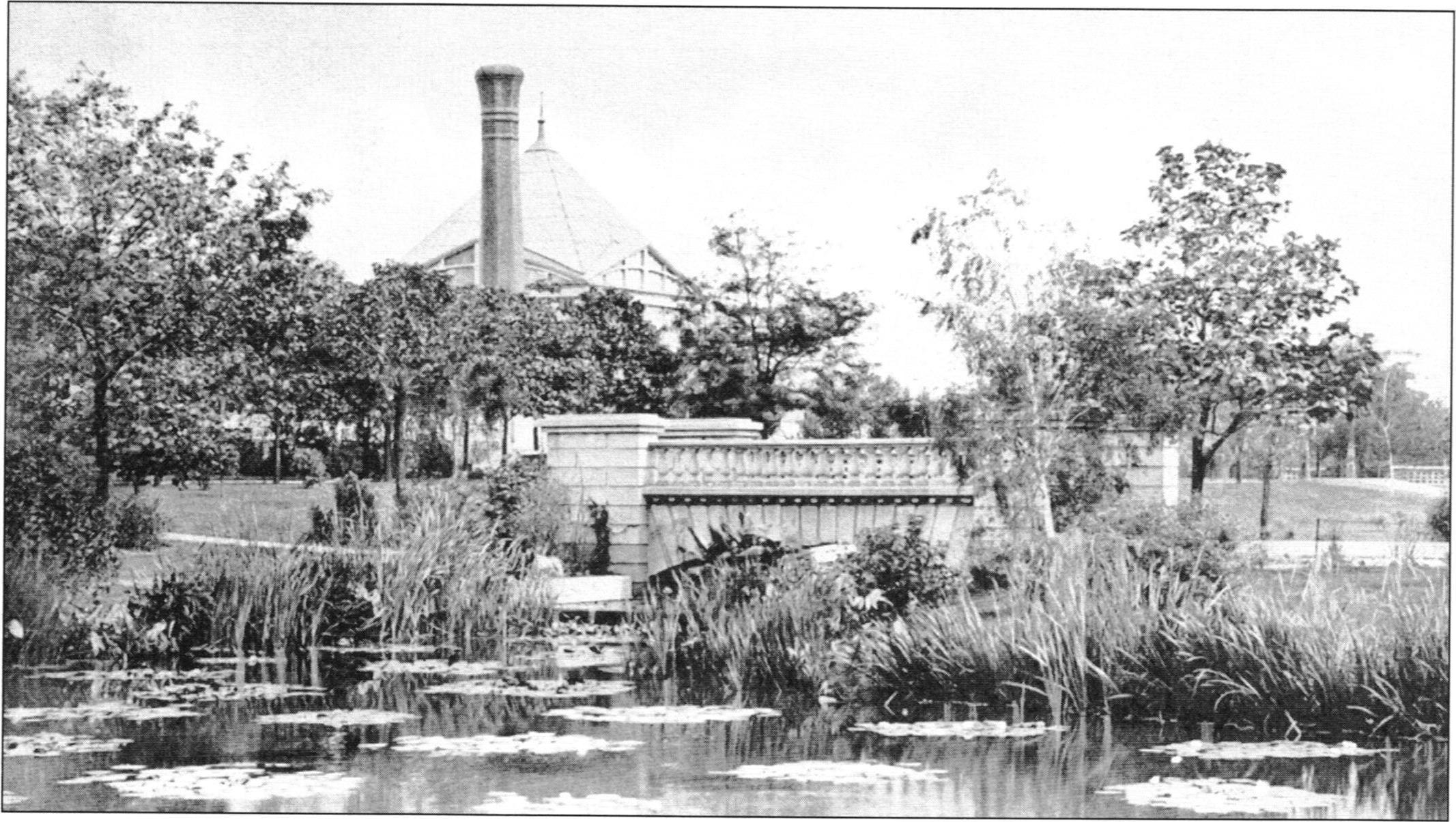
This stone bridge pictured in front of the old Greenhouse is one of the few remnants of Jenney's original park designs.

The park has served as a central location for recreation since it was first built. It currently houses a miniature golf course, five playgrounds, an outdoor swimming pool, soccer fields, basketball courts, and an oval running track. The park also retains its original lagoon, a wide variety of trees, and the original Jenney-designed stone bridge. The greenhouse that attracted visitors from throughout the city was torn down in 1905. The statue of Czech patriot, Karel Havlíček Borovský, by Joseph Strachovsky was moved to Solidarity Drive on today's Museum Campus in the vicinity of the Adler Planetarium in 1981.

Chicago's 2016 Olympic bid included plans to host the Olympic cycling competitions in the park, including a velodrome and a BMX course. Beginning in 2015, the park is the new home of the Riot Fest. From 2018 to 2022, it was also the host of the Lyrical Lemonade hip-hop music festival.

== See also ==
- Parks of Chicago
- List of landmarks in Chicago
