= HM Prison Berwyn =

Adult-male prison in Wrexham, Wales

HMP Berwyn
- Location in Wrexham
- Location: Wrexham, Wrexham County Borough; 53°2′7.09″N 2°55′35.86″W
- Security class: Adult Male/Category C
- Capacity: 2,106
- Population: 1,301 (July 2019)
- Opened: 28 February 2017; 9 years ago
- Managed by: HM Prison Service
- Governor: Rebecca Hayward

HM Prison Berwyn (Welsh: Carchar Berwyn EF; Welsh: ['bɛrwɪn]) is a £250 million Category C adult male prison in Wrexham County Borough, Wales. It is the largest prison in the UK, opened in 2017, and is operated by His Majesty's Prison Service.

== Name ==
The prison's name was announced by then-Governor Russ Trent on 17 February 2016. The name Berwyn comes from the elements of Middle Welsh barr ('summit, peak') and gwyn ('white'). A spokesperson for the National Offender Management Service (NOMS) said that the prison had been named after the Welsh mountain range. The original shortlist of six names was: Bridgeway, Marcher, Cerrig Tân, Dee Vale, Whittlesham and Y Berwyn. These names were suggested by local schools, communities and historical societies.

== Structure ==
The prison is split into three houses, the first, Bala opening in February 2017 and the other two, Alwen and Ceiriog in the autumn. Each section can hold different communities including one for armed forces veterans.

== Operation ==
It was designed to house 2,100 men and to be the cheapest to run Category C prison in the country, with a projected cost of £14,000 (equivalent to £17,900 in 2025) per inmate. However as of 2019, it was still incomplete, only 60% full and cost £36,000 (equivalent to £46,100 in 2025) per inmate that year.

=== Enforced cell sharing ===
The prison was planned to be at 75% capacity by the end of 2017 but in June 2018, 16 months after opening, the prison was still only half full. At the time, it was suggested that this was due to the contentious design of the prison, which requires a high proportion of prisoners to share cells, to cut costs. Prior to the design of Berwyn, the Prison Service worked on the basis that one person to a cell was the norm.

In 2023, Liz Saville Roberts, Plaid Cymru MP, raised concerns about the prison, stating it had almost surpassed the 2,000 cell capacity for the first time since operating. She also claimed many cells had been trashed and not repaired, putting them out of usage.

== Controversies ==
=== The 'Bala controversy' ===
In 2017, some of the nearly 1,900 residents of Bala, a town 34 miles (55 km) west and in a different county than the prison, were angered by the use of their town's name for one of the prison's houses, with a petition being started, to get the name changed. The petition received over 400 signatures.

=== Suspension of Governor ===
The first governor, Russ Trent who had also served as project director, was suspended on 21 August 2018 following unspecified allegations. He returned to work after the investigation concluded with no action taken by the Prison Service. Nick Leader assumed the role of Governor in April 2019.

=== Three guards jailed for affairs with inmates ===
In January 2023, it was revealed that three female guards at the prison had been jailed in the preceding three years for having illegal affairs with inmates. In March, a Freedom of Information request found that 18 female members of staff were either suspected of having, or did have, inappropriate relationships with inmates.
