= Berwyn Township, Custer County, Nebraska =

Berwyn Township
- Township
- Location in Custer County
- Coordinates: 41°19′55″N 099°30′00″W
- Country: United States
- State: Nebraska
- County: Custer

Area
  - Total: 74.91 sq mi (194.02 km^{2})
  - Land: 74.91 sq mi (194.02 km^{2})
  - Water: 0 sq mi (0 km^{2}) 0%
- Elevation: 2,400 ft (730 m)

Population (2020)
  - Total: 229
  - Density: 3.06/sq mi (1.18/km^{2})
- GNIS feature ID: 0837877

Berwyn Township is one of thirty-one townships in Custer County, Nebraska, United States. The population was 229 at the 2020 census. A 2021 estimate placed the township's population at 228.

The Village of Berwyn lies within the Township.

== See also ==
- County government in Nebraska
