= Berwyn, Nebraska =

Village in Custer County, Nebraska, United States

- Village
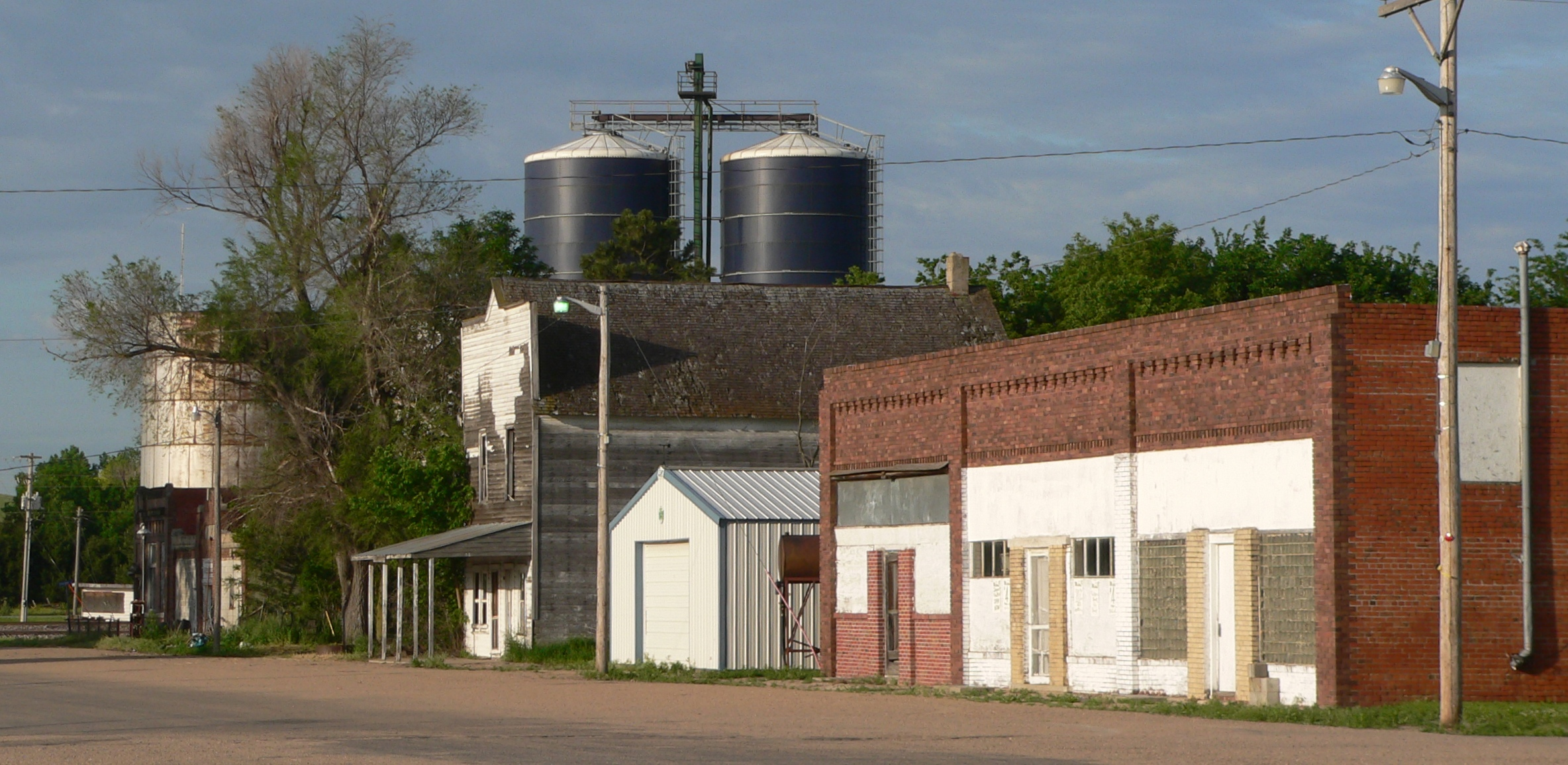
- Downtown Berwyn

- Location of Berwyn, Nebraska

- Location within Nebraska Location within the United States
- Coordinates: 41°21′03″N 99°30′02″W
- Country: United States
- State: Nebraska
- County: Custer
- Township: Berwyn

Area
  - Total: 0.25 sq mi (0.66 km^{2})
  - Land: 0.25 sq mi (0.66 km^{2})
  - Water: 0 sq mi (0.00 km^{2})
- Elevation: 2,375 ft (724 m)

Population (2020)
  - Total: 75
  - Density: 293.7/sq mi (113.38/km^{2})
- Time zone: UTC-6 (Central (CST))
  - Summer (DST): UTC-5 (CDT)
- ZIP codes: 68814, 68819
- Area code: 308
- FIPS code: 31-04650
- GNIS feature ID: 2398107
- Website: www.berwynne.org

Berwyn is a village in Custer County, Nebraska, United States. As of the 2020 census, Berwyn had a population of 75.

== History ==
Berwyn was laid out in 1886 when the railroad was extended to that point. It was likely named for a railroad official.

== Geography ==
According to the United States Census Bureau, the village has a total area of 0.26 square miles (0.67 km^{2}), all land.

== Demographics ==
Historical population
Census	Pop.	Note	%±
1920	205		—
1930	196		−4.4%
1940	170		−13.3%
1950	138		−18.8%
1960	104		−24.6%
1970	110		5.8%
1980	104		−5.5%
1990	122		17.3%
2000	134		9.8%
2010	83		−38.1%
2020	75		−9.6%
U.S. Decennial Census

=== 2010 census ===
As of the census of 2010, there were 83 people, 38 households, and 23 families living in the village. The population density was 319.2 inhabitants per square mile (123.2/km^{2}). There were 48 housing units at an average density of 184.6 per square mile (71.3/km^{2}). The racial makeup of the village was 94.0% White, 4.8% Native American, and 1.2% from other races. Hispanic or Latino of any race were 1.2% of the population.

There were 38 households, of which 23.7% had children under the age of 18 living with them, 44.7% were married couples living together, 7.9% had a female householder with no husband present, 7.9% had a male householder with no wife present, and 39.5% were non-families. 34.2% of all households were made up of individuals, and 13.2% had someone living alone who was 65 years of age or older. The average household size was 2.18 and the average family size was 2.70.

The median age in the village was 45.2 years. 16.9% of residents were under the age of 18; 13.1% were between the ages of 18 and 24; 19.3% were from 25 to 44; 40.8% were from 45 to 64; and 9.6% were 65 years of age or older. The gender makeup of the village was 50.6% male and 49.4% female.

=== 2000 census ===
As of the census of 2000, there were 134 people, 46 households, and 33 families living in the village. The population density was 524.6 inhabitants per square mile (202.5/km^{2}). There were 50 housing units at an average density of 195.8 per square mile (75.6/km^{2}). The racial makeup of the village was 99.25% White and 0.75% Asian. Hispanic or Latino of any race were 2.24% of the population.

There were 46 households, out of which 50.0% had children under the age of 18 living with them, 67.4% were married couples living together, 2.2% had a female householder with no husband present, and 26.1% were non-families. 23.9% of all households were made up of individuals, and 13.0% had someone living alone who was 65 years of age or older. The average household size was 2.91 and the average family size was 3.47.

In the village, the population was spread out, with 37.3% under the age of 18, 6.0% from 18 to 24, 29.1% from 25 to 44, 21.6% from 45 to 64, and 6.0% who were 65 years of age or older. The median age was 29 years. For every 100 females, there were 103.0 males. For every 100 females age 18 and over, there were 100.0 males.

As of 2000 the median income for a household in the village was $29,375, and the median income for a family was $31,750. Males had a median income of $24,000 versus $15,833 for females. The per capita income for the village was $13,288. There were 8.6% of families and 11.9% of the population living below the poverty line, including 17.2% of under eighteens and 14.3% of those over 64.

== See also ==
- List of municipalities in Nebraska
